= Honoré d'Albert de Luynes =

French nobleman

The Duke of Luynes
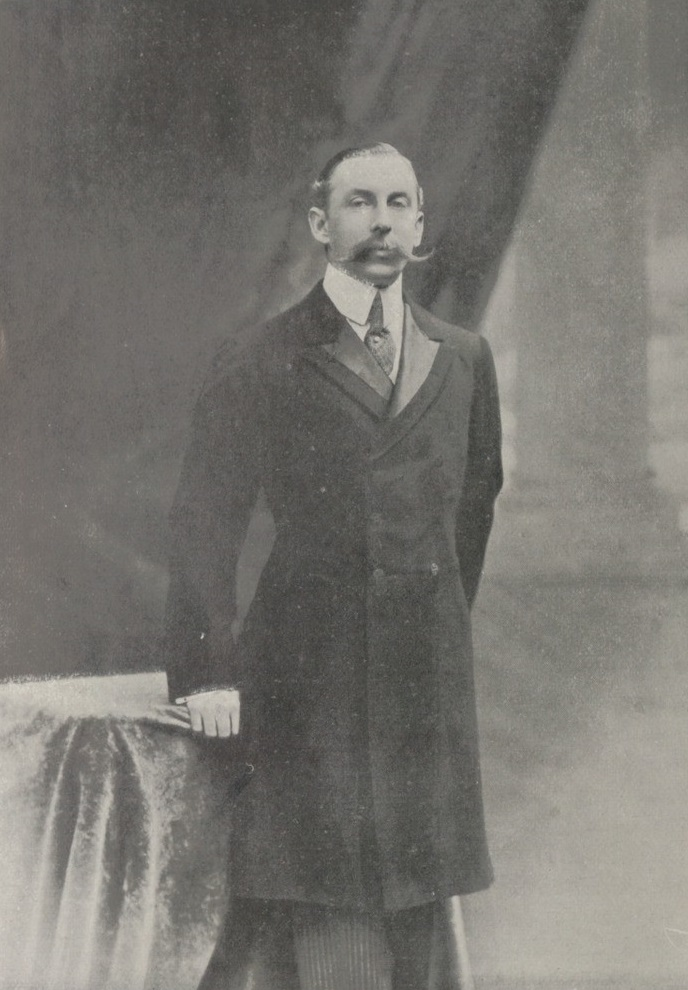
- Photograph of the Duke, by Eugène Pirou, 1905
- Born: Honoré Charles Marie Sosthène d'Albert de Luynes; 30 October 1868; Château de Dampierre in Dampierre-en-Yvelines
- Died: 13 March 1924 (aged 55); Paris, France
- Spouse: Simone Louise Laure de Crussol d'Uzes (m. 1889; died 1924)
- Issue: Emmanuelle, Marquise of Vaulserre; Charles, Duke of Chevreuse; Yolande d'Albert de Luynes; Marie, Duchess of Montebello; Élisabeth du Bourg de Bozas; Philippe d'Albert de Luynes
- Father: Charles Honoré Emmanuel d'Albert de Luynes
- Mother: Yolande Françoise Marie Julienne de La Rochefoucauld

Honoré Charles Marie Sosthène d'Albert de Luynes, 10th Duke of Luynes (30 October 1868 – 13 March 1924) was a French aristocrat and diplomat.

== Early life ==
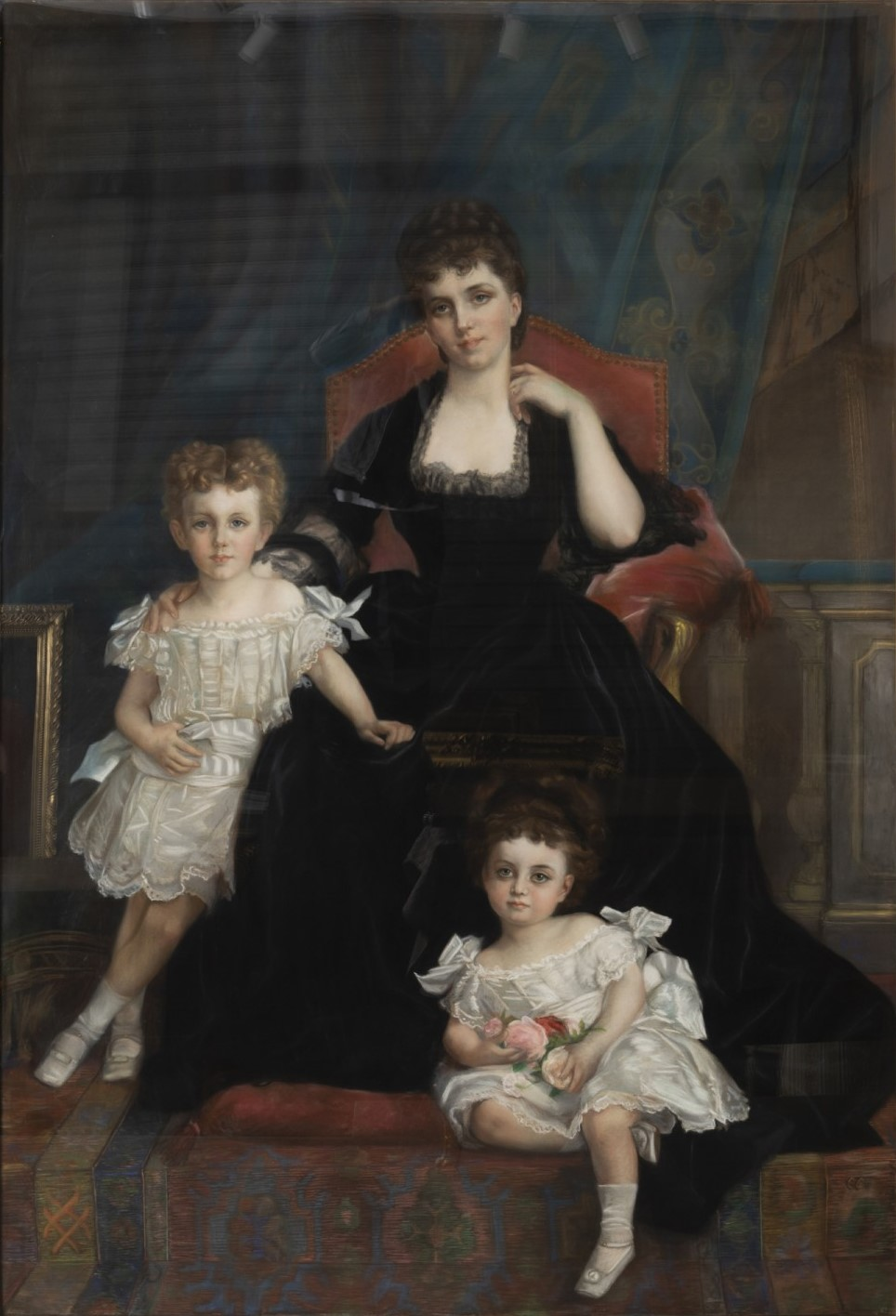
Portrait of the young Duke, his mother, and sister, after Alexandre Cabanel, 1877

Luynes was born on 30 October 1868 at the Château de Dampierre in Dampierre-en-Yvelines in the Île-de-France region in north-central France. He was the only son of Charles Honoré Emmanuel d'Albert de Luynes, 9th Duke of Luynes (1846–1870), and Yolande Françoise Marie Julienne de La Rochefoucauld (1849–1905). His only sibling, Yolande Louise Marie Valentine d'Albert de Luynes, married Adrien de Noailles, 8th Duke of Noailles (a son of Jules Charles Victurnien de Noailles, 7th Duke of Noailles).

His paternal grandparents were Honoré-Louis d'Albert de Luynes, styled Duke of Chevreuse (the heir apparent, until his death, to his father, Honoré Théodoric d'Albert de Luynes, 8th Duke of Luynes), and Valentine-Julie de Contades (a daughter of the French Cavalry officer Jules Gaspard Amour de Contades, Viscount de Contades). His maternal grandparents were Sosthène II de La Rochefoucauld, 4th Duke of Doudeauville, and Princess Yolande de Polignac (a daughter of Prince Jules de Polignac, the 7th Prime Minister of France). Through his sister Yolande, he was uncle to Jean Maurice Paul Jules de Noailles, Duke of Ayen (a member of the French Resistance who died at the Bergen-Belsen concentration camp), and Elisabeth Pauline Sabine Marie de Noailles (a prominent tennis player who competed in the Olympic Games in 1920).

His father, a soldier in the Papal Zouaves, died in Orléans, Loiret during the Battle of Loigny–Poupry on 2 December 1870, at which point the two year-old Honoré succeeded to his father's titles. The Duke studied at the French boarding school, Collège Stanislas de Paris.

== Career ==
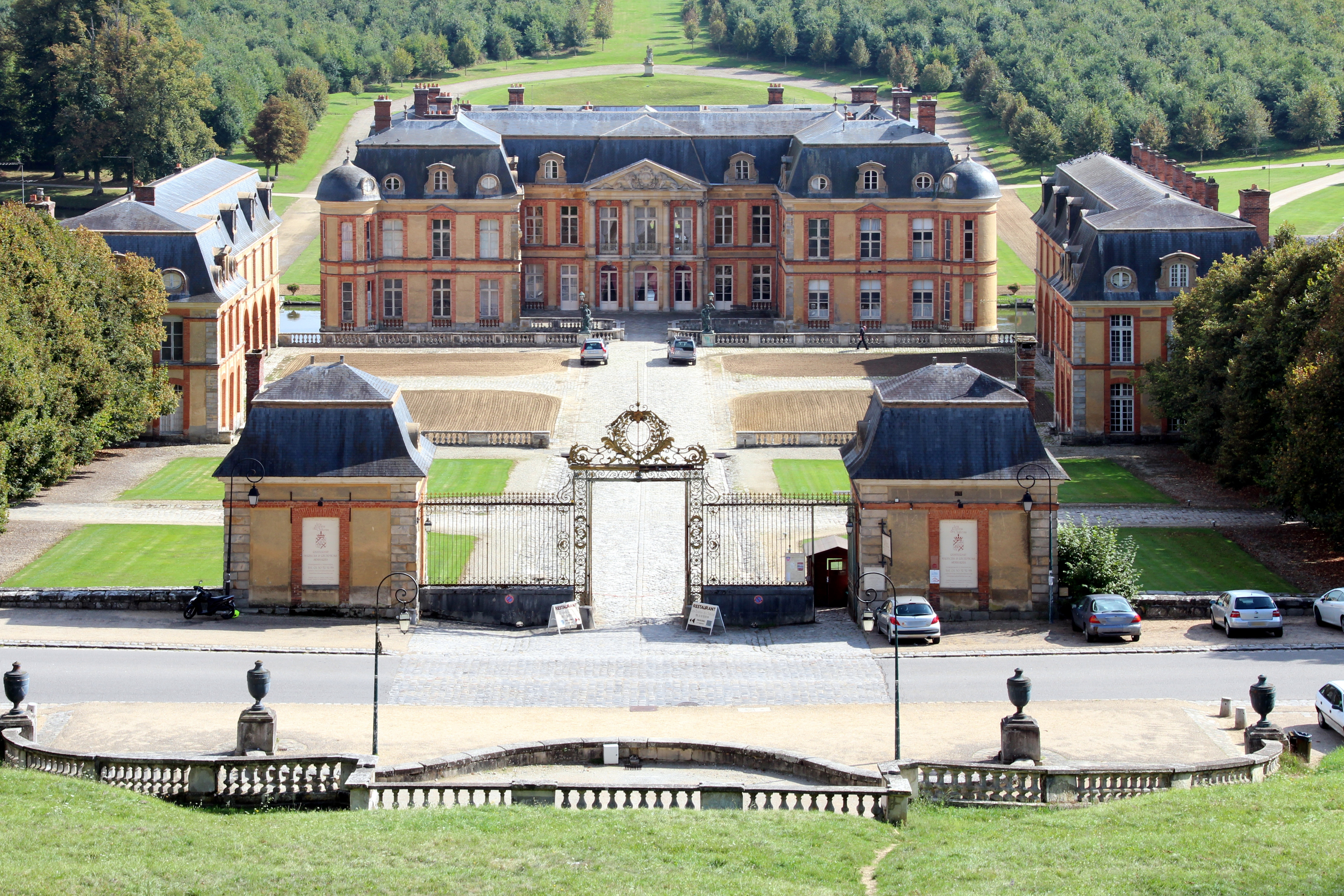
Château de Dampierre in Dampierre-en-Yvelines, 2013.

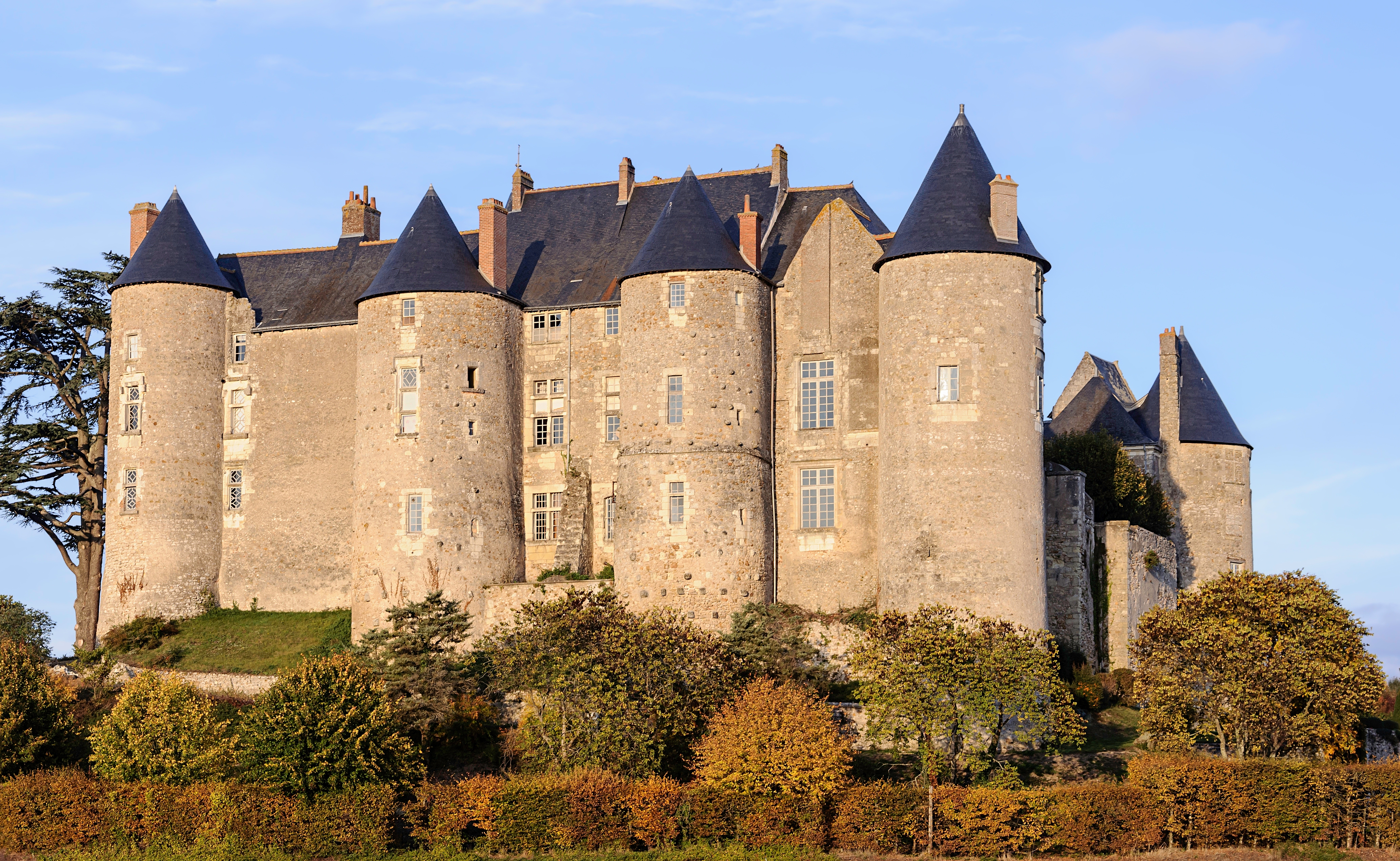
The Château de Luynes, 2011

Before the outbreak of World War I, he was a captain in the Reserve of the 17th Regiment of the Chasseurs à cheval. After War was declared he rejoined his regiment and went to the Front. After Romania joined the Allies, the French War Department sent him to Iași (then known as Jassy in English) to assist King Ferdinand I's Army upon its return from Bucharest. For his work in Romania, he was awarded the Cross of the Legion of Honour by French President Raymond Poincaré.

The Duke was the representative in France of Prince Philippe, Duke of Orléans, pretender to the defunct French throne. In that role, he was the official channel through which the pretender communicated with the government of France and other foreign countries.

== Personal life ==
On 12 December 1889, the Duke married Simone Louise Laure de Crussol d'Uzes (1870–1946), a daughter of Emmanuel de Crussol, 12th Duke of Uzès and Anne de Rochechouart de Mortemart (who inherited a large fortune from her great-grandmother, Madame Clicquot Ponsardin, founder of Veuve Clicquot). Simone's younger brother, Louis Emmanuel de Crussol, married Honoré's first cousin, Marie Thérèse d'Albert de Luynes (a daughter of the 10th Duke of Chaulnes). Together, they were the parents of two sons and four daughters:

- Emmanuelle Anne Yolande Charlotte Simone Valentine Marie Gabrielle d'Albert de Luynes (1891–1947), who married François Michel Marie de Corbel-Corbeau, 7th Marquis of Vaulserre.
- Charles Honoré Jacques Philippe Marie Louis d'Albert de Luynes, styled Duke of Chevreuse (1892–1918), who died during World War I while serving as an aviator.
- Yolande Louise Valentine Marie d'Albert de Luynes (1897–1945)
- Marie Adrienne Mathilde d'Albert de Luynes (1898–1929), who married Napoléon Lannes, 6th Duke of Montebello.
- Élisabeth Philippe Mathilde Marie Gabrielle d'Albert de Luynes (1895–1976), who married Emmanuel du Bourg de Bozas.
- Philippe Anne Louis Marie Dieudonné Jean d'Albert, 11th Duke of Luynes (1905–1993), who married Argentinian heiress Juanita Díaz Unzué, in 1934.

He owned the Château de Dampierre, the Château de Luynes in Indre et Loire, and a residence in Paris at 78 rue de Courcelles. He was a member of the Bois de Boulogne, Jockey-Club de Paris, Cercle de la Rue Royale, and the Yacht Club de France.

The Duke died in the 16th arrondissement of Paris in March 1924, reportedly he "never recovered from the shock of the death of his eldest son". He was succeeded in his titles by his younger son, Philippe.

French nobility
Preceded by Charles Honoré Emmanuel d'Albert de Luynes	Duke of Luynes; 1870–1924	Succeeded by Philippe d'Albert de Luynes
