= Philippe d'Albert, 11th Duke of Luynes =

French aristocrat

Philippe Anne Louis Marie Dieudonné Jean d'Albert, 11th Duke of Luynes (12 August 1905 – 13 July 1993) was a French aristocrat who became the Duke of Luynes at the age of nineteen and held the title until his death in 1993.

== Early life ==
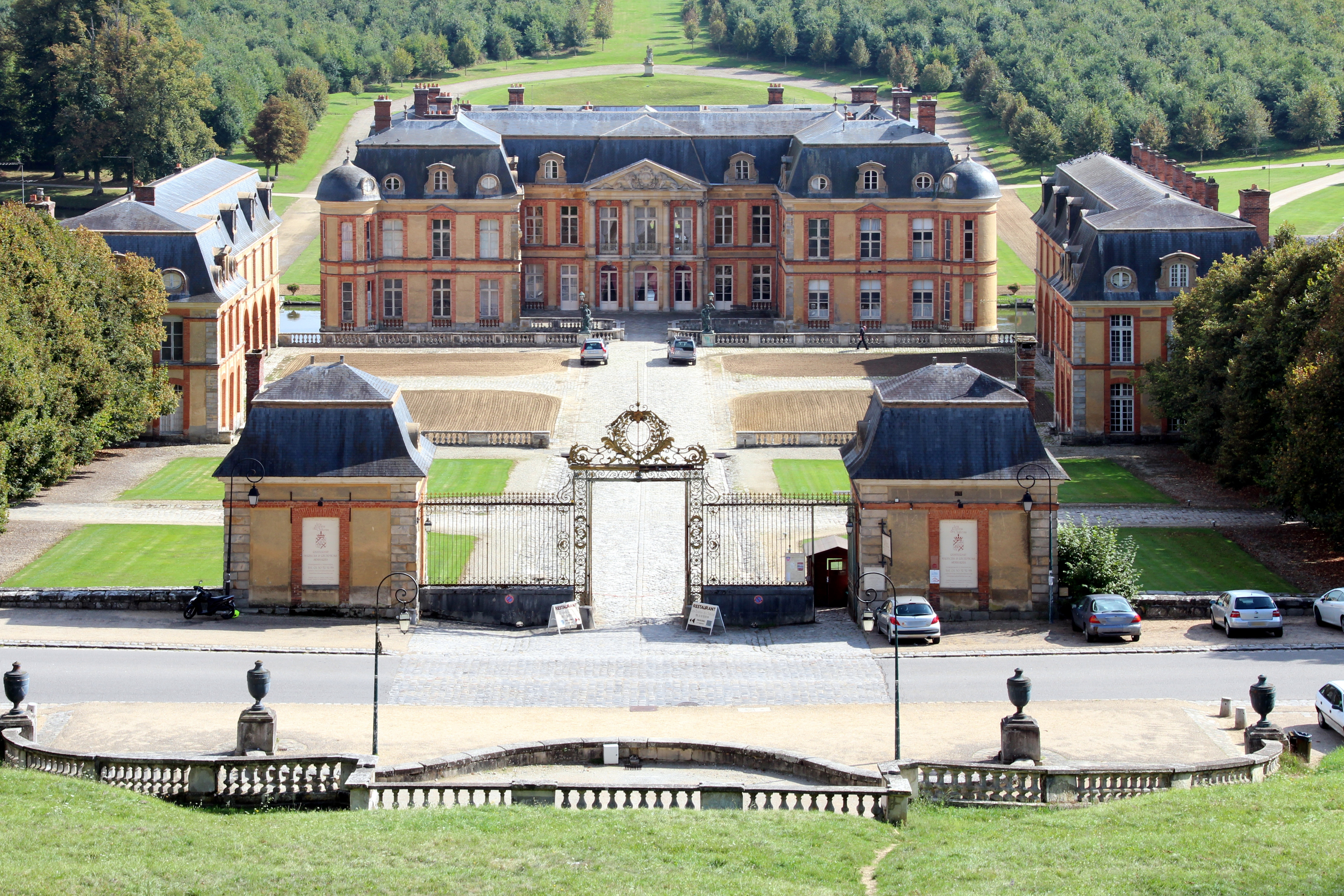
Château de Dampierre in Dampierre-en-Yvelines, 2013.

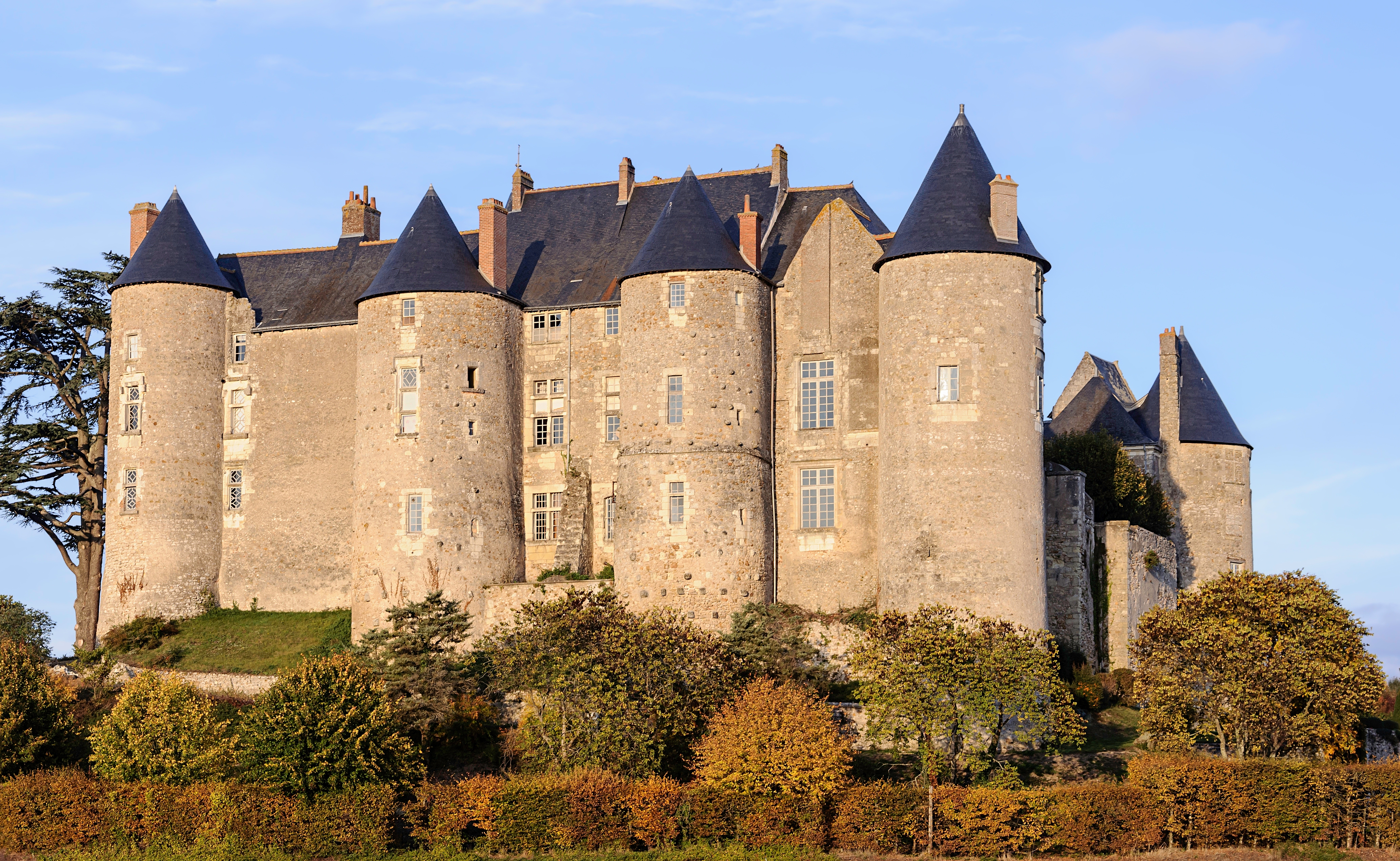
The Château de Luynes, 2011

The Duke of Luynes was born on 12 August 1905 in Dampierre-en-Yvelines in the Île-de-France region in north-central France. He was the second son of six children born to Honoré d'Albert, 10th Duke of Luynes (1868–1924) and Simone Louise Laure de Crussol d'Uzès (1870–1946). His elder brother, Charles-Honoré, used the courtesy title, Duke of Chevreuse, until his death in 1918 during World War I while serving as an aviator.

His paternal grandparents were Charles Honoré Emmanuel d'Albert de Luynes, 9th Duke of Luynes and Yolande de La Rochefoucauld (a daughter of Sosthène II de La Rochefoucauld, 4th Duke of Doudeauville and Princess Yolande, a daughter of Prince Jules de Polignac, the 7th Prime Minister of France). His paternal aunt, Yolande d'Albert de Luynes, married Adrien de Noailles, 8th Duke of Noailles. Their son (and his first cousin), Jean de Noailles, Duke of Ayen, was a member of the French Resistance who was arrested by the Gestapo and died at the Bergen-Belsen concentration camp. His maternal grandparents were Emmanuel de Crussol, 12th Duke of Uzès and Anne de Rochechouart (who inherited a large fortune from her great-grandmother, Madame Clicquot Ponsardin, founder of Veuve Clicquot). Through his aunt Mathilde Renée de Crussol (wife of François de Cossé Brissac, 11th Duke of Brissac), he was a first cousin of Pierre de Cossé Brissac, 12th Duke of Brissac. Two of his uncles, Jacques de Crussol, and Louis de Crussol, succeeded to the dukedom of Uzès. Emmanuel de Crussol d'Uzès (the son of his first cousin Géraud de Crussol d'Uzès), became the 15th Duke of Uzès in 1943.

== Career ==
Upon his father's death in 1924, he became the 11th Duke of Luynes as his elder brother died without male issue. The title had been created for his ancestor, Charles d'Albert, duc de Luynes (brother of Honoré d'Albert, 1st Duke of Chaulnes), by King Louis XIII in 1619.

== Personal life ==
On 5 July 1934, the twenty-nine year old Duke married twenty year old Juanita Díaz Unzué (1914–1993) in a civil ceremony in Paris. A few days later they had a religious ceremony at the Little Church of Dampierre, seat of the ducal family's domains. Juanita was the adopted daughter and heiress of Doña Inès Unzué Dorrego and Don Saturnino Unzué, a wealthy cattle breeder from Buenos Aires, Argentina. They were the main benefactors of Catedral Basílica de Mercedes-Luján in Buenos Aires. Together, they were the parents of:

- Inès Simone Jeanne Marie Therese Charlotte de Luynes Unzué (1939–2013), who married Napoléon, Prince Murat (b. 1925), a son of Alexandre, Prince Murat.
- Charles d'Albert de Luynes (1943–1959), who died young.
- Jean d'Albert de Luynes (1945–2008), the 12th Duke of Luynes.
- Jacques François Marie Raymond d'Albert de Luynes (b. 1946), 13th Duke of Chaulnes.

The Duchess died on 31 May 1993, and the Duke died shortly thereafter on 13 July 1993 at Château de Luynes in Luynes, Indre-et-Loire in France. He was succeeded in his title by his son Jean, who became the 12th Duke of Luynes.
