= Luynes =

Luynes may refer to:

== Places in France ==
- Luynes, Bouches-du-Rhône
- Luynes, Indre-et-Loire

== Other uses ==
- Duke of Luynes, a title belonging to the noble French house d'Albert de Luynes, including a list of people with the surname (d'Albert) de Luynes
- Luynes river, a tributary to the river Arc in the French Provence
