= Charles Honoré d'Albert, 3rd Duke of Luynes =

French nobleman

Charles Honoré d'Albert
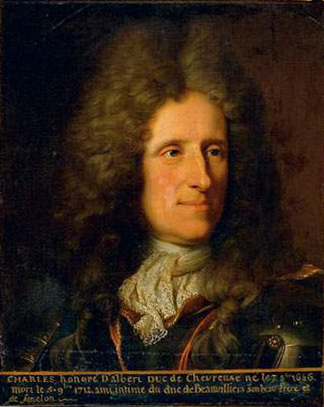
- Portrait of the Duke of Luynes, by Hyacinthe Rigaud, 1707

Governor of the Province of Guienne
- In office 1698–1712

Personal details
- Born: Charles Honoré d'Albert; 7 October 1646
- Died: 5 November 1712 (aged 66) Paris, France
- Spouse: Jeanne Marie Colbert (after 1667)
- Relations: Jeanne Baptiste d'Albert de Luynes (half-sister); Charles Philippe d'Albert de Luynes (grandson); Paul d'Albert de Luynes (grandson); Charles d'Albert, duc de Luynes (grandfather); Marie de Rohan (grandmother)
- Children: Honoré Charles d'Albert de Luynes; Marie Anne d'Albert de Luynes; Louis Auguste d'Albert de Luynes
- Parent(s): Louis Charles d'Albert de Luynes; Louise Marie Séguier, Marquise d'O

Charles Honoré d'Albert de Luynes (French pronunciation: [ʃaʁl ɔnɔʁe dalbɛʁ də lɥin]; 7 October 1646 – 5 November 1712) was a French nobleman and Duke of Luynes. He is best known as the Duke of Chevreuse, his family's subsidiary title which he used until his father's death in 1690. He was a high-ranking French official under King Louis XIV.

== Early life ==
He was the eldest son of Louis Charles d'Albert de Luynes (1620–1699), 2nd Duke of Luynes and Louise Marie Séguier, Marquise d'O (1629–1651). After his mother's death, his father remarried to Princess Anne de Rohan-Montbazon (1640–1684), with whom he had five more children, including his half-sister Jeanne Baptiste d'Albert de Luynes, the mistress of Victor Amadeus II of Sardinia. After her death in 1684, his father married, thirdly, to Marguerite d'Aligre in 1685.

The Duke of Chevreuse was the grandson of the French courtier and favourite of Louis XIII, Charles d'Albert, duc de Luynes, and the former Marie de Rohan, the infamous duchesse de Chevreuse and one of the leading members of the Fronde.

== Career ==
The duc de Chevreuse was a private advisor of Louis XIV, and a sort of unofficial minister without portfolio. From 1698 until 1712 he was the non-residing governor of the province of Guienne (from the time of Louis XIV onwards the governorship of French provinces was essentially an honorific title and governors were not allowed to reside or even visit their provinces).

Friend of the Duke of Beauvilliers and of the famous archbishop François Fénelon, he maintained a steady exchange of correspondence with the latter. It is at the Duke of Chevreuse's estate in Chaulnes (Somme department) that Fénelon wrote his Tables de Chaulnes (1711).

Along with his friends, Chevreuse was a reformist in the circle of the Duke of Burgundy, petit dauphin, grandson of Louis XIV and heir to the throne, advocating a less centralised and absolute monarchy relying more on the aristocracy. His ideas were briefly applied after 1715 (see polysynody), although he did not live long enough to see it.

== Personal life ==
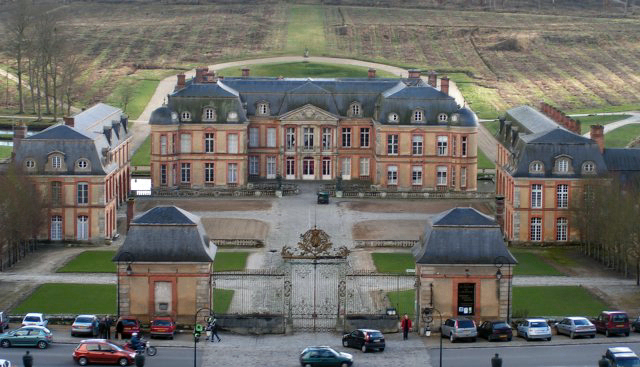
Château de Dampierre in Dampierre-en-Yvelines: domesticated Baroque built for the duc de Chevreuse by Jules Hardouin Mansart.

On 3 February 1667, he was married to Jeanne Marie Colbert (1650–1732) in Paris. She was the daughter of French statesman Jean-Baptiste Colbert, who served as First Minister of State from 1661 until 1683 under the rule of King Louis XIV. Among her siblings were brothers Jean-Baptiste Colbert, Marquis de Seignelay and Jacques-Nicolas Colbert, the Archbishop of Rouen. Together, they were the parents of ten children:

- Charles Jean Baptiste d'Albert de Luynes (1667–1672), who died young.
- Marie Thérèse d'Albert de Luynes (1668–1670), who died young.
- Honoré Charles d'Albert de Luynes (1669–1704), who was styled the Duke of Montfort then the Duke of Chevreuse; he married Marie Anne Jeanne de Courcillon, daughter of Philippe de Courcillon, the French officer and diarist.
- Marie Anne d'Albert de Luynes (1671–1694), who married Charles François de Montmorency-Luxembourg, a son of François Henri de Montmorency, Duke of Luxembourg, no issue.
- Marie Thérèse d'Albert de Chevreuse Luynes (b. 1673) who married Michel Adalbert de Morstein, Count of Morestein and Châteauvillain, in 1693. After his death, she married Ismidon René de Sassenage in 1698.
- Louis Auguste d'Albert de Luynes (1676–1744), who married Marie Anne Romaine de Beaumanoir and had issue. The Duke of Luynes assigned the duchy of Chaulnes to Louis Auguste, Vidame d'Amiens, on the occasion of his marriage in 1710. This transmission was confirmed by letters patent in October 1711 and registered on 1 December 1711.
- Paul d'Albert de Luynes (b. 1675)
- N. d'Albert de Luynes (b. 1677)
- Marie Françoise d'Albert de Luynes (b. 1678), who married Charles Eugène de Lévis in 1698.

He died in Paris on 5 November 1712.

=== Descendants ===
Through his eldest surviving son, he was a grandfather of Charles Philippe d'Albert de Luynes (1695–1758), 4th duc de Luynes as well as the astronomer Paul d'Albert de Luynes (1703–1788), Cardinal and Archbishop of Sens.

Through his youngest son, he was a grandfather of the astronomer, physicist and freemason Michel Ferdinand d'Albert (1714–1769), Duke of Picquigny and then Duke of Chaulnes from 1744.

== See also ==
- Duke of Luynes
- Duke of Chevreuse

== Ancestry ==
Ancestors of Charles Honoré d'Albert, 3rd Duke of Luynes

16. Léon d'Albert
8. Honoré d'Albert
17. Jeanne de Ségur, Dame of Luynes
4. Charles d'Albert de Luynes
9. Anne de Rodulf
2. Louis Charles d'Albert de Luynes
20. Louis de Rohan, Prince of Guéméné
10. Hercule de Rohan, Duke of Montbazon
21. Eléanore de Rohan
5. Marie de Rohan
11. Madeleine de Lenoncourt
1. Charles Honoré d'Albert de Luynes
6. Pierre III Seguier
3. Louise Marie Seguier, Marquise d'O
7. Marguerite de La Guesle
