= Mansard roof =

Four-sided gambrel-style hip roof

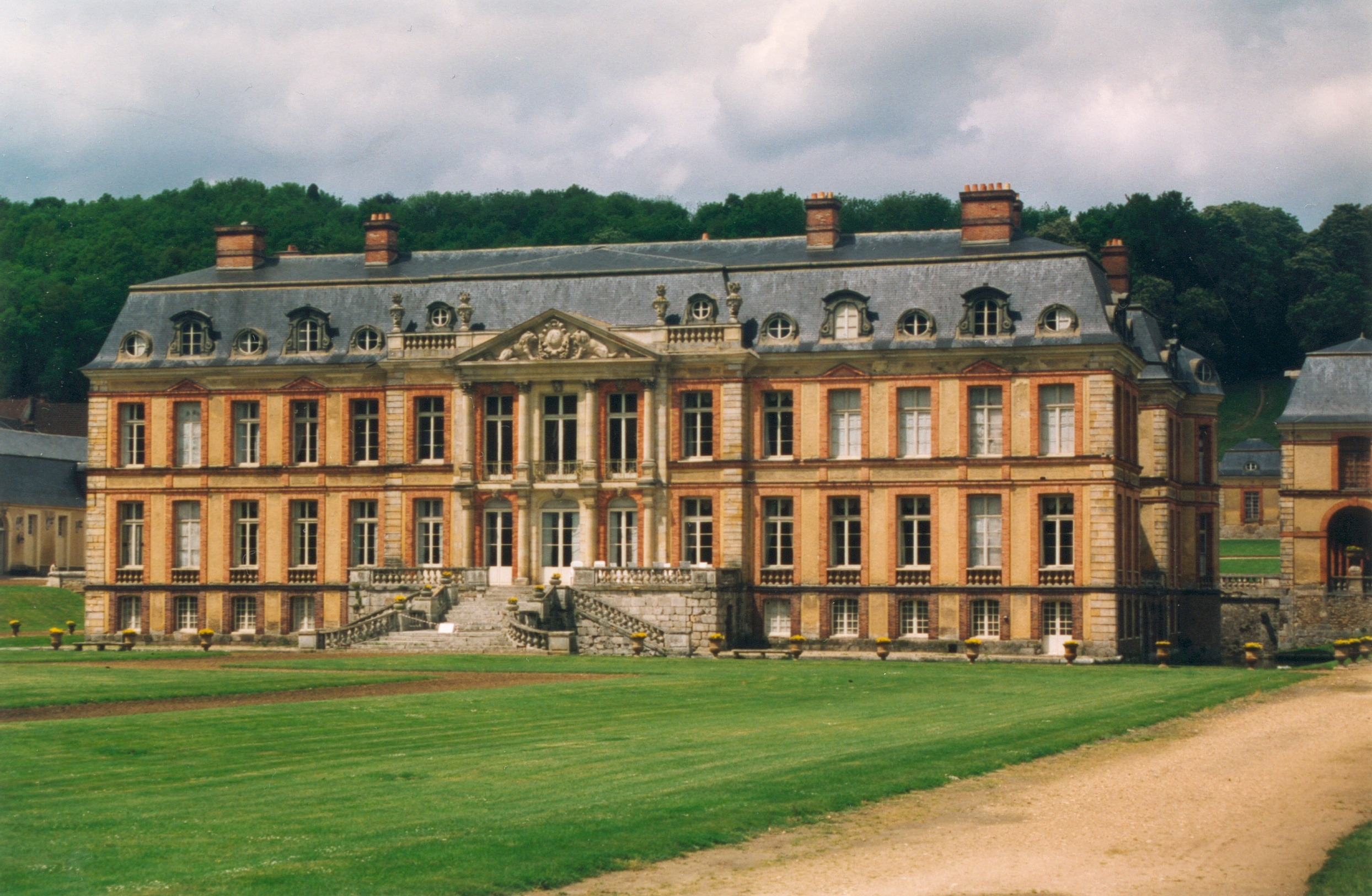
A mansard roof on the Château de Dampierre, by Jules Hardouin-Mansart, great-nephew of François Mansart

A mansard or mansard roof (also called French roof or curb roof) is a multi-sided gambrel-style hip roof characterised by two slopes on each of its sides, with the lower slope at a steeper angle than the upper, and often punctured by dormer windows. The steep roofline and windows allow for additional floors of habitable space (a garret), and reduce the overall height of the roof for a given number of habitable storeys. The upper slope of the roof may not be visible from street level when viewed from close proximity to the building.

The earliest known example of a mansard roof is credited to Pierre Lescot on part of the Louvre built around 1550. This roof design was popularised in the early 17th century by François Mansart (1598–1666), an accomplished architect of the French Baroque period. It became especially fashionable during the Second French Empire (1852–1870) of Napoléon III. Mansard in Europe (France, Germany and elsewhere) also means the attic or garret space itself, not just the roof shape and is often used in Europe to mean a gambrel roof.

== Identification ==
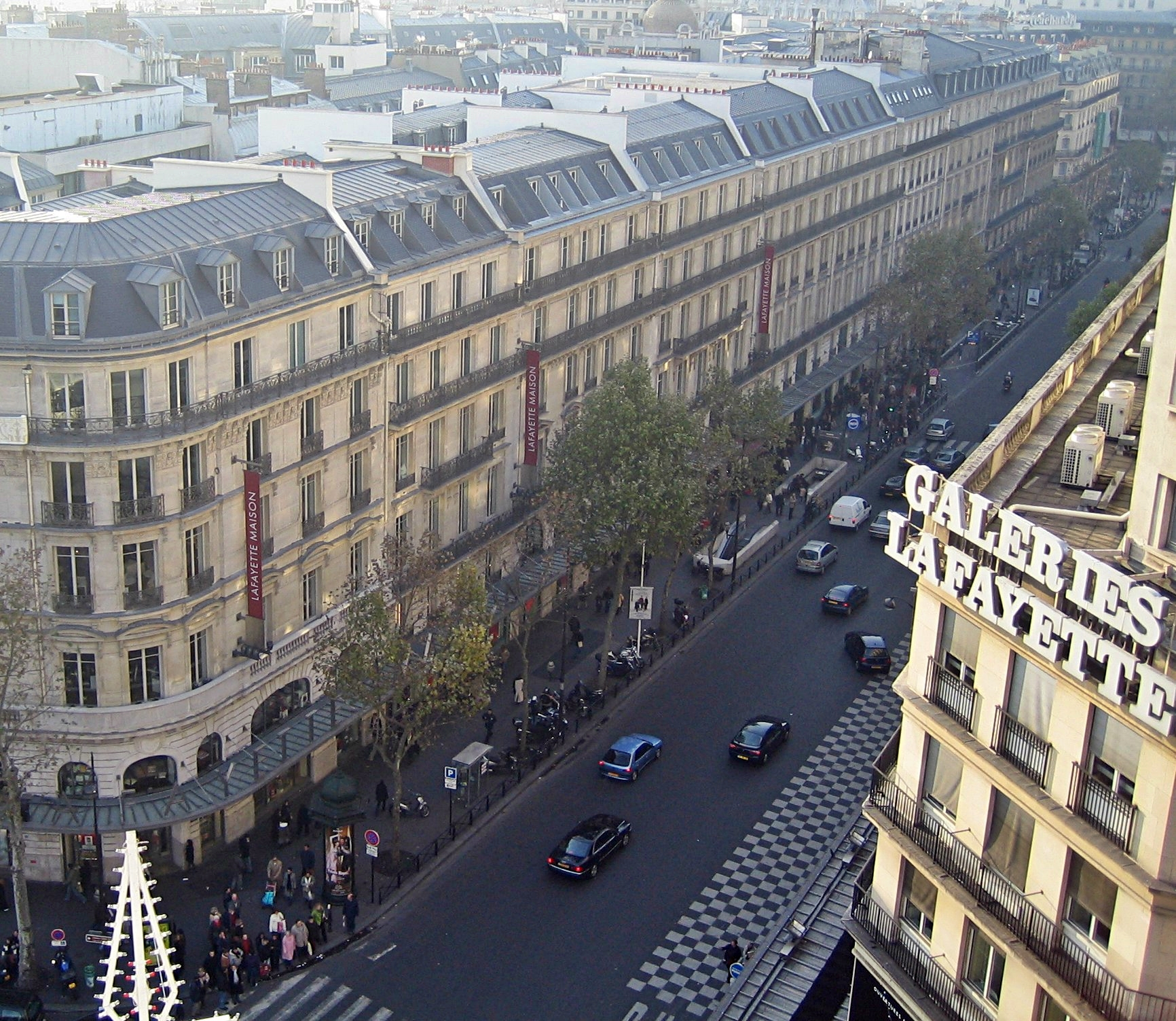
Mansard rooftops along Boulevard Haussmann in Paris constructed during the Second French Empire.

Two distinct traits of the mansard roof – steep sides and a double pitch – sometimes lead to it being confused with other roof types. Since the upper slope of a mansard roof is rarely visible from the ground, a conventional single-plane roof with steep sides may be misidentified as a mansard roof. The gambrel roof style, commonly seen in barns in North America, is a close cousin of the mansard. Both mansard and gambrel roofs fall under the general classification of "curb roofs" (a pitched roof that slopes away from the ridge in two successive planes).

The mansard is a curb hip roof, with slopes on all sides of the building, and the gambrel is a curb gable roof, with slopes on only two sides. The curb is a horizontal, heavy timber directly under the intersection of the two roof surfaces. A significant difference between the two, for snow loading and water drainage, is that, when seen from above, gambrel roofs culminate in a long crease at the main ridge beam, whereas mansard roofs form a rectangular shaped crease, outlined by the curb beams, with a low-pitched roof inside this rectangle.

French roof is often used as a synonym for a mansard but is also defined as an American variation of a mansard with the lower pitches nearly vertical and larger in proportion to the upper pitches.

In France and Germany, no distinction is made between gambrels and mansards – they are both called "mansards". In the French language, mansarde can be a term for the style of roof, or for the garret living space, or attic, directly within it.

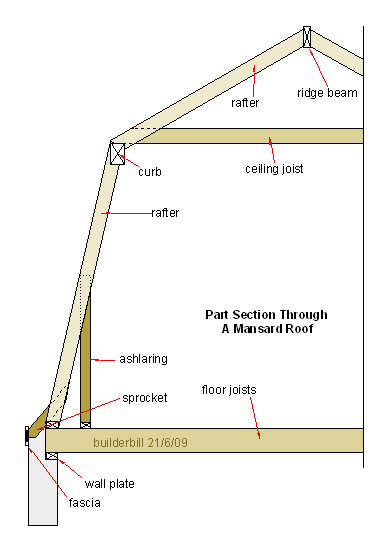
A cross-sectional diagram of a timber-framed Mansard roof; each of its four faces has the same profile.

== Advantages ==
The mansard style makes maximum use of the interior space of the attic and offers a simple way to add one or more storeys to an existing (or new) building without necessarily requiring any masonry. Often the decorative potential of the mansard is exploited through the use of convex or concave curvature and with elaborate dormer window surrounds.

One frequently seen explanation for the popularity of the mansard style is that it served as a method of tax avoidance. One such example of this claim, from the 1914 book How to Make a Country Place, reads, "Monsieur Mansard is said to have circumvented that senseless window tax of France by adapting the windowed roof that bears his name." This is improbable in many respects: Mansart was a profligate spender of his clients' money, and while a French window tax did exist, it was enacted in 1798, 132 years after Mansart's death, and did not exempt mansard windows.

Later examples suggest that either French or American buildings were taxed by their height (or number of storeys) to the base of the roof, or that mansards were used to bypass zoning restrictions. This last explanation is the nearest to the truth: a Parisian law had been in place since 1783, restricting the heights of buildings to 20 metres (65 feet). The height was only measured up to the cornice line, making any living space contained in a mansard roof exempt. A 1902 revision of the law permitted building three or even four storeys within such a roof.

In London in the 1930s, building regulations decreed that "a building (not being a church or a chapel) shall not be erected of, or be subsequently increased to, a greater height than 80 ft., exclusive of two storeys in the roof, and of ornamental towers". This was to stop buildings blocking the light, and effectively mandated mansard roofs for tall buildings.

In the Soviet Union, the mansard roof served as a useful way of expanding a dacha; until 1981, Soviet building codes required that a dacha must have only a single story of a limited size, but the space inside of a mansard roof was ignored as it was considered an attic, thus enabling dacha owners to nearly double the available space and enjoy the advantages of a two-storey home. As a result, dachas built during the Soviet era typically have mansard roofs.

== History and use ==
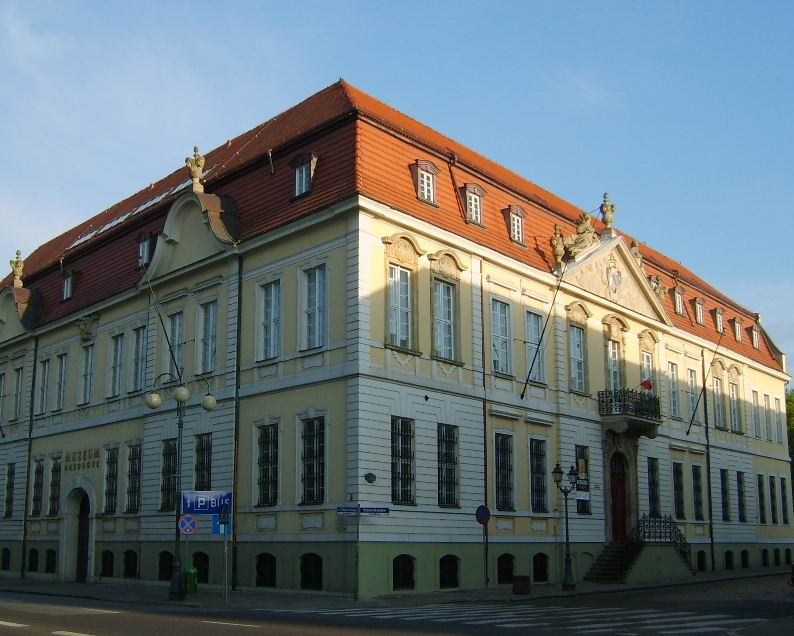
The Landed Gentry House in Szczecin, Poland

=== Early use ===
The style was popularised in France by architect François Mansart (1598–1666). Although he was not the inventor of the style, his extensive and prominent use of it in his designs gave rise to the term "mansard roof", an adulteration of his name. The design tradition was continued by numerous architects, including Jules Hardouin-Mansart (1646–1708), his great-nephew, who is responsible for Château de Dampierre in Dampierre-en-Yvelines.

=== Second Empire ===
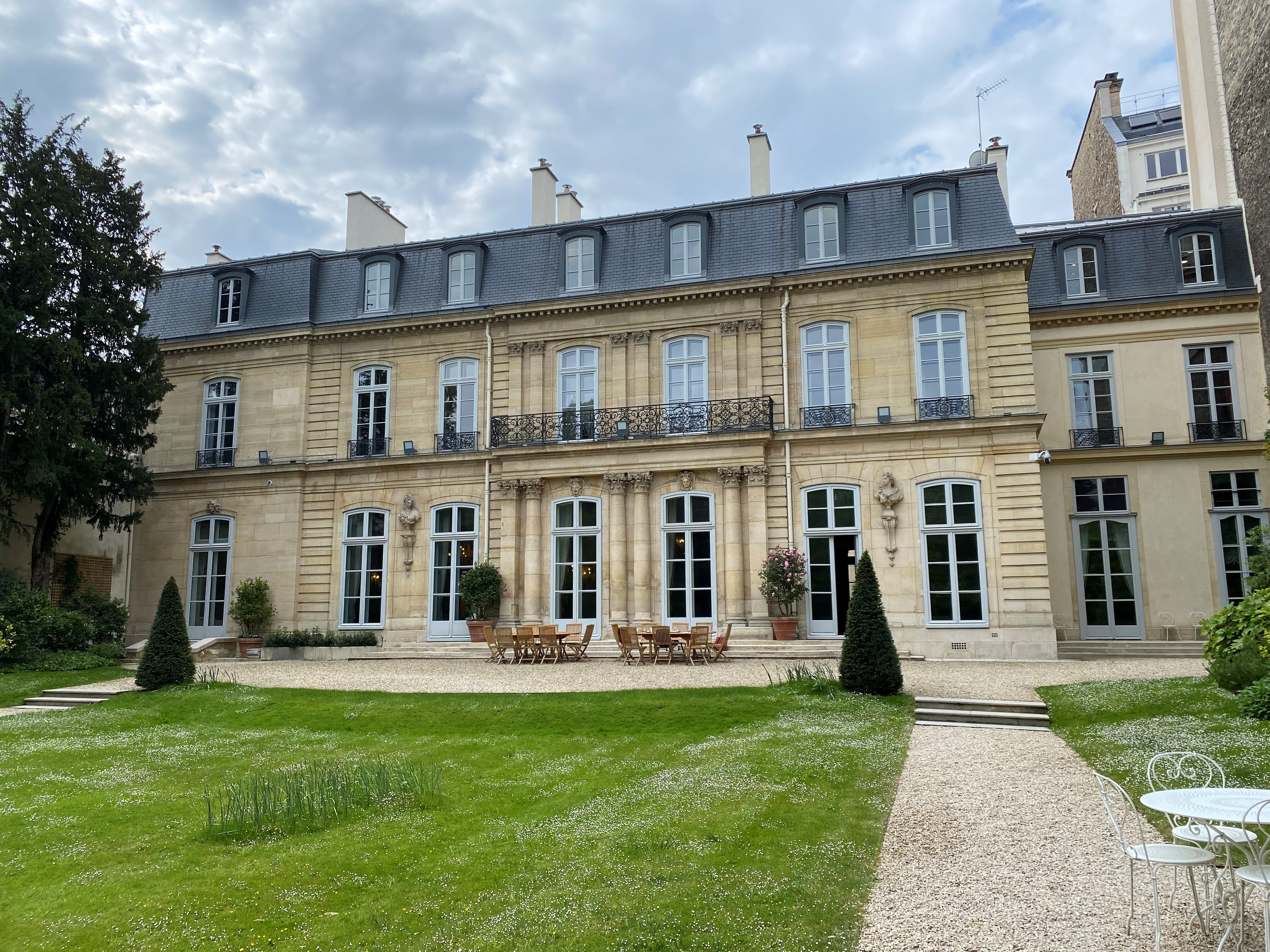
The Hôtel de Besenval in Paris. The mansard roof was added in 1866.

The mansard roof became popular once again during Haussmann's renovation of Paris beginning in the 1850s, in an architectural movement known as Second Empire style.

Second Empire influence spread throughout the world, frequently adopted for large civic structures such as government administration buildings and city halls, as well as hotels and railway stations. In the United States and Canada, and especially in New England, the Second Empire influence spread to family residences and mansions, often incorporated with Italianate and Gothic Revival elements. A mansard-topped tower became a popular element incorporated into many designs, such as Main Building (Vassar College), Poughkeepsie, New York, which shows a large mansard-roofed structure with two towers.

=== 20th century ===
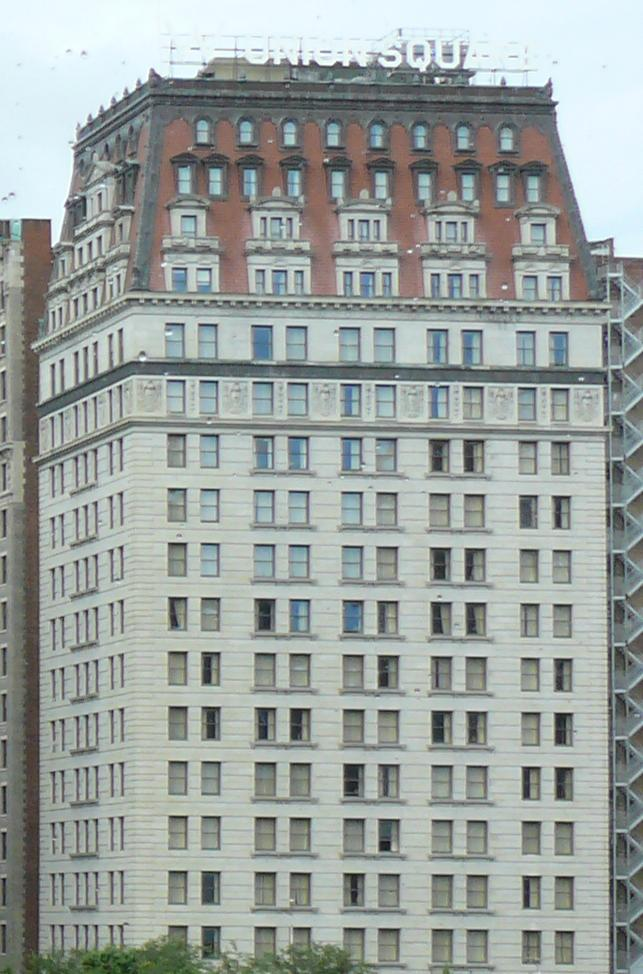
The Germania Life Insurance Company Building in New York City, built in 1911, with a four-story mansard roof

The 1916 Zoning Resolution adopted by New York City promoted the use of mansard roofs; rules requiring the use of setbacks on tall buildings were conducive to the mansard design.

In the 1960s and 1970s, a modernised form of mansard roof, sometimes with deep, narrow windows, became popular for both residential and commercial architecture in many areas of the United States. In many cases, these are not true mansard roofs but flat on top, the sloped façade providing a way to conceal heating, ventilation and air-conditioning equipment from view. The style grew out of interest in postmodern stylistic elements and the "French eclectic" house style popular in the 1930s and 1940s, and in housing also offered a way to provide an upper storey despite height restrictions. Houses with mansard roofs were sometimes described as French Provincial; architect John Elgin Woolf popularised it in the Los Angeles area, calling his houses Hollywood Regency.

== Transportation ==
The roof of two Victorian Railways hopper wagons resembled a mansard roof. The Australian Commonwealth Railways CL class locomotive also has a mansard roof.

== See also ==
- List of roof shapes
