= Charles Honoré Emmanuel d'Albert de Luynes =

French aristocrat and soldier

The Duke of Luynes and Chevreuse
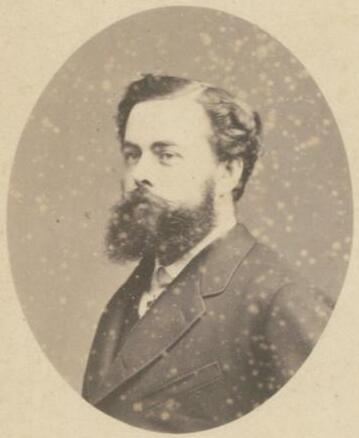
- Born: Charles Honoré Emmanuel d'Albert de Luynes; 22 June 1846
- Died: 2 December 1870 (aged 24); Orléans, Loiret
- Spouse: Yolande de La Rochefoucauld (m. 1867; died 1870)
- Children: Honoré d'Albert de Luynes; Yolande, Duchess de Noailles
- Parent(s): Honoré-Louis d'Albert de Luynes; Valentine-Julie de Contades
- Relatives: Paul Marie Stanislas Honoré d'Albert de Luynes (brother); Philippe d'Albert de Luynes (grandson); Jean Maurice Paul Jules de Noailles (grandson); Élisabeth d'Ayen (granddaughter)

Charles Honoré Emmanuel d'Albert de Luynes, 9th Duke of Luynes (22 June 1846 – 2 December 1870) was a French aristocrat and soldier in the Papal Zouaves.

== Early life ==
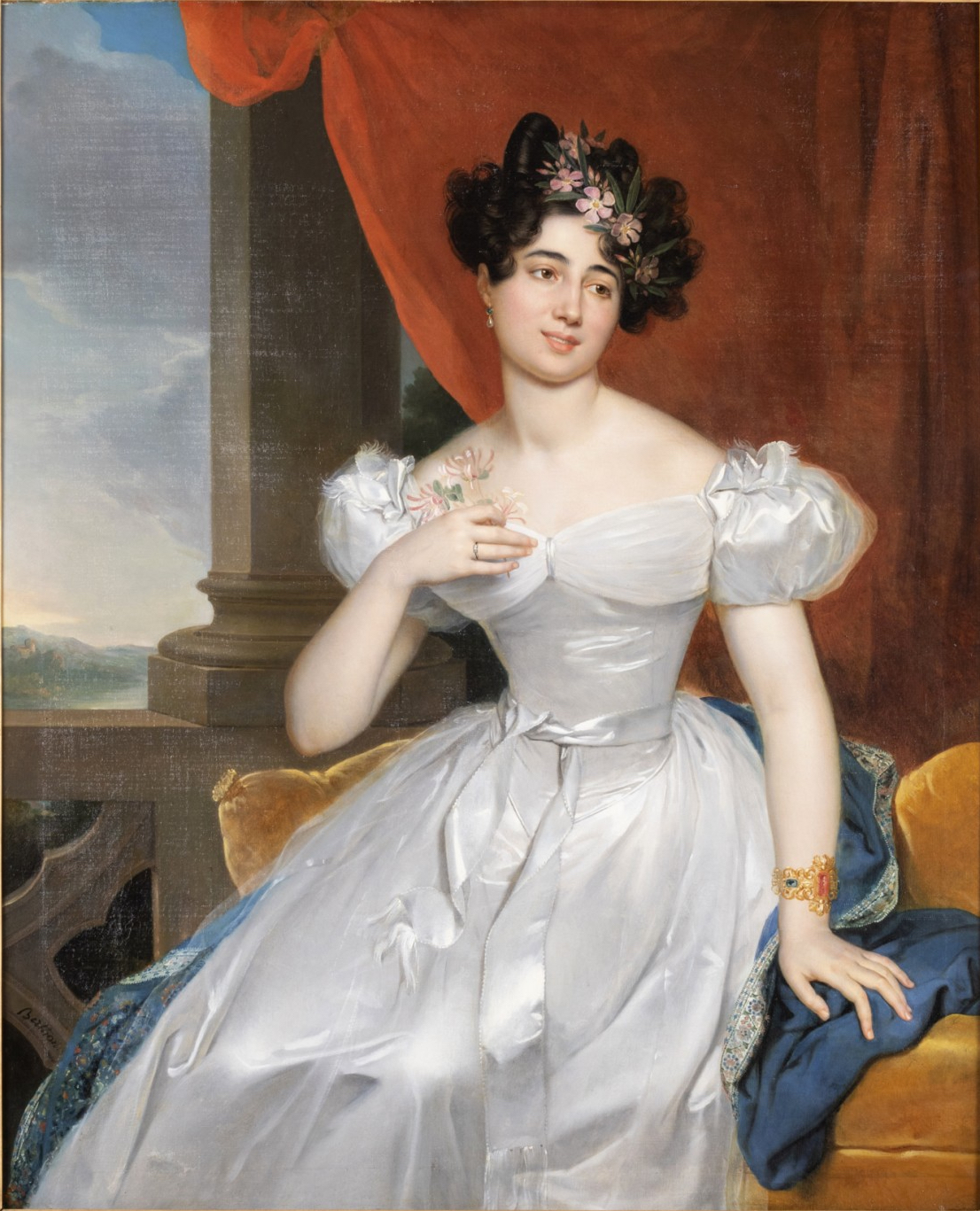
Portrait of his mother, Valentine de Contades, by René Théodore Berthon

Charles Honoré Emmanuel was born on 22 June 1846. He was the eldest son of Honoré-Louis d'Albert de Luynes, Duke of Chevreuse (1823–1854), and Valentine-Julie de Contades (1824–1900). His sister was Marie Julie d'Albert de Luynes (wife of Elzéar Charles Antoine de Sabran-Pontevès, 3rd Duke of Sabran) and his younger brother was Paul Marie Stanislas Honoré d'Albert de Luynes, 10th Duke of Chaulnes and Picquigny (who married Princess Sophie Golitsyn, a granddaughter of Prince Pyotr Alexeyevich Golitsyn).

His father was the only child of Marie Françoise Dauvet de Maineville and Honoré Théodoric d'Albert de Luynes, 8th Duke of Luynes, a prominent writer on archaeology who is most remembered for the collection of exhibits he gave to the Cabinet des Médailles, and for supporting the exiled Comte de Chambord's claim to the throne of France. His maternal grandparents were French cavalry officer Jules Gaspard Amour de Contades, Viscount de Contades (son of François-Jules de Contades) and Gabrielle Adèle Alexandrine Amys du Ponceau.

== Career ==
As his father predeceased his grandfather, he succeeded to the dukedom of Luynes and Chevreuse in 1867 while the dukedom of Chaulnes passed to his younger brother Paul. The dukedom of Luynes had been created for his ancestor, Charles d'Albert, duc de Luynes (brother of Honoré d'Albert, 1st Duke of Chaulnes), by King Louis XIII in 1619. He only held the title for three years before his death in 1870 upon which his eldest son, who was only two years old, succeeded to the dukedom.

The Duke was a member of the Papal Zouaves, (Note: The Papal Zouaves was an infantry battalion, later regiment, dedicated to defending the Papal States. Named after the French zouave regiments, the Zuavi Pontifici were mainly Catholic young men who volunteered to assist Pope Pius IX in his struggle against the Italian unificationist Risorgimento.) and was killed in the Battle of Loigny–Poupry on 2 December 1870.

== Personal life ==
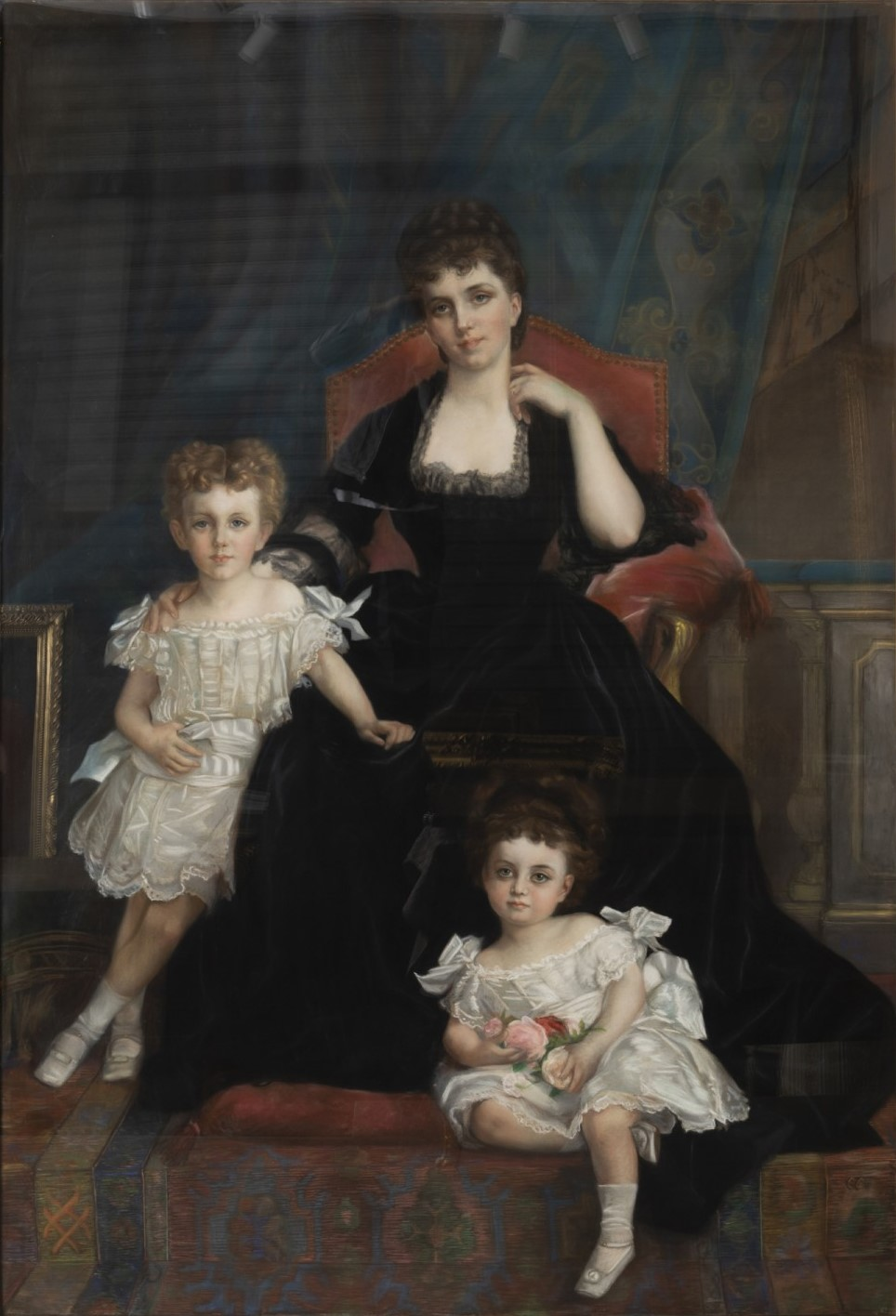
Portrait of his widow, Yolande de La Rochefoucauld and their children

On 5 December 1867, he married Yolande Françoise Marie Julienne de La Rochefoucauld (1849–1905) in Paris. She was a daughter of Sosthène II de La Rochefoucauld, 4th Duke of Doudeauville, and Princess Yolande de Polignac (a daughter of Prince Jules de Polignac, the 7th Prime Minister of France). Through her great-grandmother, Pauline Hortense (née d'Albert de Luynes), Duchess of Montmorency-Laval, she was also a descendant of Louis Joseph d'Albert, 6th Duke of Luynes. Together, they were the parents of:

- Honoré Charles Marie Sosthène d'Albert de Luynes, 10th Duke of Luynes (1868–1924), who married Simone Louise Laure de Crussol d'Uzes, a daughter of Emmanuel de Crussol, 12th Duke of Uzès and Anne de Rochechouart de Mortemart (who inherited a large fortune from her great-grandmother, Madame Clicquot Ponsardin, founder of Veuve Clicquot). Simone's younger brother, Louis Emmanuel de Crussol, married Honoré's first cousin, Marie Thérèse d'Albert de Luynes (a daughter of the 10th Duke of Chaulnes).
- Yolande Louise Marie Valentine d'Albert de Luynes (1870–1952), who married Adrien de Noailles, 8th Duke of Noailles, a son of Jules Charles Victurnien de Noailles, 7th Duke of Noailles.

The Duke died in Orléans, Loiret during the Battle of Loigny–Poupry on 2 December 1870, only 24 years old. He was succeeded in his titles by his only son, Honoré, then only two years old.

=== Descendants ===
Through his only son, he was posthumously a grandfather of Emmanuelle Anne Yolande Charlotte Simone Valentine Marie Gabrielle d'Albert de Luynes (1891–1947), wife of the Marquis de Vaulserre, Charles Honoré Jacques Philippe Marie Louis d'Albert de Luynes, styled Duke of Chevreuse (1892–1918), who died during World War I while serving as an aviator, Yolande Louise Valentine Marie d'Albert de Luynes (1897–1945), Marie Adrienne Mathilde d'Albert de Luynes (1898–1929), wife of the 6th Duke of Montebello, and Élisabeth Philippe Mathilde Marie Gabrielle d'Albert de Luynes (1895–1976), wife of Emmanuel du Bourg de Bozas, and Philippe d'Albert de Luynes, 11th Duke of Luynes (1905–1993).

Through his daughter Yolande, he was posthumously a grandfather of Jean Maurice Paul Jules de Noailles, duc d'Ayen (1893–1945), a member of the French Resistance who died at the Bergen-Belsen concentration camp, Yolande Marie Clothilde Charlotte de Noailles (1896–1976), and Elisabeth Pauline Sabine Marie de Noailles (1898–1969), a prominent tennis player who competed in the Olympic Games in 1920.

French nobility
Preceded by Honoré Théodoric d'Albert de Luynes	Duke of Luynes; 1867–1870	Succeeded by Honoré d'Albert de Luynes
Preceded by Honoré-Louis d'Albert de Luynes	Duke of Chevreuse; 1854–1870	Succeeded by Honoré d'Albert de Luynes
