= Duke of Luynes =

French noble title

The Duke of Luynes (French: duc de Luynes French: [dyk də lɥin]) is a territorial name belonging to the noble French house d'Albert. Luynes is, today, a commune of the Indre-et-Loire département in France. The family of Albert, which sprang from Thomas Alberti (died 1455), seigneur de Boussargues, bailli of Viviers and Valence, and viguier of Bagnols and Pont-Saint-Esprit in Languedoc, acquired the estate of Luynes in the 16th century.

== History ==
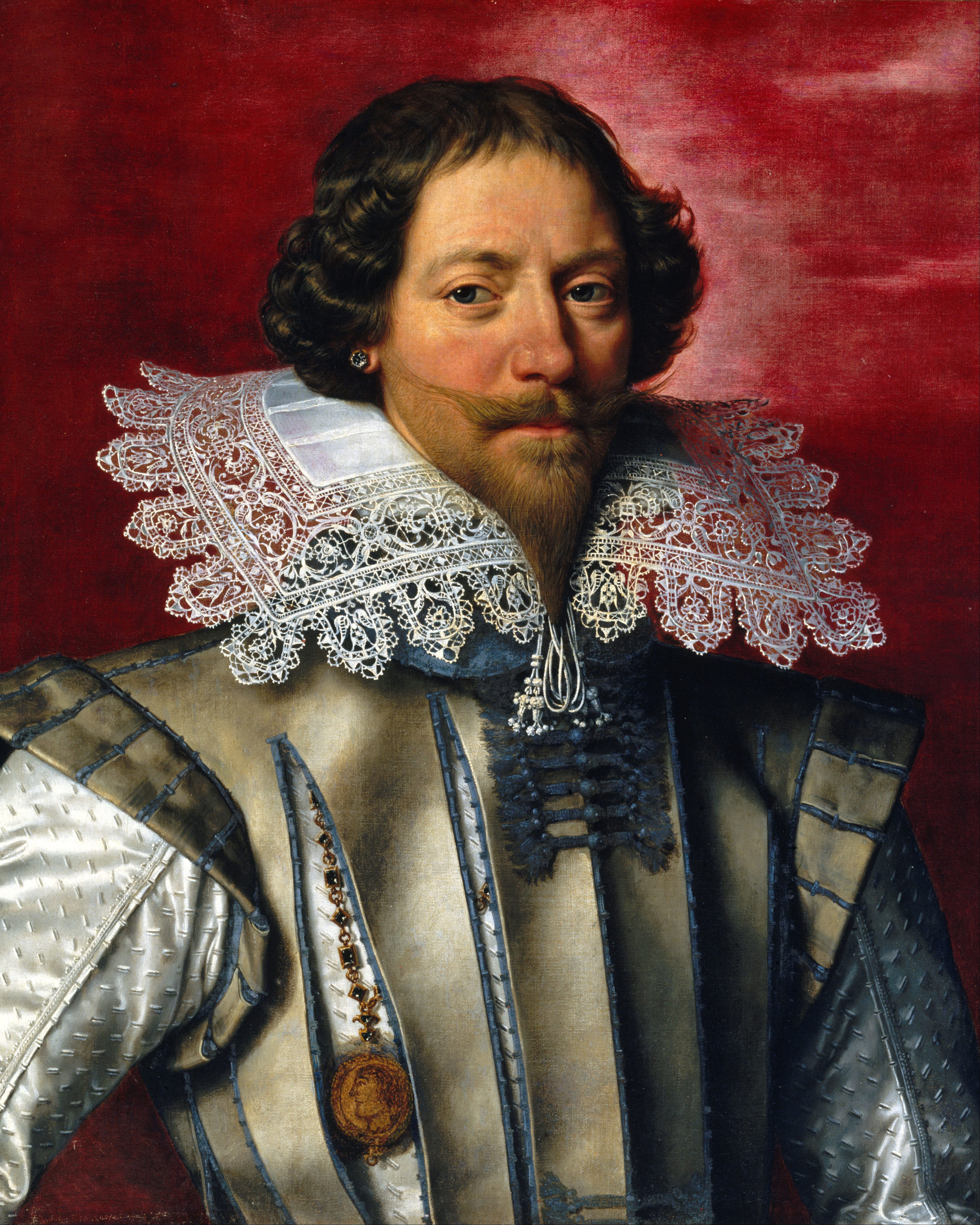
Portrait of the 1st Duke of Luynes, by Frans Pourbus the Younger

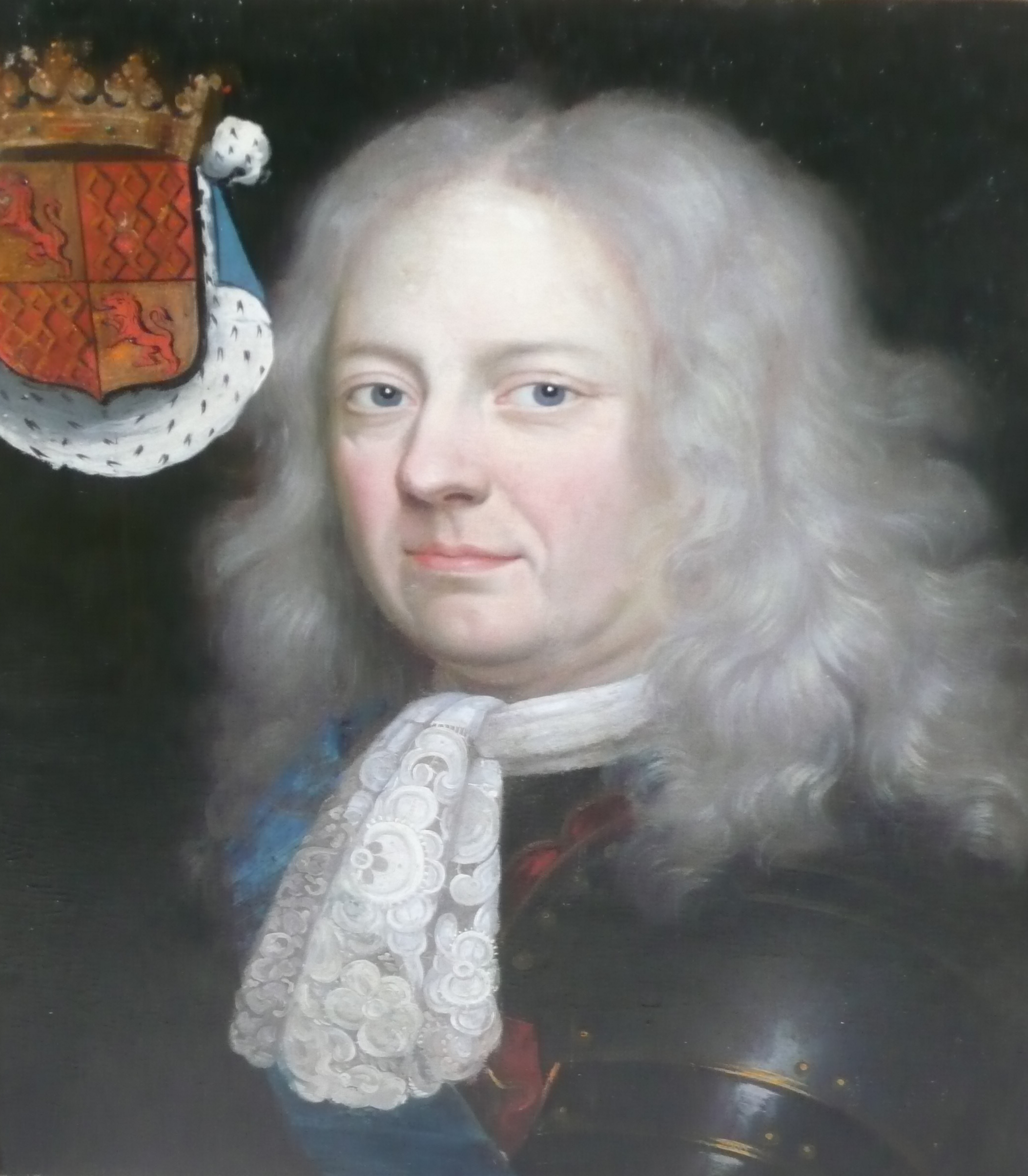
Portrait of Louis Charles d'Albert, 2nd Duke of Luynes

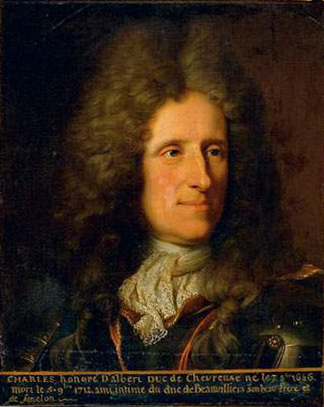
Portrait of the 3rd Duke of Luynes, by Hyacinthe Rigaud, 1707

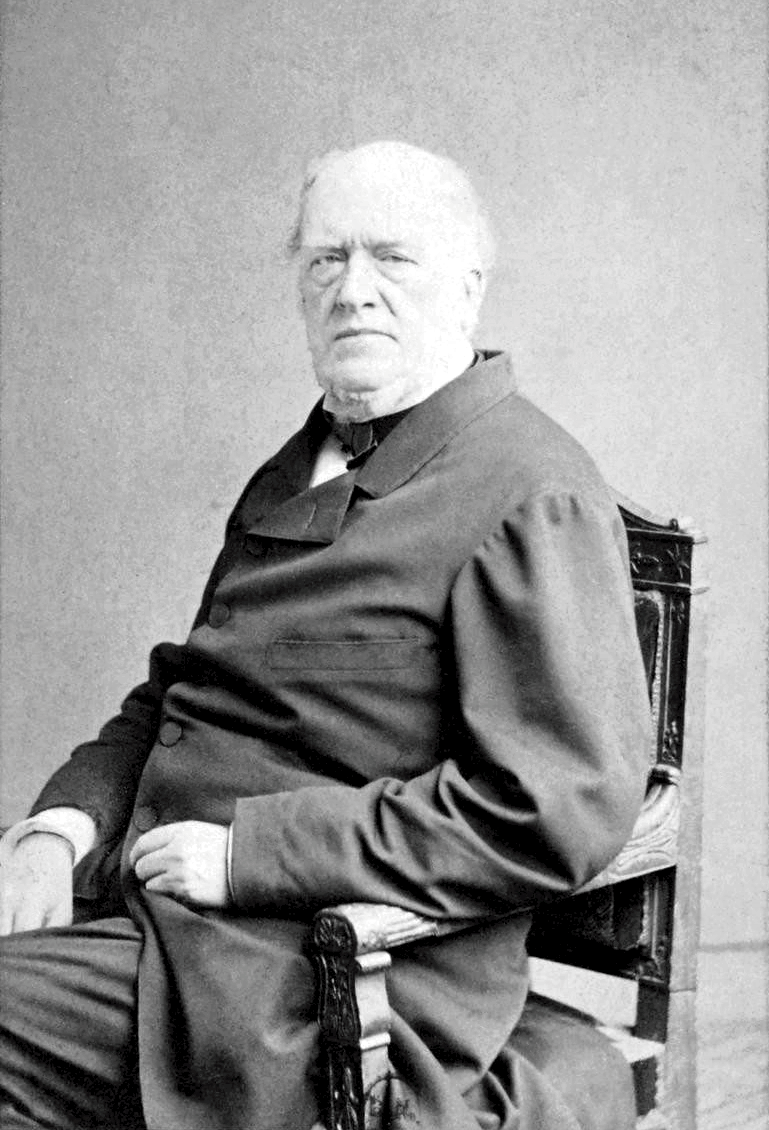
Photograph of Honoré Théodore d'Albert, 8th Duke of Luynes

The grandfather of the first Duke of Luynes was Léon d'Alberti, who changed the family name to Albert and married Jeanne de Ségur of Marseille in 1535. From the marriage he received a dowry of 10,000 livres and the fief of Luynes in today's département Bouches-du-Rhône in Provence. His son Honoré was born five years later. Léon d'Albert died in the Italian Wars. Honoré d'Albert (1540–1592), seigneur de Luynes, was in the service of the three last Valois kings and of Henry IV of France, and became colonel of the French bands, commissary of artillery in Languedoc and governor of Beaucaire. Honoré d'Albert had three sons:

- Charles (1578–1621), a favorite of Louis XIII, became the first Duke of Luynes in August 1619. He had recently purchased the Comté de Maillé on the Loire, about 10 miles west of Tours, and the king erected Maillé into the Duchy of Luynes, which included about 50 parishes and extended to the western wall of Tours and around it on three sides.
- Honoré (1581–1649), first Duke of Chaulnes, was seigneur de Cadenet and married Charlotte Eugenie d'Ailly, countess of Chaulnes, in 1619, and was created Duke of Chaulnes in 1621. He was governor of Picardy and marshal of France (1619), and defended his province successfully in 1625 and 1635. He is also responsible for the French translation of René Descartes's Meditations, from Latin, in 1647.
- Léon (1582–1630), seigneur de Brantes, who became Duke of Luxembourg-Piney by his marriage in 1620 with Margaret Charlotte of Luxembourg.

After the death of the first Duke of Luynes in 1621, his widow, Marie de Rohan remarried to Claude of Lorraine, Duke of Chevreuse, from whom she acquired in 1655 the duchy of Chevreuse, which she gave to Louis Charles d'Albert, her son by her first husband, in 1663. From that point forward, the title of Duke of Chevreuse and Duke of Luynes was borne by the eldest sons of the family of Luynes, which also inherited the title of Duke of Chaulnes on the extinction of the descendants of Honoré d'Albert in 1698. The branch of the dukes of Luxemburg-Piney became extinct in 1697.

=== Other notable family members ===
Some other notable family members are:

- Louis Auguste d'Albert d'Ailly (1676–1744), Duke of Chaulnes, became marshal of France (1741). He was a younger son of Charles Honoré d'Albert, 3rd Duke of Luynes.
- Louis Joseph d'Albert de Luynes (1670–1750), 3rd Prince of Grimberghen: married to Magdeleine Marie de Berghes. He was in the service of the Emperor Charles VII, and became field-marshal and ambassador in France. He was a younger son of Louis Charles d'Albert, 2nd Duke of Luynes from the Duke's second marriage to Princess Anne de Rohan-Montbazon.

Several members of the family of Albert were distinguished in letters and science, including Louis Charles d'Albert, 2nd Duke of Luynes, who was an ascetic writer and friend of the Jansenists, and Honoré Theodore d'Albert, 8th Duke of Luynes, who was a writer on archaeology. Others include:

- Paul d'Albert de Luynes (1703–1788), Cardinal and Archbishop of Sens; an astronomer. He was a son of Honoré Charles d'Albert de Luynes, Duke of Montfort and Chevreuse, and younger brother of Charles Philippe d'Albert de Luynes, 4th Duke of Luynes.
- Michel Ferdinand d'Albert d'Ailly (1714–1769), Duke of Chaulnes and Picquigny; a writer on mathematical instruments. He was a son of Louis Auguste d'Albert d'Ailly, 4th Duke of Chaulnes.
- Louis Joseph d'Albert d'Ailly (1741–1793), Duke of Chaulnes and Picquigny; a chemist who was elected a Fellow of the Royal Society in London in 1764. He was a son of Michel Ferdinand d'Albert d'Ailly, Duke of Chaulnes and Picquigny.

== List of dukes of Luynes ==
List of dukes of Luynes since 1619:

| Number | From | To | Duke of Luynes | Relationship to predecessor |
|---|---|---|---|---|
| 1 | 1619 | 1621 | Charles d'Albert de Luynes (1578–1621) | 1st Duke of Luynes |
| 2 | 1621 | 1690 | Louis Charles d'Albert de Luynes (1620–1699) | Son of the preceding (Note: Louis Charles d'Albert de Luynes was the father of Jeanne Baptiste d'Albert de Luynes, comtesse de Verrue (1670–1736), who is best known today as the mistress of King Victor Amadeus II of Sardinia. Although married to Giuseppe Ignazio Scaglia, Conte di Verua, she had two children with Victor Amadeus II: Maria Vittoria Francesca of Savoy (1690–1766), the Marchioness of Susa who married Victor Amadeus, Prince of Carignan, and Vittorio Francesco Filippo of Savoy (1694-1762), the Marquis of Susa who married Maria Lucrezia Franchi di Pont.) |
| 3 | 1690 | 1712 | Charles Honoré d'Albert de Luynes (1646–1712) | Son of the preceding |
| 4 | 1712 | 1758 | Charles Philippe d'Albert de Luynes (1695–1758) | Grandson of the preceding (Note: Charles Philippe d'Albert de Luynes, 4th Duke of Luynes (1695–1758) was the eldest son of Honoré Charles d'Albert de Luynes (1669–1704), styled the Duke of Montfort then the Duke of Chevreuse. The 4th Dukes younger brother was the astronomer Paul d'Albert de Luynes (1703–1788), Cardinal and Archbishop of Sens.) |
| 5 | 1758 | 1771 | Marie Charles d'Albert de Luynes (1717–1771) | Son of the preceding |
| 6 | 1771 | 1807 | Louis Joseph Charles Amable d'Albert de Luynes (1748–1807) | Son of the preceding |
| 7 | 1807 | 1839 | Charles Marie d'Albert de Luynes (1783–1839) | Son of the preceding |
| 8 | 1839 | 1867 | Honoré Théodore Paul Joseph d'Albert (1803–1867) | Son of the preceding |
| 9 | 1867 | 1870 | Charles Honoré Emmanuel d'Albert de Luynes (1846–1870) | Grandson of the preceding |
| 10 | 1870 | 1924 | Honoré Charles Marie Sosthène d'Albert de Luynes (1868–1924) | Son of the preceding |
| 11 | 1924 | 1993 | Philippe Anne Louis Marie Dieudonné Jean d'Albert (1905–1993) | Son of the preceding |
| 12 | 1993 | 2008 | Jean d'Albert de Luynes (1945–2008) | Son of the preceding |
| 13 | 2008 | Incumbent | Philippe d'Albert, 13th duc de Luynes (b. 1977) | Son of the preceding |

== See also ==
- Duke of Chaulnes
- Duke of Chevreuse
- Lords, counts and dukes of Montfort-l'Amaury
