= Château de Luynes =

French medieval castle

Luynes's Castle
- Château de Luynes
- Luynes, Indre-et-Loire in France
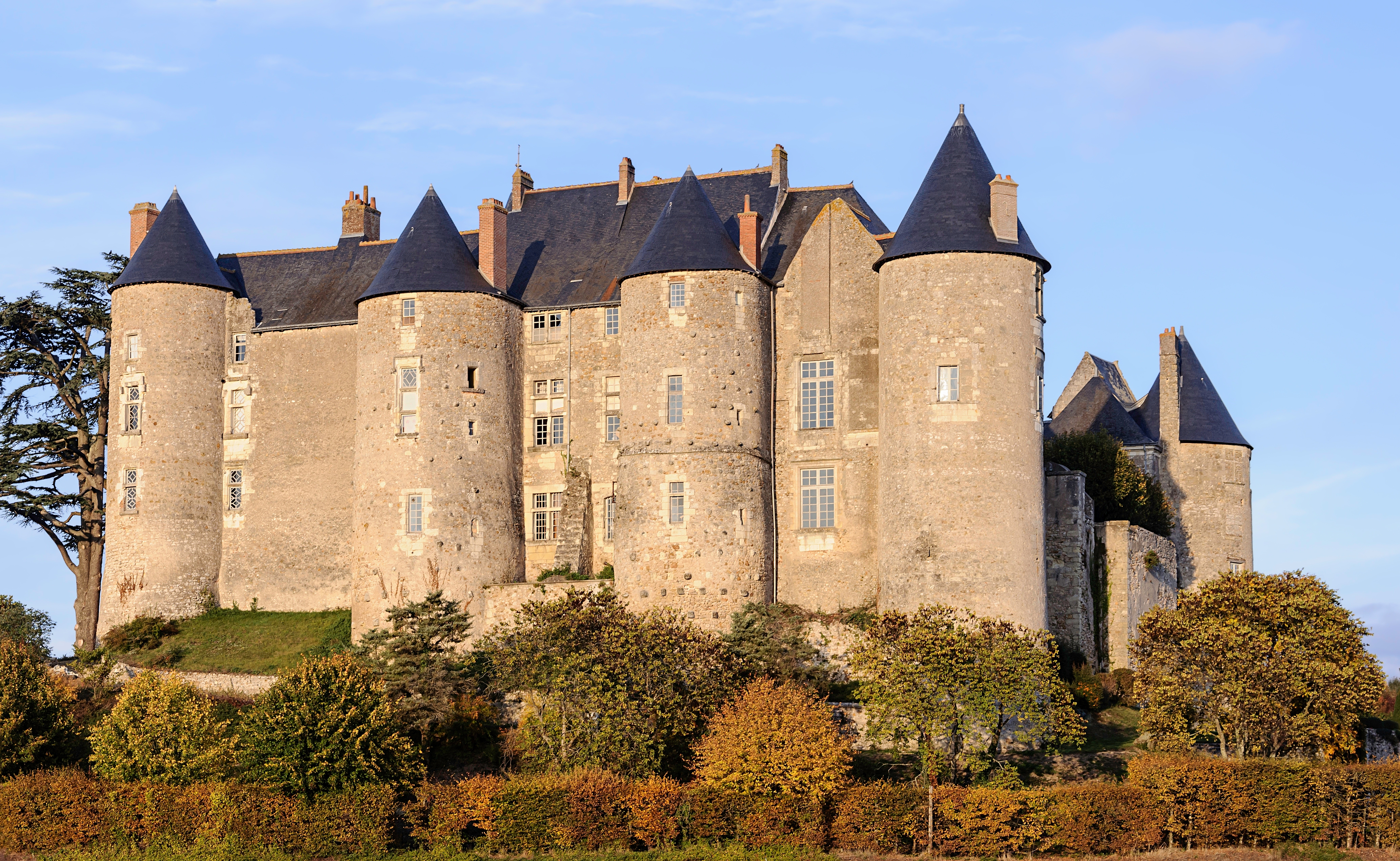
- Luynes's castle, east side view

Site information
- Owner: House of Albert of Luynes

Location
- Coordinates: 47°23′11″N 0°33′13″E

Site history
- Built: 13th century

The Château de Luynes is a castle located in Luynes, Indre-et-Loire, France. It is first a medieval fortress, built in the 13th century, on a rocky promontory, overlooking the Loire Valley.

== History ==
Built as a medieval fortress in the 13th century, The castle is today a grand manor house on a rocky promontory overlooking the val de Loire, and has been subject to registration as an historical monument since July 17, 1926.

The entry in the Monuments historiques register, describes the castle as a quadrangular surface at the edge of a spur. The most important part of the defences is located on the West... four cylindrical towers which ... date from the 13th century and 15th century.

The castle was substantially rebuilt in the 15th century, the current windows replaced primitive arrow slits and the wall between the towers was perforated by mullioned windows, evidence then of building next to this part of the enclosure. The South curtain wall is today replaced by a terrace and an outer defensive wall with two small round towers can still be discerned. In the 17th century a pavilion, was constructed at the back of the Southeast Tower.

== Gallery ==
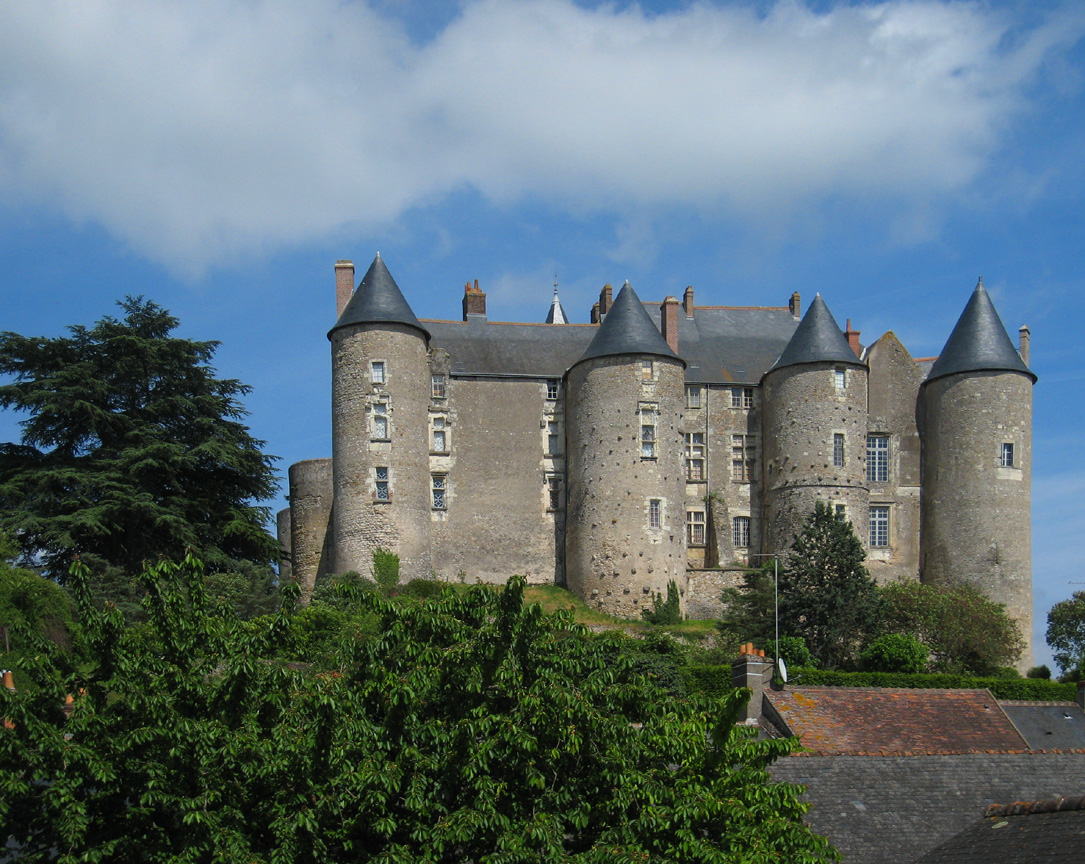
West view.

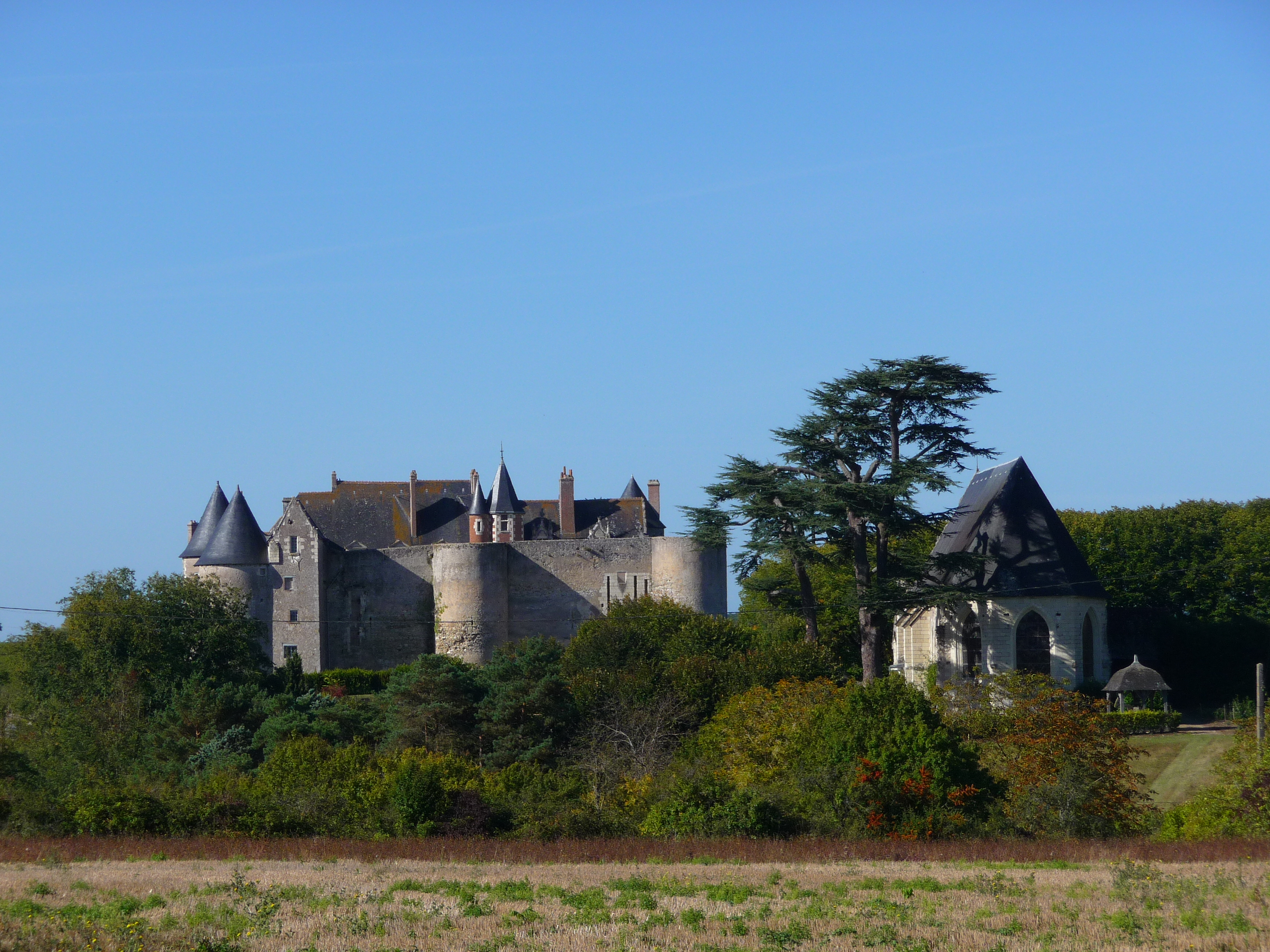
Castle & chapelle, east view.

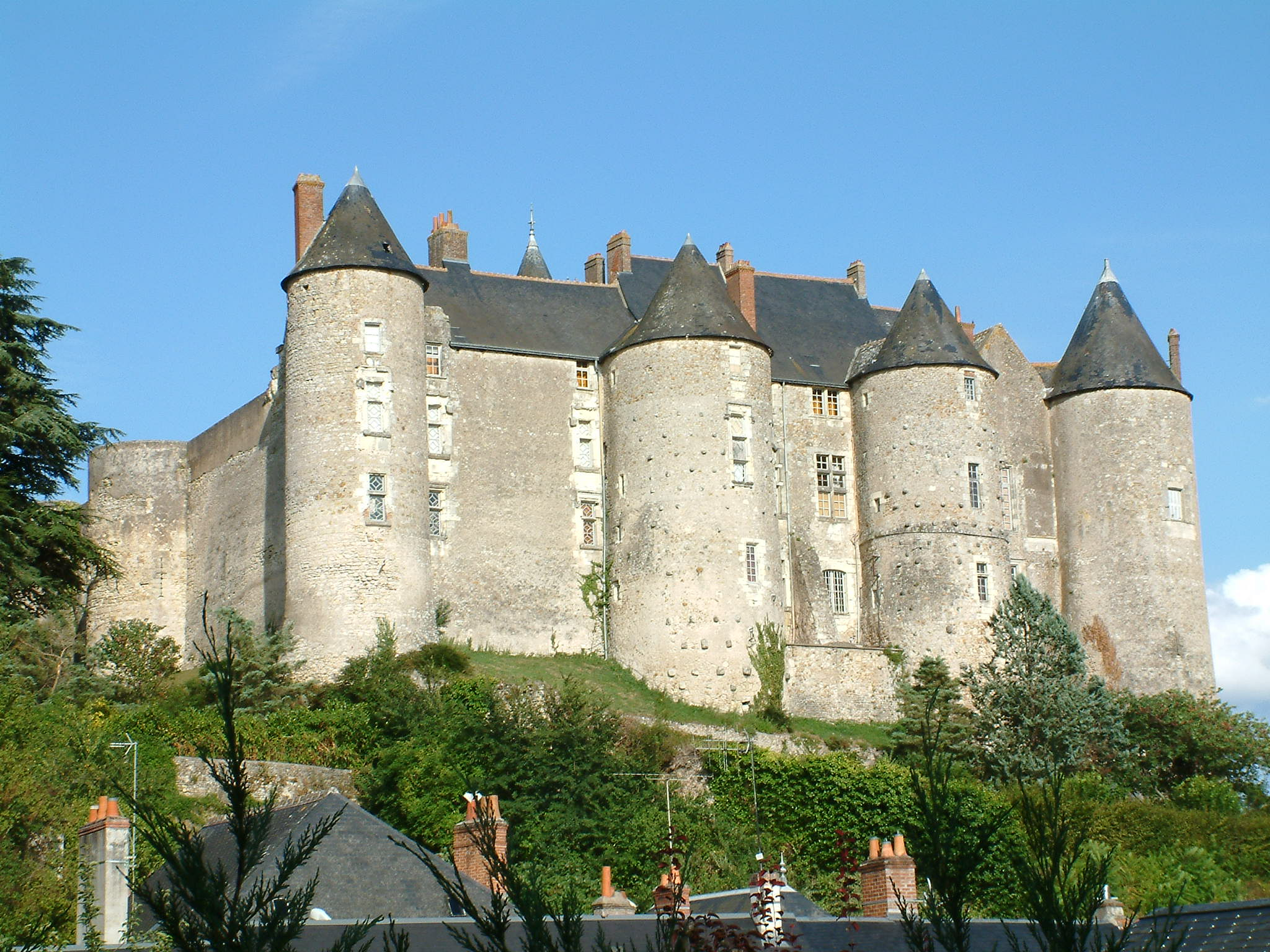
West view.

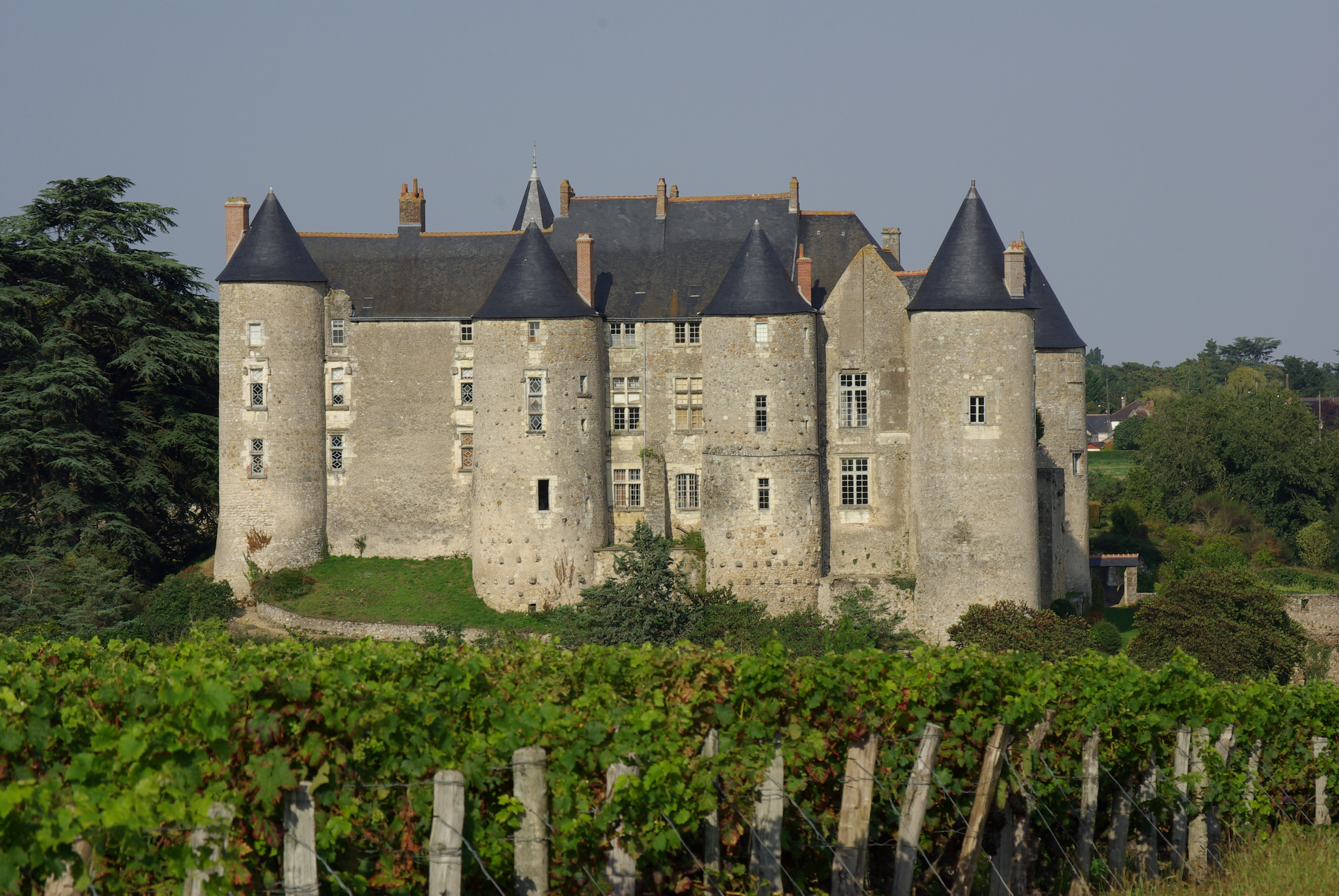
West view.

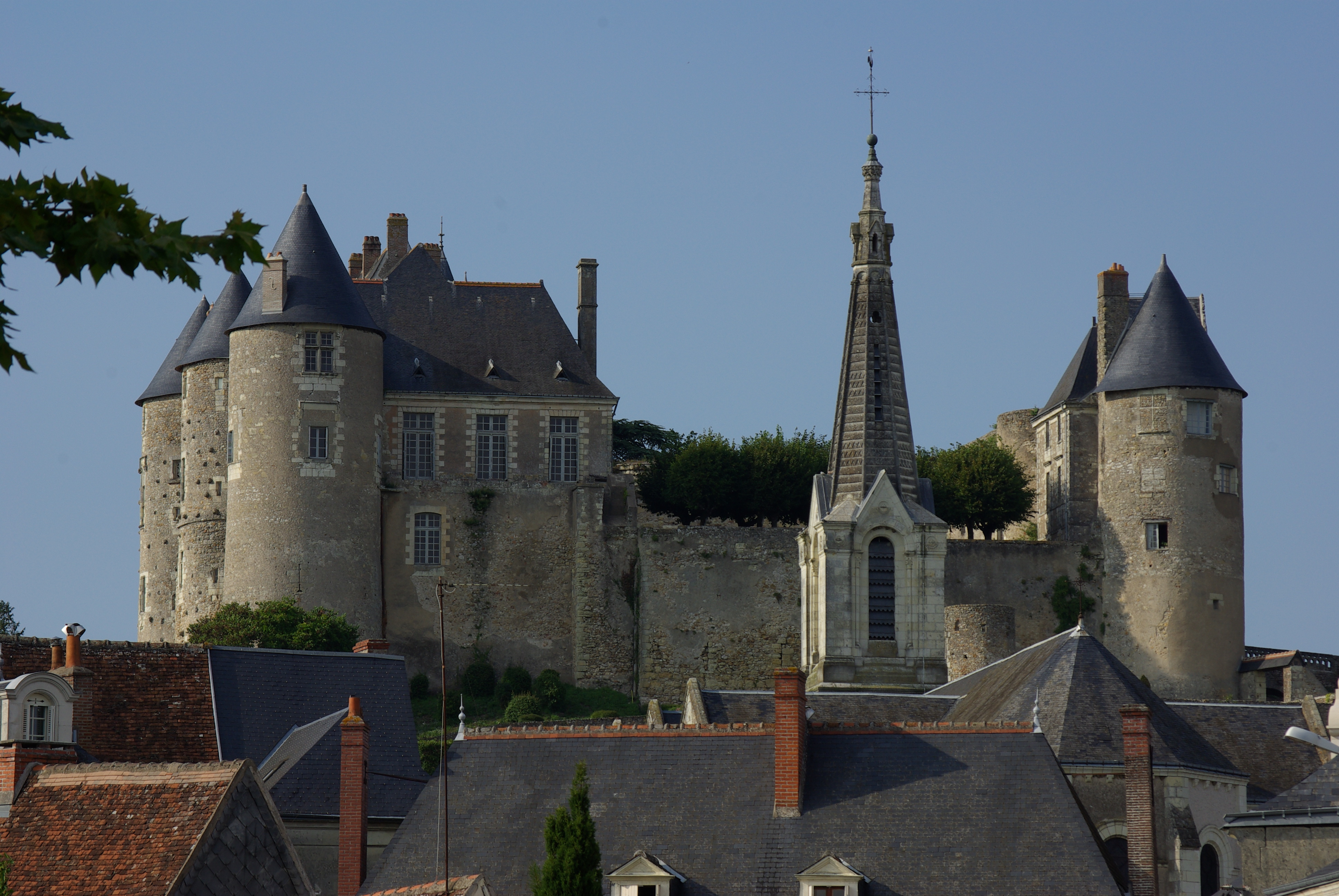
South view.

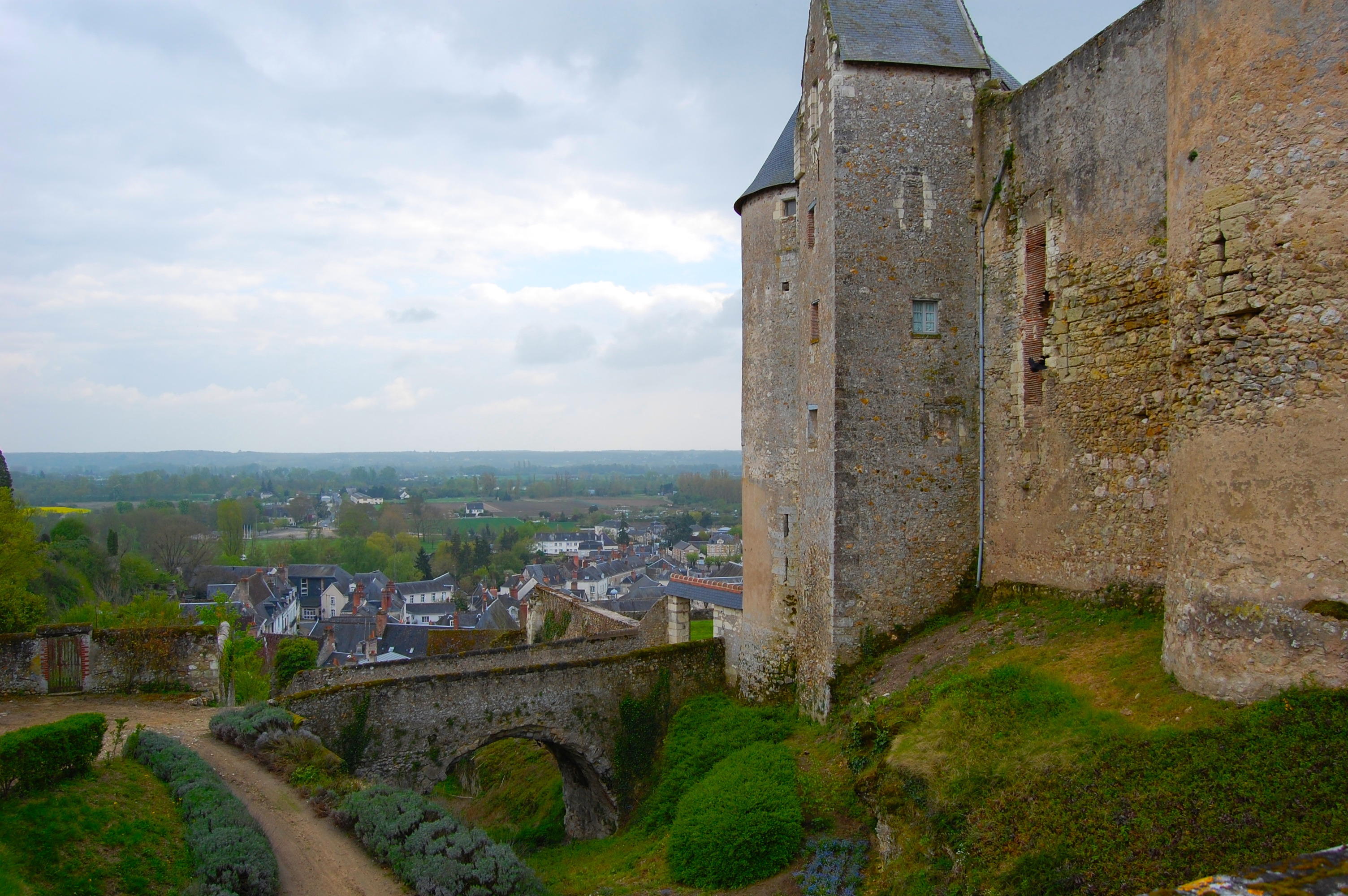
Moat and castle, east view.

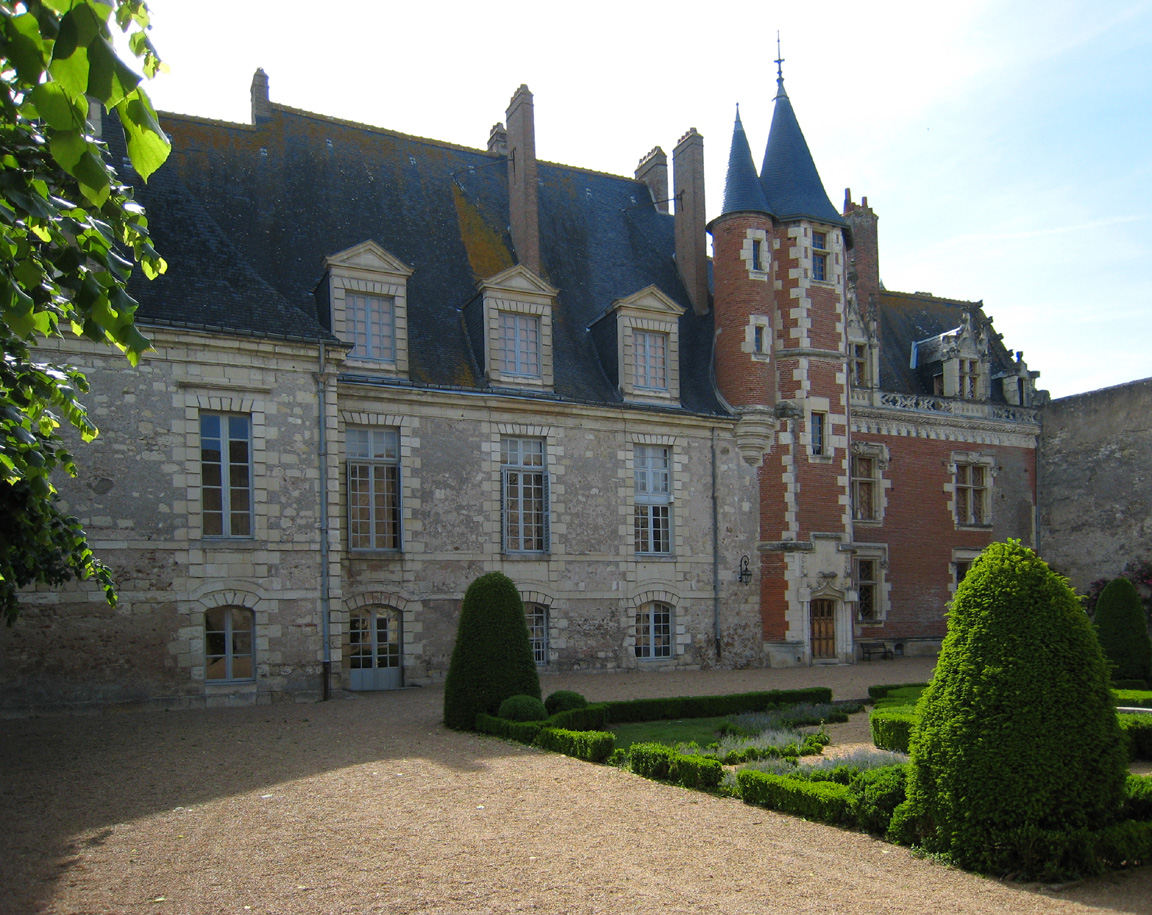
Castle's courtyard.

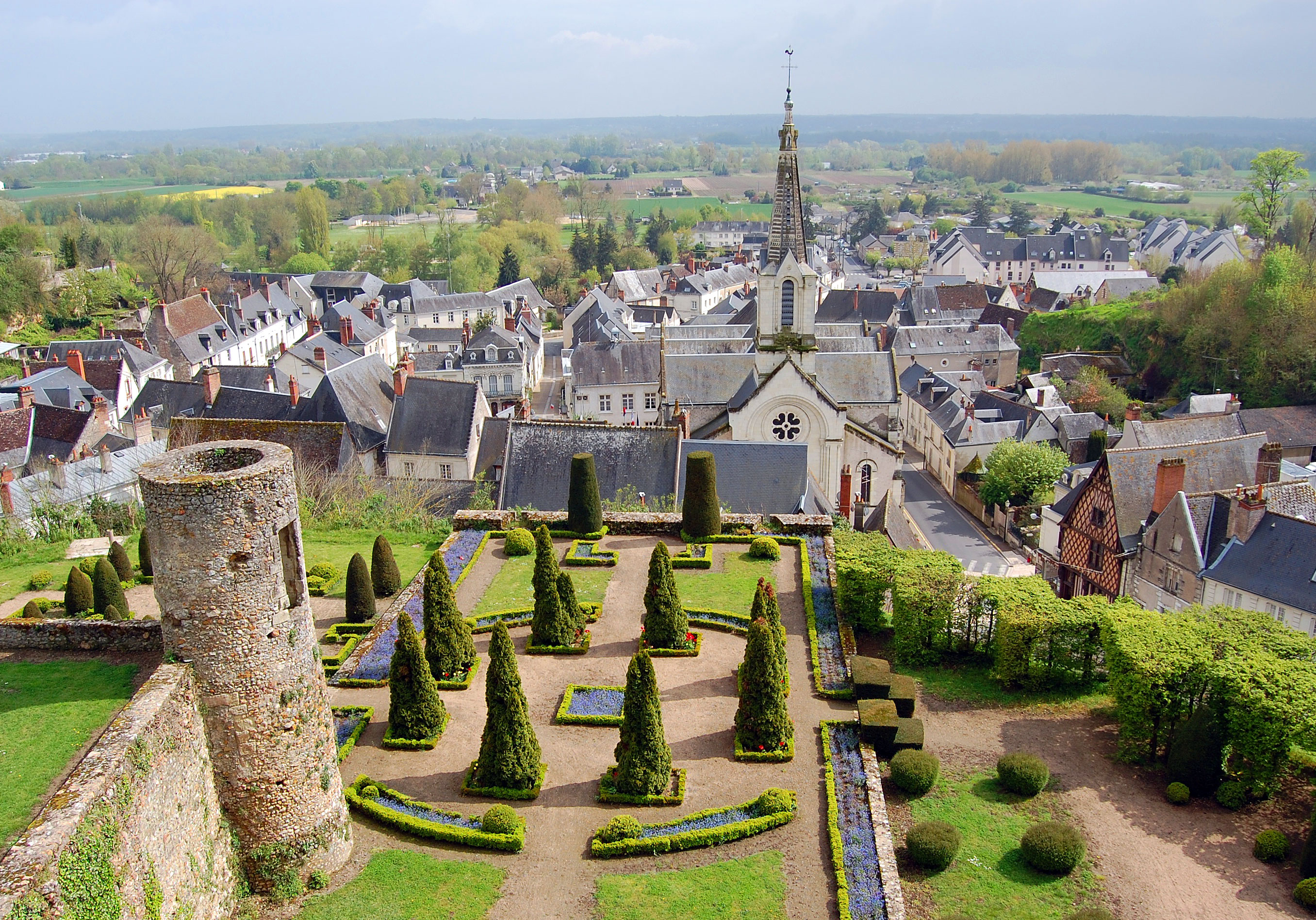
Luynes seen from the castle, to the South.
