= Duke of Chevreuse =

French noble title

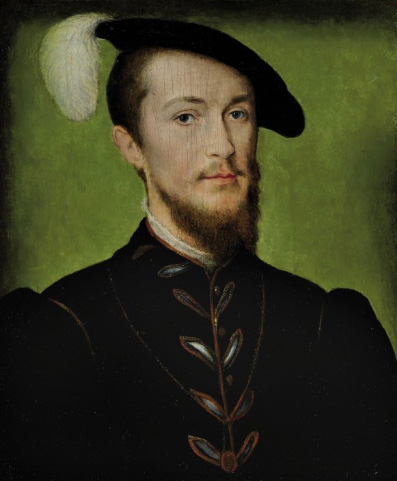
Portrait of Jean IV de Brosse, 1st Duke of Chevreuse, by Corneille de Lyon, c. 1535

Duke of Chevreuse (French Duc de Chevreuse) was a French title of nobility, elevated from the barony of Chevreuse in 1545.

== History ==
The duchy of Chevreuse was originally created for Jean de Brosse, Duc d'Étampes, it was transferred in 1555 to Charles of Guise, the Cardinal of Lorraine, and became a possession of the House of Guise, becoming the title of the Cardinal's grandnephew, Charles de Guise (1578–1657). It was sold in 1655 to his wife, Marie de Rohan, who transferred it to the son of her first marriage, the Duc de Luynes. It has since been held by the ducs de Luynes.

== Dukes of Chevreuse ==
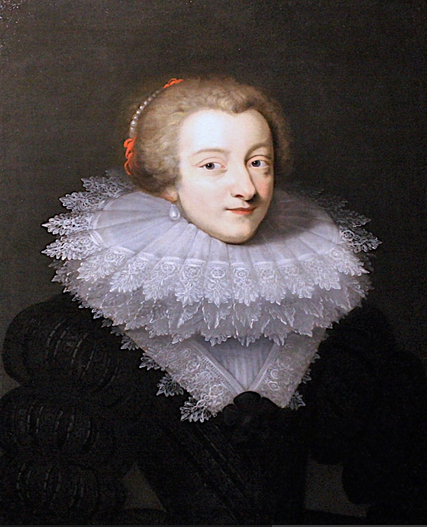
Portrait of Marie de Rohan, suo jure 5th Duchess of Chevreuse, by the circle of Daniel Dumonstier, c. 1621

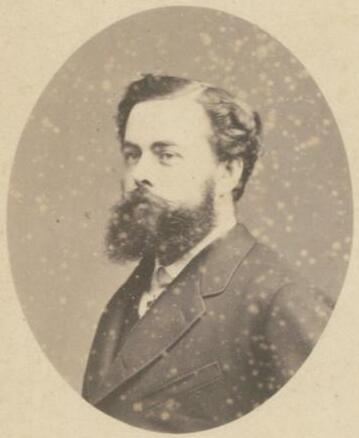
Charles Honoré d'Albert, 13th Duke of Chevreuse

List of dukes of Chevreuse since 1545:

Number	From	To	Duke of Chevreuse	Relationship to predecessor
1	1545	1555	Jean IV de Brosse	1st Duke of Chevreuse (Note: Jean IV de Brosse was compelled to sell the duchy and the lands of Meudon to Charles, Cardinal of Lorraine in return for 50,000 écus.)
2	1555	1574	Charles I	
3	1574	1606	Charles II	Great-nephew of the preceding
4	1606	1655	Claude	Brother of the preceding (Note: Elevated to Duke-Peer in 1612; Peerage extinct 1655 upon sale of duchy.)
5	1655	1663	Marie de Rohan	Wife of the preceding
6	1663		Louis Charles d'Albert	Son of the preceding
7	1663	1704	Charles Honoré d'Albert	Son of the preceding
8	1704	1735	Charles Philippe d'Albert	Grandson of the preceding
9	1735	1768	Marie Charles Louis d'Albert	Son of the preceding
10	1768	1807	Louis-Joseph-Charles-Amable d'Albert	Son of the preceding
11	1807	1839	Charles Marie Paul André d'Albert	Son of the preceding
12	1839	1867	Honoré Théodoric d'Albert de Luynes	Son of the preceding (Note: His only son, Honoré-Louis d'Albert de Luynes (1823–1854), styled Duke of Chevreuse, predeceased him in 1854.)
13	1867	1870	Charles Honoré Emmanuel d'Albert	Grandson of the preceding
14	1870	1923	Honoré Charles Marie Sosthène d'Albert	Son of the preceding
15	1923	1993	Philippe d'Albert	Son of the preceding
16	1993	2008	Jean d'Albert de Luynes	Son of the preceding
17	2008	Incumbent	Philippe d'Albert	Son of the preceding

== See also ==
- Duke of Luynes
- Peerage of France
