= Château de Dampierre =

Castle in Île-de-France, France

Coordinates: 48°42′18″N 1°59′17″E

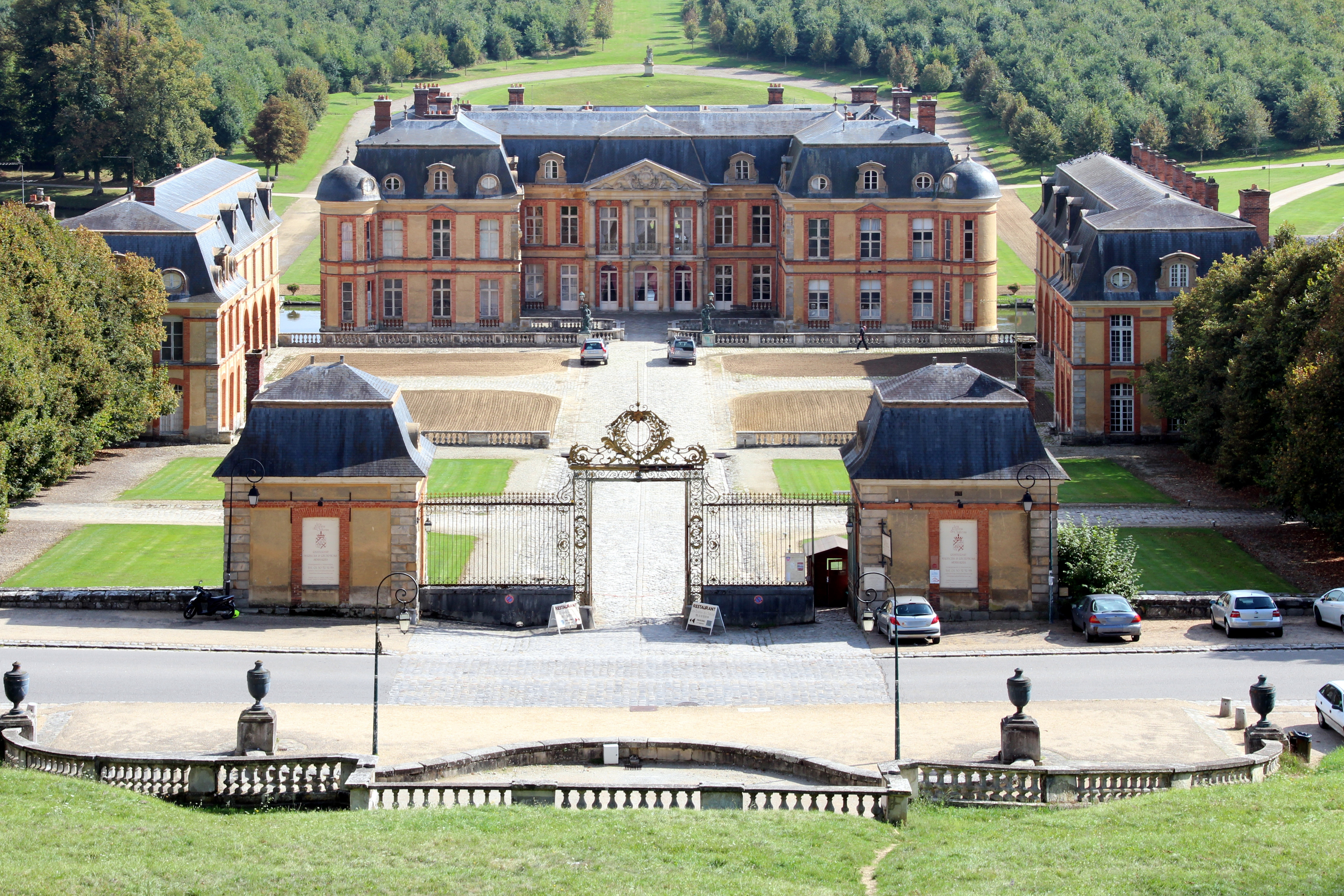
Château de Dampierre: domesticated Baroque at the centre of Louis XIV's inner circle

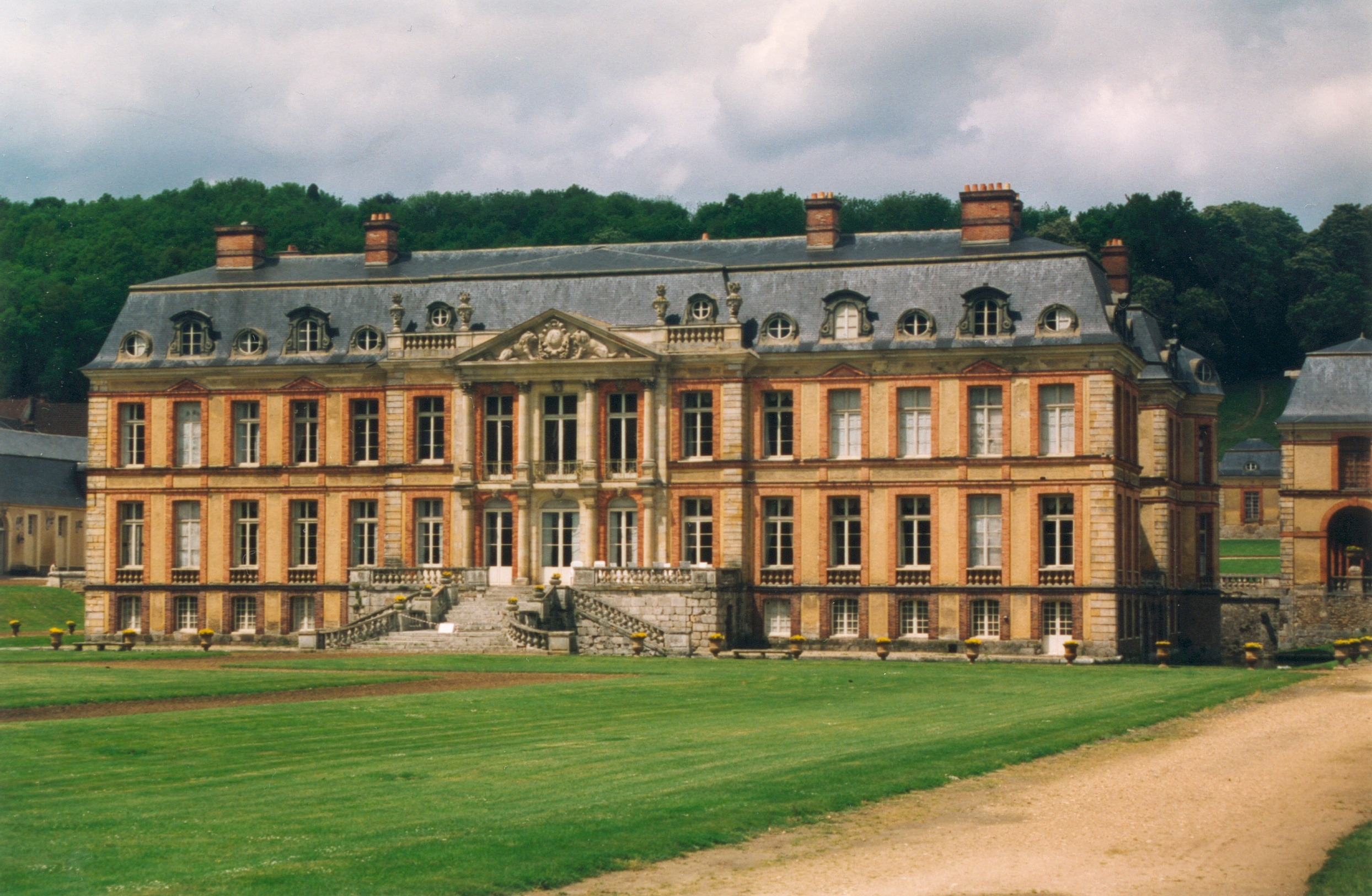
Another view of the château

The Château de Dampierre (French pronunciation: [ʃato d(ə) dɑ̃pjɛʁ]) is a French Baroque château in Dampierre-en-Yvelines, in the Vallée de Chevreuse, approximately 35 kilometres southwest of Paris. Built between 1675 and 1683 by Jules Hardouin-Mansart for the Duke of Chevreuse, it is surrounded by an extensive park with formal gardens traditionally attributed to André Le Nôtre.

The estate belonged to the House of Albert de Luynes for more than 350 years and was acquired in 2018 by French businessman Franky Mulliez. The château and its grounds were designated a classified historic monument (monument historique) in 2022.

== History ==
The château was rebuilt between 1675 and 1683 by Jules Hardouin-Mansart for the Duke of Chevreuse, son-in-law of Jean-Baptiste Colbert. It is an example of late seventeenth-century French Baroque architecture.

In the nineteenth century, Honoré Théodoric d'Albert de Luynes, an archaeologist and art collector, commissioned architect Félix Duban to renovate the château. The works included the refurbishment of its interiors and the decoration of the Grande Galerie, involving artists such as Pierre-Charles Simart and Jean-Auguste-Dominique Ingres.

After more than 350 years in the possession of the Luynes family, the château was acquired in 2018 by French businessman Franky Mulliez, founder of Kiloutou, who initiated a major restoration programme.

== Architecture and gardens ==
The main building (corps de logis) and its outbuildings are arranged symmetrically around a paved and gravelled cour d'honneur, enclosed by wrought-iron gates. The château's relatively modest scale distinguishes it from larger contemporary residences such as Vaux-le-Vicomte.

The Grande Galerie was redesigned by Félix Duban in the nineteenth century, with sculptural decoration by Pierre-Charles Simart. Ingres was commissioned to paint two large compositions, The Golden Age and The Iron Age, but the project remained unfinished.

The formal gardens, traditionally attributed to André Le Nôtre, feature an extensive canal, ornamental basins and landscaped terraces. Their precise authorship remains debated, with some specialists attributing their design to Hardouin-Mansart. The park also includes an eighteenth-century garden pavilion and suffered significant damage during the storm of December 1999.

In 2025, the south parterre underwent a major restoration, including the reconstruction of seven ornamental basins around the surviving Belle Hélène basin, restoring the historic garden perspectives.

== Notable residents and visitors ==
The estate has been associated with several prominent figures in French history. Marie de Rohan, Duchess of Chevreuse, a leading political figure during the reign of Louis XIII, was closely connected with the earlier château that preceded the present building. The property subsequently passed to her descendants in the House of Albert de Luynes.

During the seventeenth and eighteenth centuries, Dampierre received members of the French royal family, including Louis XV. Queen Marie Leszczyńska, the wife of Louis XV, was a frequent guest and had apartments in the château. Madame de Pompadour also visited the estate.

== Heritage protection ==
The château was first registered as a French Monument historique on 30 May 1928, together with its outbuildings, entrance pavilions, gates and watering trough. On 3 February 2022, the French Ministry of Culture granted the estate the stronger status of a classified historic monument, extending protection to the gardens, parkland, boundary walls and statuary.

The estate encompasses approximately 400 hectares, enclosed by a 14-kilometre boundary wall whose present configuration dates from the late eighteenth century.

== See also ==
- List of Baroque residences
