= Dampierre-en-Yvelines =

- Commune
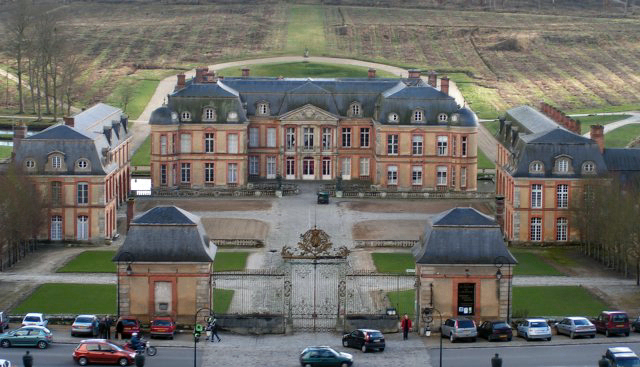
- Chateau of Dampierre-en-Yvelines

- Coat of arms
- Location of Dampierre-en-Yvelines
- Location within France Location within Île-de-France (region)
- Coordinates: 48°42′17″N 1°59′06″E
- Country: France
- Region: Île-de-France
- Department: Yvelines
- Arrondissement: Rambouillet
- Canton: Maurepas

Government
  - Mayor (2020–2026): Valérie Palmer
- Area^{1}: 11.17 km^{2} (4.31 sq mi)
- Elevation: 100 m (330 ft)
- Highest elevation: 178 m (584 ft)
- Lowest elevation: 85 m (279 ft)
- Population (2023): 1,008
  - Density: 90.24/km^{2} (233.7/sq mi)
- Time zone: UTC+01:00 (CET)
  - Summer (DST): UTC+02:00 (CEST)
- INSEE/Postal code: 78193 /78720
- ^{1} French Land Register data, which excludes lakes, ponds, glaciers > 1 km^{2} (0.386 sq mi or 247 acres) and river estuaries.

Dampierre-en-Yvelines (French pronunciation: [dɑ̃pjɛʁ ɑ̃.n‿ivlin]) is a commune in the Yvelines department in the Île-de-France region in north-central France. It was created in 1974 by the merger of two former communes: Dampierre and Maincourt-sur-Yvette.

== The Castle of Dampierre ==
One of the main features of the commune is the prominently featured castle, or chateau, of Dampierre. Hired by the Luynes family, the architect Jules Hardouin-Mansart built Dampierre while he was working on the Palace of Versailles for the King Louis XIV.

=== 15th and 16th century ===
Jean Duval, treasurer of King Francis the Ist, bought the Castle of Dampiere in 1528 and rebuilt it into the Renaissance style. Cardinal Charles de Lorraine, archbishop of Reims, became Duke of Chevreuse in 1552, and decided to move the duchy's siege from the medieval castle of La Madeleine in Chevreuse, considered as too austere, to the confortable Castle of Dampierre. Charles de Lorraine made it bigger and embellished it with the help of Italian painter Francesco Salviati and architect Le Primatice.

In his book ‘The Most Excellent Buildings of France‘, Jacques I Androuet du Cerceau illustrates and documents this building.

=== 18th century ===
During the 18th century, the outside appearance of the castle did not change much. However, many ameliorations were made in the different rooms, where intricate woodwork replaced the worn out ornaments of the 17th century.

In 1758, an imposing entrance gate was installed in front of the castle.

=== 19th century ===
Honoré Théodoric d'Albert de Luynes, the eighth Duke of Luynes, undertook deep restorations in order to showcase his scientific collection.

He hired Felix Duban to remodel the castle in the taste of the day while still maintaining the century-long history of the building.

This created a mix of different styles brought by all the greatest artists of the time.

== People ==
- Honoré d'Albert, Dukes of Luynes (1868–1924)
- Éric Judor, humorist

== See also ==
- Communes of the Yvelines department
- Château de Dampierre
