= Luynes, Indre-et-Loire =

Luynes
- Commune
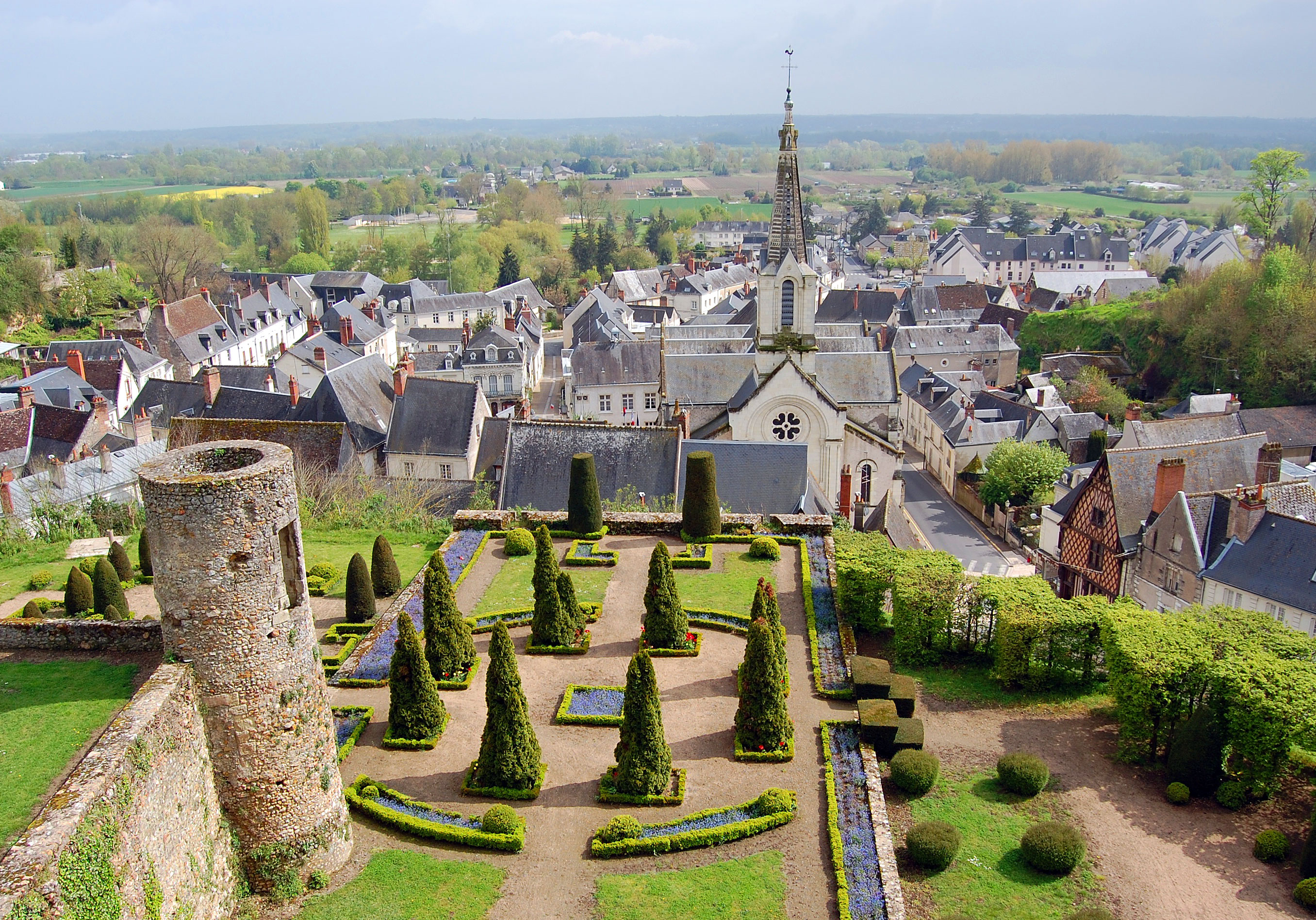
- Luynes seen from the castle

- Coat of arms
- Location of Luynes
- Location within France Location within Centre-Val de Loire
- Coordinates: 47°23′28″N 0°33′19″E
- Country: France
- Region: Centre-Val de Loire
- Department: Indre-et-Loire
- Arrondissement: Tours
- Canton: Saint-Cyr-sur-Loire
- Intercommunality: Tours Métropole Val de Loire

Government
  - Mayor (2020–2026): Bertrand Ritouret
- Area^{1}: 34.01 km^{2} (13.13 sq mi)
- Highest elevation: 105 m (344 ft)
- Lowest elevation: 39 m (128 ft)
- Population (2023): 5,062
  - Density: 148.8/km^{2} (385.5/sq mi)
- Time zone: UTC+01:00 (CET)
  - Summer (DST): UTC+02:00 (CEST)
- INSEE/Postal code: 37139 /37230
- Website: luynes.fr
- ^{1} French Land Register data, which excludes lakes, ponds, glaciers > 1 km^{2} (0.386 sq mi or 247 acres) and river estuaries.

Luynes (French: [lɥin]) is a commune in the Indre-et-Loire department in central France.

== Population ==
Historical population

Year	Pop.	±% p.a.
1793	2,136	—
1800	2,169	+0.22%
1806	2,096	−0.57%
1821	2,004	−0.30%
1831	2,165	+0.78%
1836	2,098	−0.63%
1841	2,003	−0.92%
1846	2,187	+1.77%
1851	2,127	−0.55%
1856	2,109	−0.17%
1861	2,057	−0.50%
1866	2,047	−0.10%
1872	1,981	−0.54%
1876	1,970	−0.14%
1881	1,992	+0.22%
1886	2,014	+0.22%
1891	1,948	−0.66%
1896	1,948	+0.00%
1901	1,846	−1.07%

Year	Pop.	±% p.a.
1906	1,869	+0.25%
1911	1,734	−1.49%
1921	1,530	−1.24%
1926	1,551	+0.27%
1931	1,517	−0.44%
1936	1,533	+0.21%
1946	1,663	+0.82%
1954	1,688	+0.19%
1962	1,699	+0.08%
1968	1,948	+2.31%
1975	2,614	+4.29%
1982	3,834	+5.62%
1990	4,128	+0.93%
1999	4,501	+0.97%
2007	5,025	+1.39%
2012	5,259	+0.91%
2017	5,097	−0.62%
2023	5,062	−0.11%

Source: EHESS and INSEE (1968-2023)

== Sights ==
The Castle of Luynes has been registered as a historic site since 1926. The construction started in the 13th century, and the building was redesigned in the 15th and 17th century.

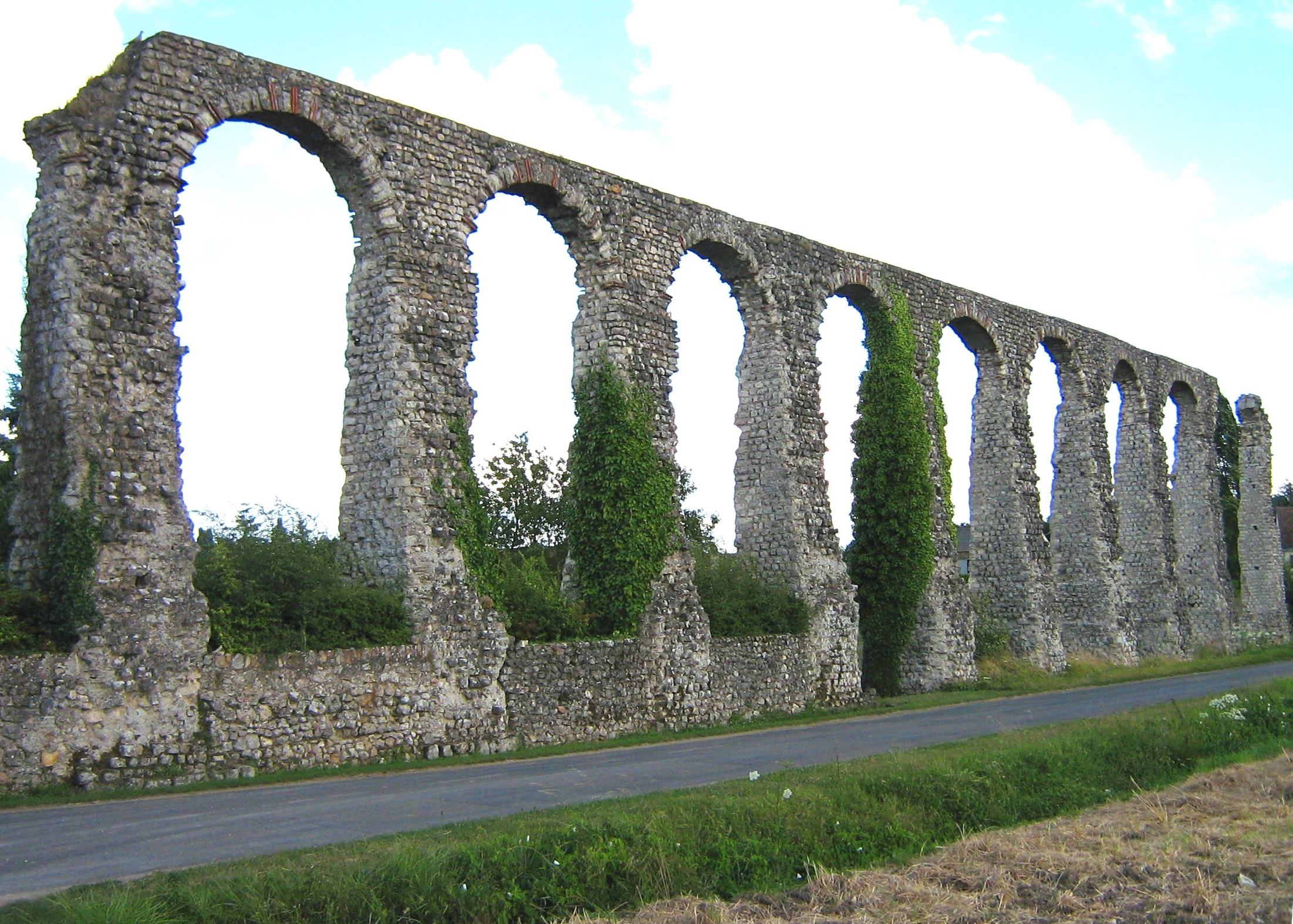
Luynes Aqueduct

A Roman aqueduct which carried water to Tours is visible as a series of piers, some still connected by arches, where it crosses a small valley between Luynes and Fondettes.

== See also ==
- Communes of the Indre-et-Loire department
