= Honoré-Louis d'Albert de Luynes =

French nobleman

The Duke of Chevreuse

Personal details
- Born: Honoré-Louis d'Albert de Luynes; 3 February 1823
- Died: 9 January 1854 (aged 30)
- Spouse: Valentine-Julie de Contades (m. 1843; died 1854)
- Relations: Emmanuel d'Albert de Luynes (grandson)
- Children: Marie Julie d'Albert de Luynes; Charles Honoré Emmanuel d'Albert de Luynes; Paul Marie Stanislas Honoré d'Albert de Luynes
- Parent(s): Honoré Théodoric d'Albert de Luynes; Marie Françoise Dauvet de Maineville

Honoré-Louis d'Albert de Luynes (3 February 1823 – 9 January 1854), styled Duke of Chevreuse, was a French nobleman.

== Early life ==
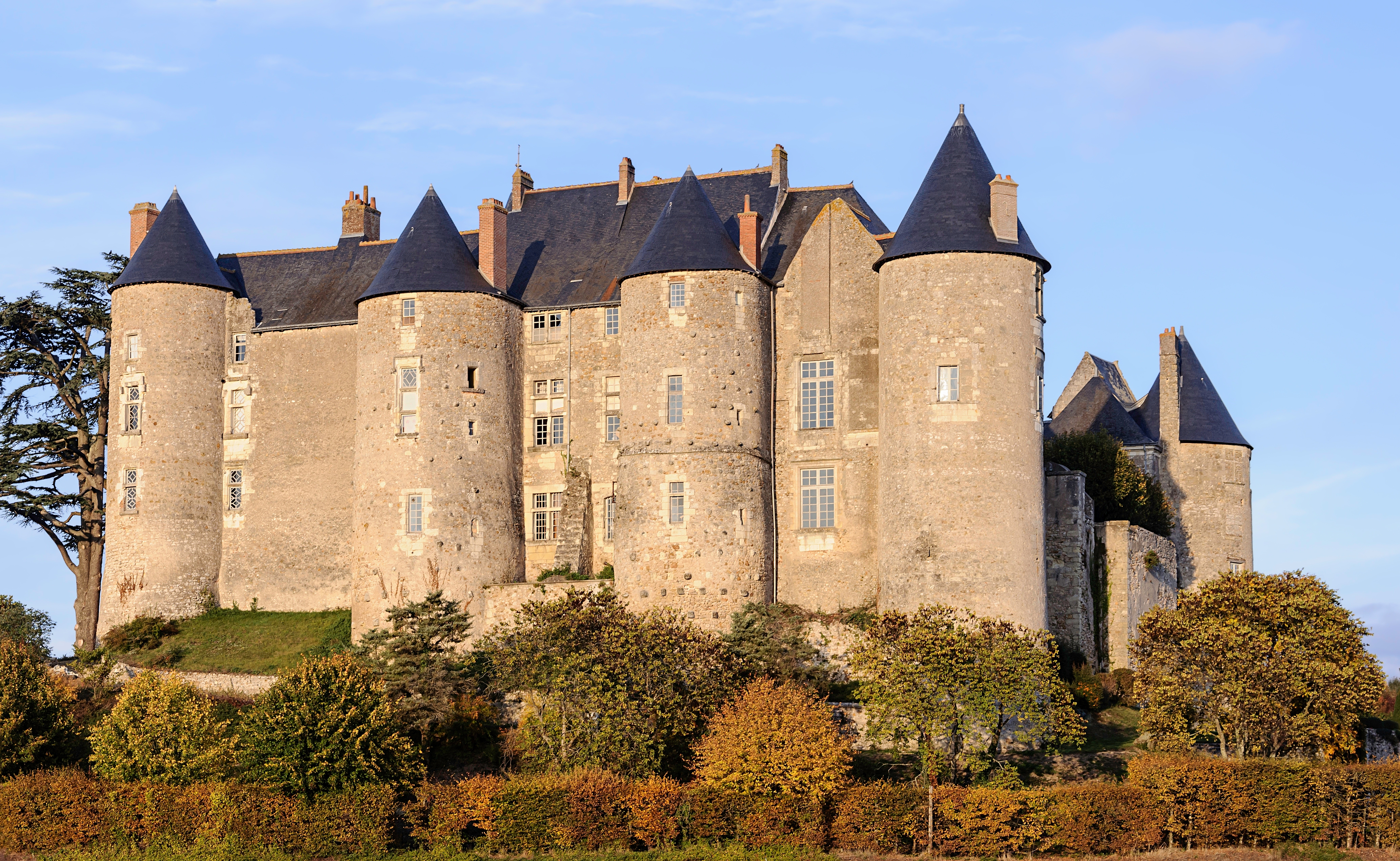
The Château de Luynes, 2011

He was the only child of Honoré Théodoric d'Albert de Luynes, 8th Duke of Luynes, and Marie Françoise Dauvet de Maineville, who were married from 1822 until her death on 23 July 1824. After his mother's death, his father married Jeanne d'Amys de Ponceau. His father was a prominent writer on archaeology who is most remembered for the collection of exhibits he gave to the Cabinet des Médailles, and for supporting the exiled Comte de Chambord's claim to the throne of France.

His father was the eldest son of Charles Marie d'Albert, 7th Duke of Luynes (a grandson of Guy André Pierre de Montmorency-Laval, 1st Duke of Laval) and Françoise Ermessinde de Narbonne-Pelet. His maternal grandparents were Gabriel-Nicolas Dauvet, Marquis de Maineville, and Marie-Françoise Vachon de Belmont-Briançon.

== Career ==
As the eldest, and only, son of the Duke of Luynes, who also held the dukedoms of Chevreuse and Chaulnes, Honoré-Louis used the title Duke of Chevreuse.

== Personal life ==
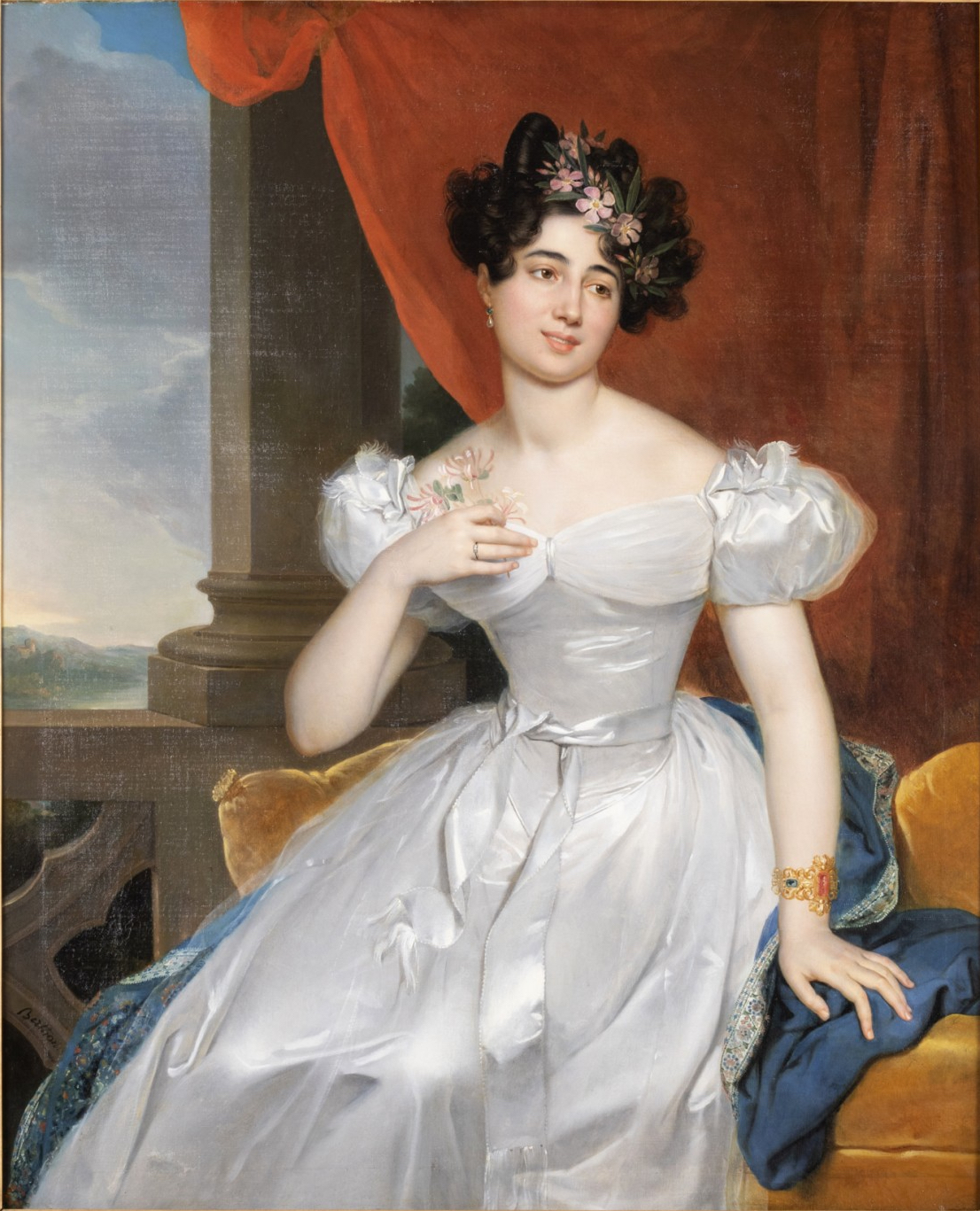
Portrait of his wife, Valentine de Contades, by René Théodore Berthon

On 12 September 1843, Luynes married Valentine-Julie de Contades (1824–1900), a daughter of French cavalry officer Jules Gaspard Amour de Contades, Viscount de Contades (son of François-Jules de Contades) and Gabrielle Adèle Alexandrine Amys du Ponceau. Together, they were the parents of:

- Marie Julie d'Albert de Luynes (1844–1865), who married Elzéar Charles Antoine de Sabran-Pontevès, 3rd Duke of Sabran, in 1863.
- Charles Honoré Emmanuel d'Albert de Luynes, 9th Duke of Luynes (1846–1870), who married Yolande de La Rochefoucauld, a daughter of Sosthène II de La Rochefoucauld, 4th Duke of Doudeauville and Princess Yolande de Polignac (a daughter of Prince Jules de Polignac, the 7th Prime Minister of France), in 1867.
- Paul Marie Stanislas Honoré d'Albert de Luynes, 10th Duke of Chaulnes and Picquigny (1852–1881), who married Princess Sophie Golitsyn, a daughter of Prince Augustin Golitsyn and granddaughter of Prince Pyotr Alexeyevich Golitsyn, in 1875.

The Duke of Chevreuse died on 9 January 1854, predeceasing his father. Upon his father's death in December 1867, his eldest son, Charles Honoré, inherited the dukedom of Luynes. His widow outlived him and all three of their children before her death in 1900.

=== Descendants ===
Through his only daughter Marie, he was posthumously a grandfather of Louise de Sabran-Pontevès (1864–1914), who married Jules Jean Marie de Baillardel, Baron of Lareinty, in 1885. In 1890, their son Jean de Lareinty-Tholozan was born and, in 1891, he was elevated to the title Marquis of Tholozan of Château de Guermantes, which had been held by his of his great-uncle, Ernest René, who died without issue. In 1892, Louise acquired the Château de Blain.

Through his eldest son, he was posthumously a grandfather of Honoré d'Albert de Luynes, 10th Duke of Luynes (1868–1924), who married Simone Louise Laure de Crussol d'Uzes, a daughter of Emmanuel de Crussol, 12th Duke of Uzès and Anne de Rochechouart de Mortemart (who inherited a large fortune from her great-grandmother, Madame Clicquot Ponsardin, founder of Veuve Clicquot).

Through his second son, he was posthumously a grandfather of Thérèse d'Albert de Luynes (1876–1941), who married Louis de Crussol d'Uzès, 14th Duke of Uzès (the younger brother of his cousin Honoré's wife), and Emmanuel d'Albert de Luynes, Duke of Chaulnes and Picquigny (1878–1908), who married American heiress Theodora Mary Shonts, a daughter of railroad executive Theodore P. Shonts.
