= Theodore P. Shonts =

American lawyer and industrialist (1855–1919)

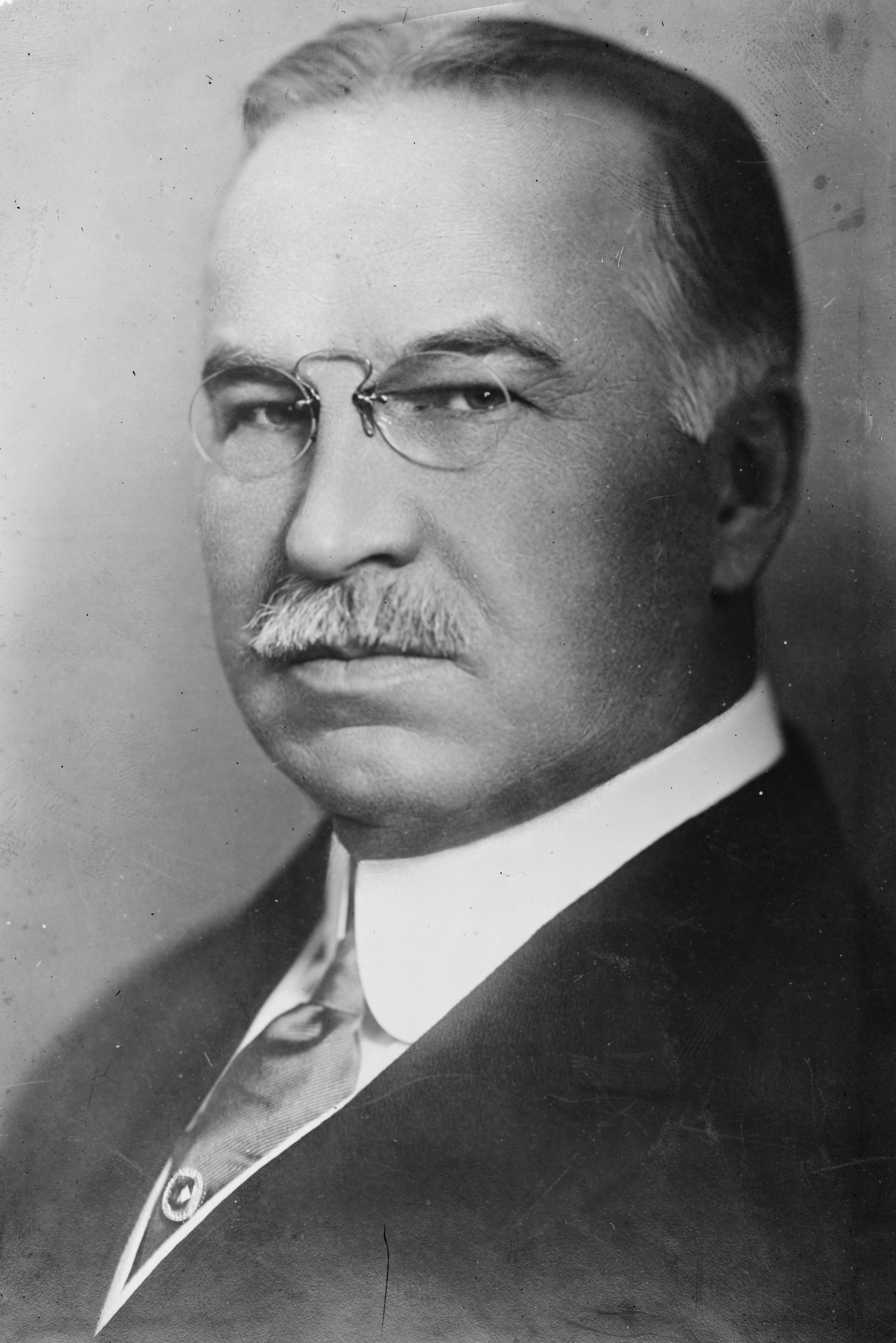
- Shonts, c. 1915–1919

President of the Interborough Rapid Transit Company
- In office March 1907 – September 1919

Personal details
- Born: Theodore Perry Shonts; May 5, 1855 Crawford County, Pennsylvania, U.S.
- Died: September 21, 1919 (aged 64) New York City, New York, U.S.
- Spouse: Harriet Amelia Drake (m. 1881)
- Relations: Father-in-law: Francis M. Drake
- Children: 2, including Theodora d'Albert, Duchess of Chaulnes
- Education: Monmouth College (1876)

Theodore Perry Shonts (May 5, 1855 – September 21, 1919) was an American lawyer and industrialist who served as chairman of the Panama Canal Commission and president of a number of important railways, including the Interborough Rapid Transit Company of New York City and the Toledo, St. Louis and Western Railroad.

== Early life ==
Shonts was born in Crawford County, Pennsylvania, on May 5, 1855. He was the son of Dr. Henry Daniels Shonts (1823–1910), and Margaret Nevin (née Marshall) Shonts (1825–1915). His maternal grandparents were H. David Marshall and Jane (née Waid) Marshall. His father was a well-known pioneer doctor who practiced in Erie, Pennsylvania, before moving to Centerville, Iowa, in 1861.

In 1876, Shonts graduated from Monmouth College in Illinois where he studied civil engineering. In 1914, he was awarded an honorary Doctor of Laws degree from Ohio Northern University in Ada, Ohio.

== Career ==
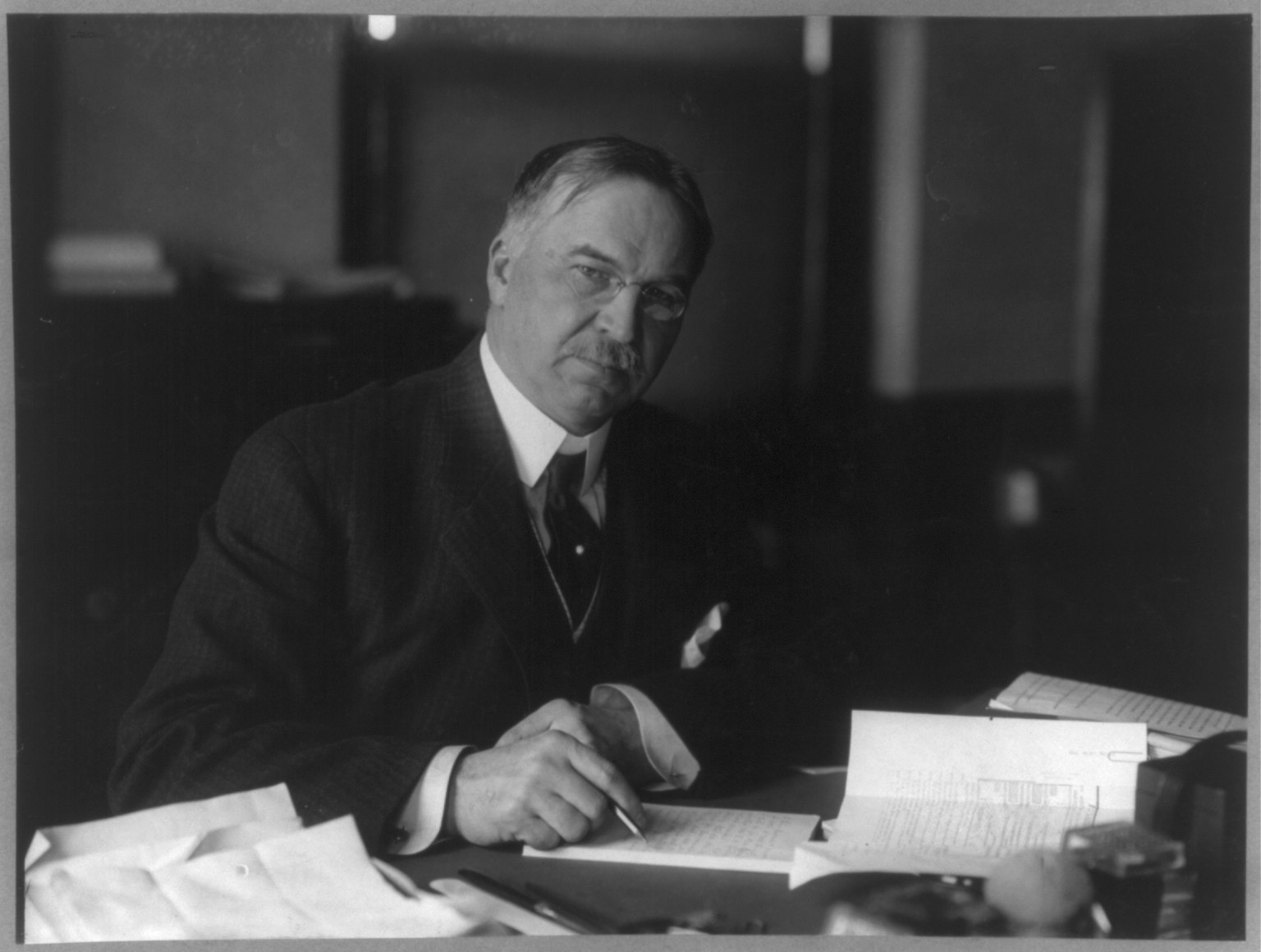
Shonts seated at his desk, 1907.

After graduation from Monmouth College, he became an accountant and was employed by national banks in Iowa to standardize and simplify methods of bookkeeping before studying law and practicing for a short time in Centerville. He became associated with General Francis Marion Drake, who had large financial and railroad interests, and who placed much of the management and construction into Shonts' hands. With associates, he secured control of the Toledo, St. Louis and Western Railroad, commonly known as the Clover Leaf Road, which he rehabilitated and made successful.

In 1905, U.S. President Theodore Roosevelt appointed Shonts chairman of the Isthmian Canal Commission, working closely with newly appointed chief engineer John Frank Stevens on the construction of the Panama Canal. Stevens was appointed to improve the work of the commission after the original chief engineer, John Findley Wallace, had resigned due to lack of support from the commission. Shonts served in this role on the commission until February 1907, when he was elected the president of the Interborough Rapid Transit Company where he assumed his duties on March 4, 1907, and served until his death in 1919.

He also served as president of the Toledo, St. Louis and Western Railroad (from 1904 to 1912), the Chicago and Alton Railroad (from 1907 to 1912), and the Iowa Central and Minneapolis and St. Louis Railway (from 1909 to 1911).

== Personal life ==
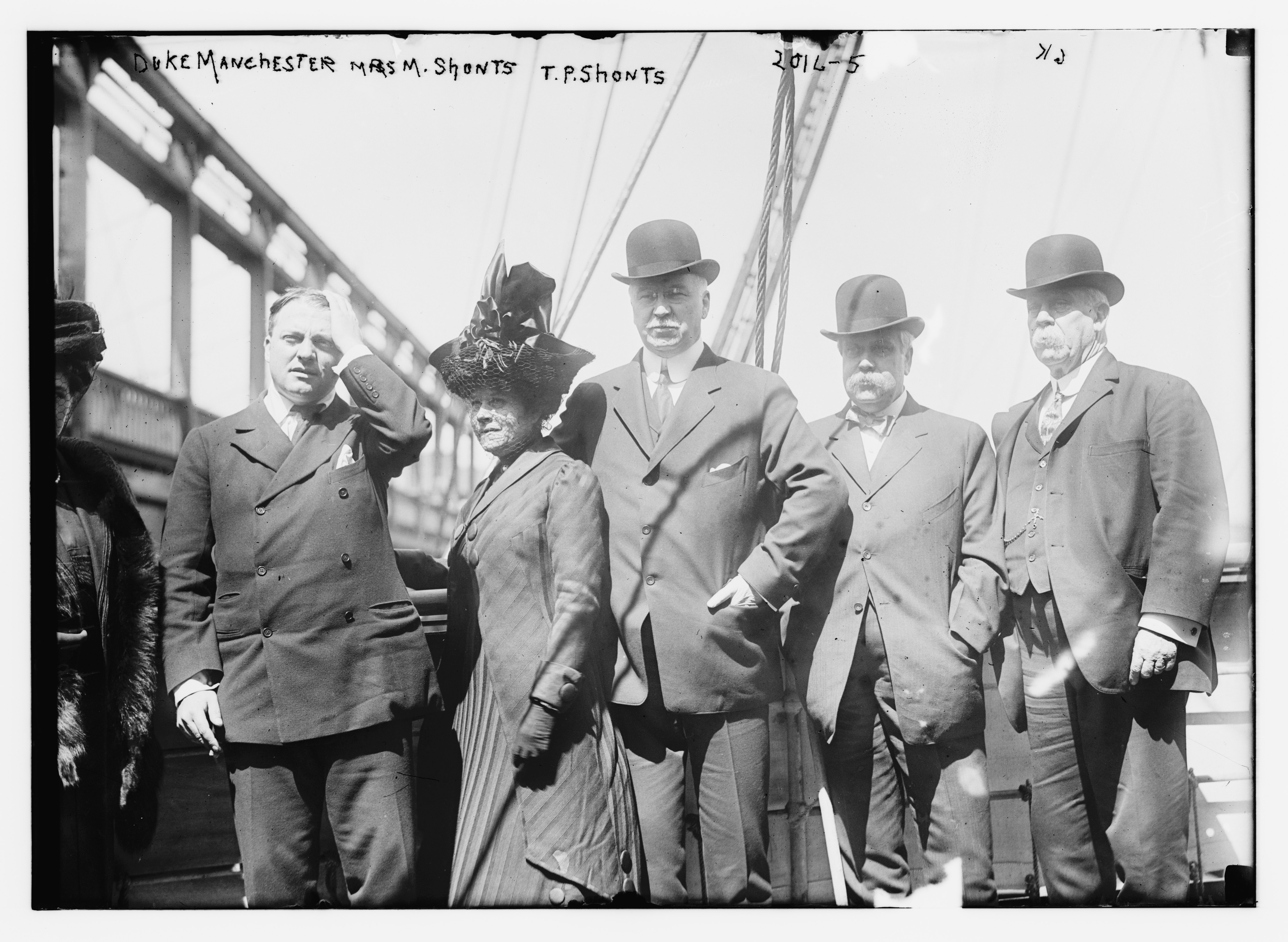
The Duke of Manchester (who married the American heiress Helena Zimmerman) with Shonts and his wife Millie, 1900.

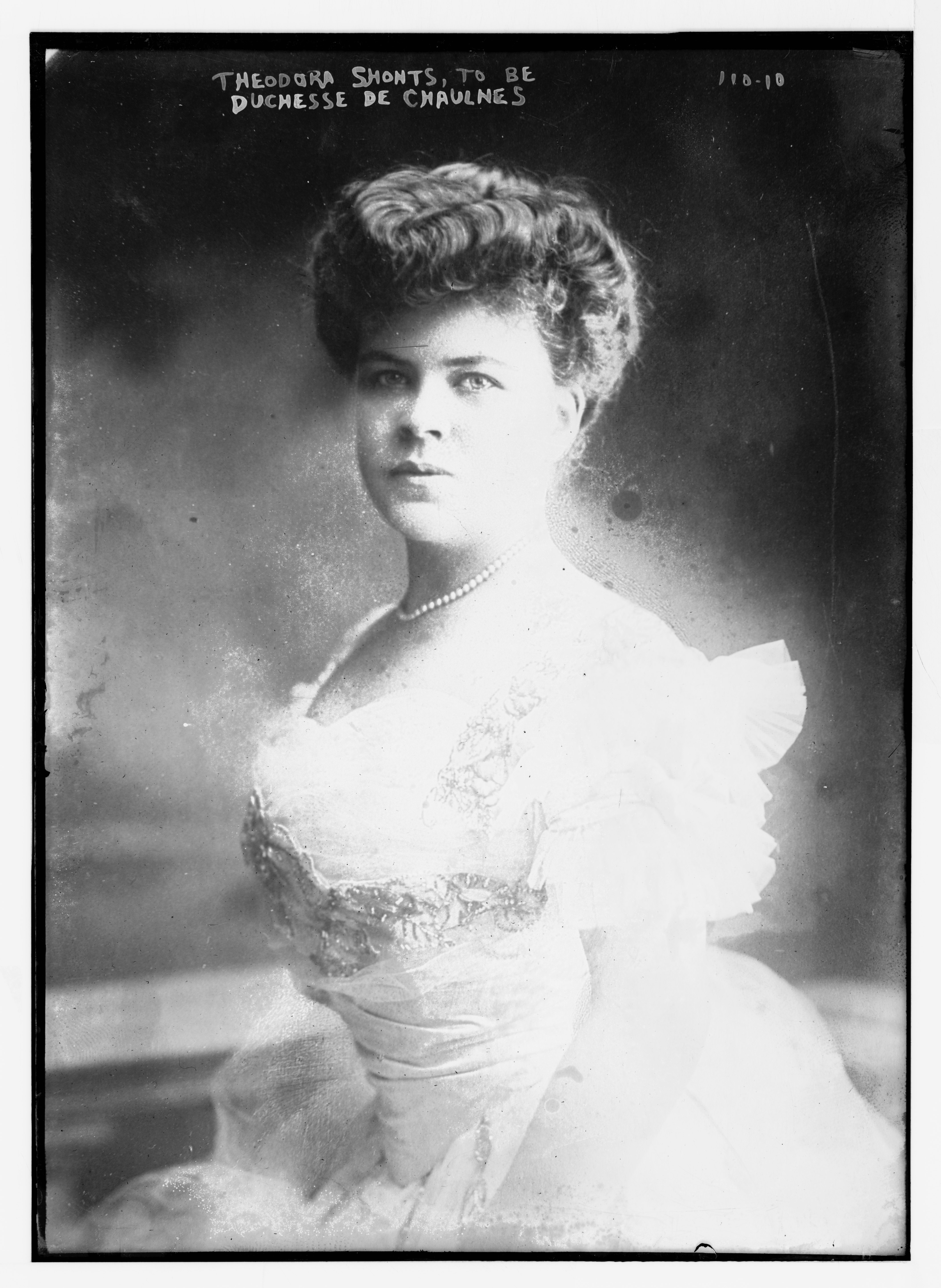
His daughter, Theodora d'Albert, Duchess of Chaulnes in 1900, before she married Emmanuel d'Albert de Luynes, Duke of Chaulnes.

In 1881, Shonts was married to Harriet Amelia "Millie" Drake (1856–1929). She was the daughter of Mary Jane (née Lord) Drake and Gen. Francis Marion Drake, the Governor of Iowa from 1896 to 1898. Shonts later served as chairman of the board of Drake University in Iowa (founded by his father-in-law in 1881). Together, they were the parents of two daughters:

- Theodora Mary Shonts (1882–1966), who married Emmanuel d'Albert de Luynes, Duke of Chaulnes and Picquigny, in 1908. He was the son of the late Sophie, Princess Galitzine and Paul d'Albert de Luynes, Duke of Chaulnes and Picquigny. His only sibling, Marie Thérèse d'Albert de Luynes, was married to Louis de Crussol d'Uzès, 14th Duke of Uzès. The Duke died less than three months after the marriage.
- Marguerite Shonts (b. 1889), who married Rutherford Bingham, the son of Gen. Theodore A. Bingham, former New York City Police Commissioner, in 1917. Bingham served in the U.S. diplomatic service.

In 1906, the family began occupying the home at 1526 New Hampshire Avenue in Washington, D.C. When Shonts moved to New York City to begin working with the Transit Company, he stayed at the Metropolitan Club while his family remained in Washington. When they visited New York City, they all stayed at the St. Regis.

After his separation, he lived at the Hotel Beresford on the Upper West Side of Manhattan, before moving to 930 Park Avenue on the Upper East Side. He also had a summer home at Long Beach, New York.

After suffering a breakdown from overwork, Shonts died on September 21, 1919, at 930 Park Avenue, his home in Manhattan, New York City. After a funeral at the Brick Presbyterian Church on Fifth Avenue, he was buried at Woodlawn Cemetery, Bronx. In his will, he left the majority of his estate not to his wife and children, but to his "friend" Mrs. Amanda Thomas, which led his wife to file a $1,000,000 suit against Mrs. Thomas "for alienation of affection". His widow who was "destitute" at the time of her death, was buried at Oakland Cemetery in Centerville, Iowa.

=== Descendants ===
Through his eldest daughter Theodora, he was a grandfather of Emmanuel Théodore Bernard Marie II d'Albert de Luynes (1908–1980), Duke of Chaulnes and Picquigny.

Through his daughter Marguerite, he was a grandfather of Theodore Rutherford Glenn Bingham (1919–1944), who was born in Cuba and was declared Missing in Action in February 1944 in Ii, Finland, aged 24, during World War II; he married Ardath Crane "Noni" Smith in 1943, a daughter of millionaire Clifford Warren Smith (who later married actress Claire Luce). Bingham's widow was murdered in 1953 while married to her eighth husband, Joe Glen Kuykendall, who was tried and acquitted for her murder.
