= Louis Joseph d'Albert, 6th Duke of Chaulnes =

French aristocrat

- Born: 1741
- Died: 1792 (aged 50–51)
- Occupations: Chemist, Aristocrat
- Parent: Michel Ferdinand d'Albert d'Ailly

Louis Joseph d'Albert, 6th Duke of Chaulnes (1741–1792), sixth Duke of Chaulnes and son of Michel Ferdinand d'Albert d'Ailly, was a chemist and French aristocrat.

== Biography ==
At the death of his father in 1769, Louis Joseph inherited the title of Duke of Picquigny. He studied science successfully and in 1764 was elected a Fellow of the Royal Society in London.

He retired from military service at the age of twenty-four with the simple rank of colonel and instead undertook the study of natural sciences. In 1775, he proved that the poisonous air produced in the brewing process was carbon dioxide, and demonstrated a method of easily preparing acidic water with instruments with which water was shaken above vats where beer was fermenting. He showed a method of extracting and purifying salts from urine. In 1773, he found a way to crystallize alkalis by saturating carbon dioxide over a vat of beer.

Chemists at the time recognised that asphyxiation from coal fumes is due to the formation of carbon dioxide. Chaulnes proposed a way to recover from suffocation through the administration of ammonia gas in various forms. After experiencing success with animals, he wanted to confirm his discoveries on human beings. He gave instructions to his valet and, when he had practised enough, he shut himself in a glass cabinet, sat on a mattress and surrounded himself with burning charcoal.

"When you see me fall", he said, "retrieve me from the cabinet and give me aid as I've taught you to do."

The valet obeyed promptly and brought his master back to life.

In the course of Chaulnes' travels he visited Egypt in 1763 where he recorded what he saw with accurate drawings of several monuments which until then had been un-published or poorly described. However, he included only one in the paper Mémoire sur la véritable entrée du monument égyptien qui se trouve à quatre lieues du Caire, près de Sakara, Paris, 1783, in-4°. That monument, known as the Well of Birds, was a tomb for sacred animals. The author recounts his fruitless attempts to make plaster casts of the superb hieroglyphs and gives other curious details. He also published Mémoire et Expériences sur l'air fixe qui se dégage de la bière en fermentation, included in vol. 9 of an anthology of foreign scholars of the Academy of Sciences, 1780.

On 11 February 1773 The Duke of Chaulnes had an altercation with Caron de Beaumarchais who accused him of stealing his mistress, the actress Mademoiselle Ménard. He was then imprisoned at the Château de Vincennes.
