= Francis M. Drake =

American politician (1830–1903)

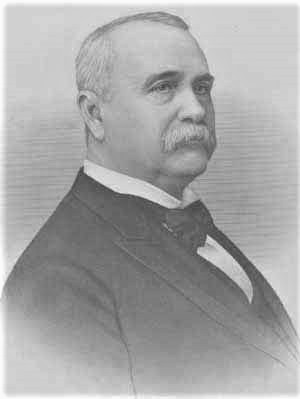

16th Governor of Iowa
- In office January 16, 1896 – January 13, 1898
- Lieutenant: Matt Parrott
- Preceded by: Frank D. Jackson
- Succeeded by: L. M. Shaw

Personal details
- Born: December 30, 1830 Rushville, Illinois, US
- Died: November 20, 1903 (aged 72) Centerville, Iowa, US
- Party: Republican
- Spouse: Mary Jane Lord (m. 1855; died 1883)
- Relations: Theodora d'Albert, Duchess of Chaulnes (granddaughter)
- Children: 7

Military service
- Branch/service: Union Army
- Years of service: April 1861- August 24, 1865
- Rank: Brigadier General
- Unit: 36th Iowa Infantry
- Battles/wars: American Civil War; Battle of Helena; Camden Expedition; Battle of Elkin's Ferry; Battle of Prairie D'Ane

Francis Marion Drake (December 30, 1830 – November 20, 1903) was an American merchant, lawyer, banker and politician. He fought in the American Civil War and later became the 16th governor of Iowa. He is the namesake of Drake University.

== Early life ==
Drake was born on December 30, 1830, in Rushville, Illinois, one of 14 children of John Adams Drake and Harriet Jane O'Neal. In 1836, his family moved to Fort Madison, Iowa until 1846. In 1846, they moved to Davis County, where John established the town of Drakesville, Iowa. He adventured to California, where he accidentally steered a steam ship into a reef in the Pacific Ocean, wrecking the steamer. In 1859, he opened a general store in Unionville, Iowa.

== Career ==
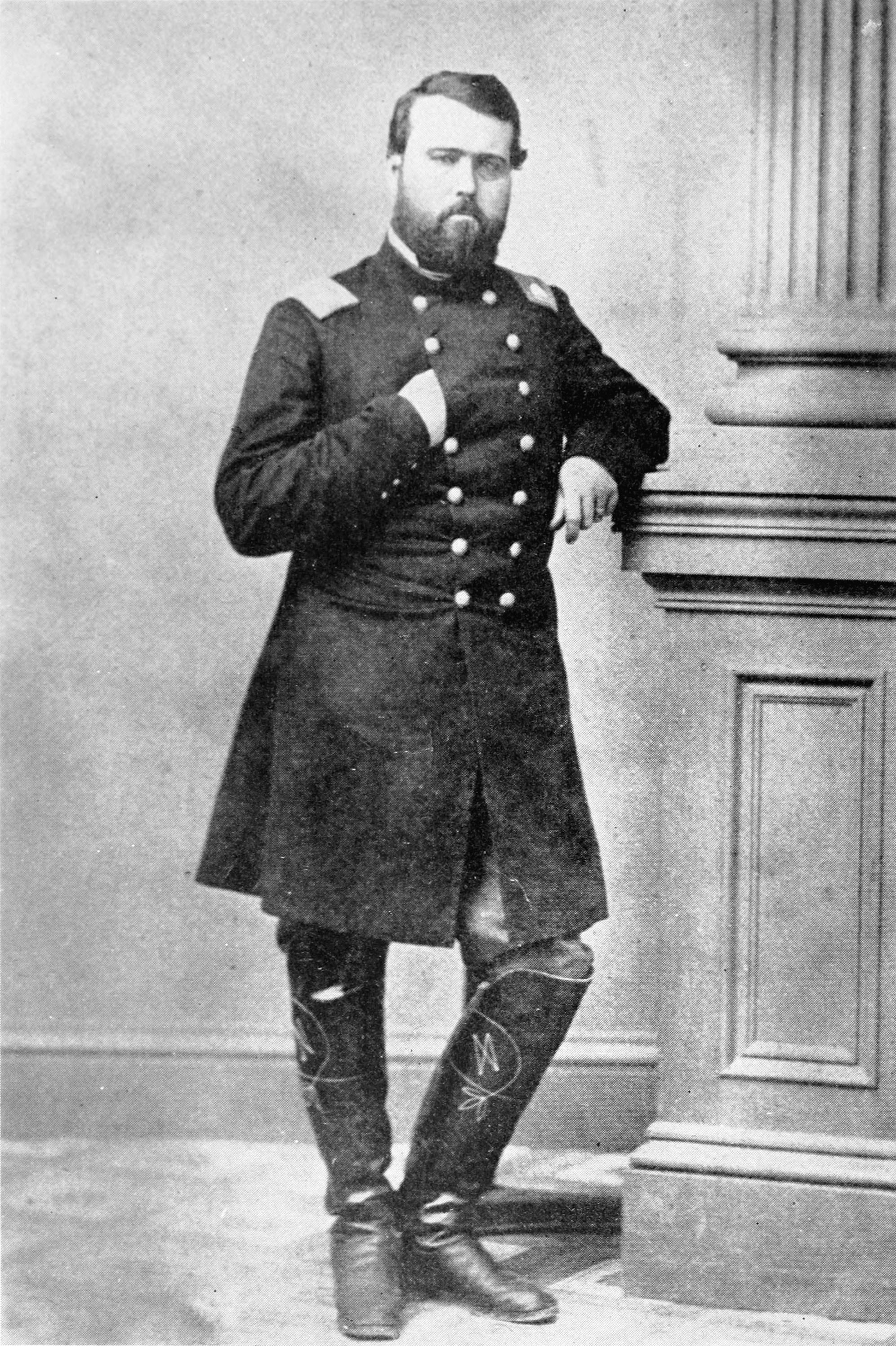
Drake as a brigadier general

During the California Gold Rush, he led two expeditions across the plains from Iowa to California. The first one left in 1852. During that trip with ox teams, he and just 7 other teamsters encountered a band of 300 Pawnee on the plains of Nebraska and he succeeded in blunting their attack with little loss-reportedly after personally slaying the Pawnee leader with a knife, demoralizing the remaining Indians, who broke contact. The second trip in 1854 escorted a herd of cattle. Returning by ship after the second trip, he was wrecked off of Point Arguello. Eight hundred passengers were killed, but Drake assisted in rescuing 200 passengers.

=== Civil War ===
After Fort Sumter, Drake obtained a Captain's commission and operated with a mounted Iowa border regiment patrolling northern Missouri and clearing out small bands of rebels. His leadership was quickly recognized and for a while he was placed in charge of a Federal depot at Hannibal Missouri. After Lincoln's July 1862 call for 300,000 more volunteers to serve for 3 years or until the end of the war, Drake was commissioned as lieutenant colonel in August 1862 of a regiment that was designated the 36th Iowa Volunteer Infantry Regiment. The 36th was mustered into United States service on October 4, 1862 at Camp Lincoln, Keokuk, Iowa. The 36th departed Keokuk for Helena, Arkansas in mid-November 1862. At Helena, the regiment was assigned to the 13th Division of the XIII Army Corps and it was on garrison duty there until February 24, 1863, when the 13th Division was ordered by Grant to conduct a raid through the Yazoo Pass into the inland waterways of the Mississippi Delta to attempt to locate a northern approach to assault Vicksburg. Here Drake saw his first combat action as Executive Officer of the 36th, which was almost constantly under artillery fire from the rebel guns at Fort Pemberton, at the confluence of the Tallahatchie and Yazoo Rivers, and during which the 36th Iowa conducted two hazardous long-range reconnaissance-in-force operations to try to locate a dry land route that would enable them to flank the rebel fort, which had been reinforced with large naval cannon. The regiment suffered 5 wounded from enemy snipers and some half-dozen others died of fevers and were buried at Shellmound, Mississippi adjacent to the Curtis Plantation on the banks of the Tallahatchie River. Shell Mound, an ancient Native American ceremonial mound, was some 1.5 miles north of the enemy fort located at a sharp bend in the river, three miles west of Greenwood, Mississippi. Lieutenant-Colonel Drake was nearly killed while leading the first reconnaissance operation when a large caliber enemy artillery shell that struck a large tree immediately in front of him and exploded. Despite efforts by Union gunboats to reduce Fort Pemberton, and with reinforcements sent by Grant, the Union forces abandoned the effort in April, and the 13th Division returned to Helena, arriving there on April 8.

On July 4, 1863, Drake was on the sick list with all of the other staff officers during the Battle of Helena. Although the staff officers were too sick to take part, the regiment—led by Captain Martin Varner (CO. A) as well as company officers and non-commissioned officers—played a key role in repulsing three dismounted enemy cavalry brigades under overall command of Major General John S. Marmaduke, and consisting of Joseph (Jo) Shelby's "Iron Brigade", a second brigade under Colonel Colton Greene and a third brigade commanded by Brigadier General Lucius "Marsh" Walker. The rebel brigades attempted to seize Battery A--one of four huge reinforced redoubts armed with heavy siege guns along the crest of Crowley's Ridge, immediately west of the town of Helena. The 36th won high praise from both their brigade commander, Brigadier General Samuel Rice and the overall Helena garrison commander, General Frederick Salomon, for their action which culminated with a final advance of 9 companies from Battery A northeastward to clear Shelby's and Greene's troops from hills beyond and re-establish the 36th Iowa's picket positions that were overrun at 3 a.m. Union casualties at Helena were relatively light compared to those of General Theophilus Holmes' rebel command which suffered some 700 killed, an equal number wounded and nearly 1,000 taken prisoner. In the first half of April 1864 during the Camden Expedition to cooperated with the forces of Major General Nathaniel Banks on the Red River, in Louisiana, Drake was directed by 2nd Brigade / Third Division / VII Army Corps commander William McLean to establish a beachhead on the south bank of the Little Missouri River to enable the rest of the VII Army Corps to cross there and bypass heavy concentrations of the enemy guarding the Military Road river crossing at Antoine, 15 miles upriver in hopes of using this alternate route to outflank the rebel army under overall command of Sterling Price and advance onto Prairie D'Ane. On the morning of April 3, Drake took three companies of the 36th Iowa (A, D, G) three companies of the 43rd Indiana, 2 dismounted companies of the 1st Iowa Cavalry and a two-gun section of the 2nd Missouri Light Artillery—less than 500 troops in all—to established an advance picket post in very dense woods in the Little Missouri bottom, a mile south of the river. Drake's small command engaged enemy scouts observing the Federals in small skirmishes throughout the day as the rebel scouts bought time awaiting reinforcement from Marmaduke. At first light on April 4, an estimated 2,500 dismounted enemy cavalry belonging to Marmaduke's division attacked Drake's forward position in the Battle of Elkin's Ferry. In a battle that lasted 7 hours, Drake's small command was steadily driven back toward the Little Missouri but he managed to stop the enemy assault, enabling the remainder of General Frederick Steele's VII Army Corps to cross the river there and advance to a showdown with Major General Sterling Price at the subsequent Battle of Prairie D'Ane, April 10–12. There Steele routed the enemy, driving them southwest to the Confederate state capital-in-exile at Washington, Arkansas.

On April 15, the Union VII Corps advanced into Camden, Arkansas largely unopposed, in search of supplies, and Drake again showed his talent when he was assigned with just 5 companies of the 36th Iowa and two artillery pieces to hold open a critical crossroads ("Camden Crossroads") ten miles west of the city for 5 hours until early evening when the Frontier Division of General John Thayer caught up with Steele's advanced column. The Union VII Corps occupied Camden from 15–26 April. Up to that time, Camden was the Headquarters of Price's Confederate Army of Arkansas. Steele found insufficient rebel food stocks there, requiring him to dispatch forage trains and send supply trains to Pine Bluff. 80 miles northeast across desolate country. On 22 April 1864 a second such supply train was organized and, with 2nd Brigade commander McLean and the colonels of the 36th Iowa, 43rd Indiana and 77th Ohio all on the sick list, command of the 2nd Brigade devolved on Lieutenant Colonel Drake, who was ordered to take the brigade as escort for a 240-wagon supply train to Pine Bluff and to return with rations and other supplies. It was considered a high-risk but essential mission, as VII Corps had exhausted its rations and the troops at Camden were surviving on raw ears of corn or cornbread—if they were lucky. Departing with the train on April 23, Drake encamped 18 miles east of the city on the first afternoon. Drake's cavalry screen skirmished with Shelby's scouts along the way. On the second afternoon, a Sunday, Drake and the wagon train camped on the west bank of the nearly impassible Moro Bayou. Getting underway again before daylight on Monday, April 25, 1864, as the first of the train emerged from the rutted and soggy trail across the Moro, Drake's command was ambushed by some 7000 dismounted rebel cavalry under the command of General James Fagan at a lonely cross-roads known as Marks Mills. In this desperate fight that ended in hand-to-hand close quarters combat, Drake led a spirited defense and was severely wounded, finally falling from his horse due to lack of blood and was captured, along with the entire brigade, save a handful who managed to escape back to Union lines.

Despite the fearsome odds, the Federals held Fagan's command at bay for fully 5 hours, before two brigades under General Jo Shelby—including his "Iron Brigade"—held in reserve for four hours—finally charged into the Union left flank, encircling the Federals and cutting them off from reinforcements that were following some 20 miles to the west. Badly wounded by a Minie ball that struck his hip and broke into three large fragments that traveled into his leg and knee, Drake awoke after the battle to find General James Fagan standing over him. Fagan ensured that Drake was personally attended to by his own surgeon and a few days later Fagan provided an ambulance to transport Drake from a makeshift field hospital to the nearby home of a southern Doctor and his wife who provided more comfortable and personalized care. Fagan also took the chivalrous step of personally paroling Drake and a few other wounded 36th Iowa officers so they could return to Union lines at Little Rock for proper medical treatment. This was despite Ulysses S. Grant's recent April 17, 1864 ban on prisoner exchanges with the Confederates. Meanwhile, some 1200 men of his brigade were captured at Marks' Mills and force-marched to the notorious prison stockade at Camp Ford, Tyler, Texas where they would remain in horrid conditions until late February 1865. Upon recovering from his wound at his home in Blakesburg, Iowa, Drake returned to Little Rock on crutches. He was appointed President of the Military Commission of Arkansas—then the most powerful military court in the state.

In December 1864, Drake, already nominated for promotion to brigadier, preferred charges against his commanding officer, Colonel Charles W. Kittredge resulting in Kittredge's Court Martial, conviction and dismissal from service for drunkenness and conduct unbecoming an officer. On the promotion list for brigadier from October 1864, Drake was appointed Brevet Brigadier General in late February 1865. He meanwhile joined the 36th Iowa on outpost duty at St. Charles, on the White River from March until August, 1865. Meanwhile, the prisoners captured at Marks Mills who survived the horrors of Camp Ford were paroled in late February, and after 30 days home leave, reunited with the rest of the regiment (just 238 officers and men organized into three mixed companies) at St. Charles. The war in the east was winding down but Confederates in Arkansas and Texas refused to consider surrender and both Confederate military and civil authority in southern Arkansas descended into complete anarchy as many former regular Confederate officers transformed their units into raiding guerrilla bands, bushwhackers and freebooters, hitting Federal outposts on the White and Arkansas Rivers. Despite the reunification of the 36th Iowa, by late April morale was low as the troops at St. Charles waited at the remote outpost to be discharged. Upon Drake's arrival to assume command he enforced discipline and ordered the regiment to begin constructing log barracks for a proper garrison. While this angered many of the regiments veterans the activity kept them occupied and in physical shape, while they awaited word of their discharge. On June 11, 1865 - Drake assumed command of the 1st Brigade, 2nd Division, 7th Army Corps. He was finally mustered out of service in August 1865 as a U.S. Army Brigadier General, U.S. Volunteers; his old 36th Iowa Infantry Regiment - which was now part of his new command - was mustered out of Federal service on August 24, 1865 at DeValls Bluff, Arkansas, transported to Davenport Iowa, and discharged from state service.

=== Later life ===
After the war, Drake practiced law for about six years as a criminal lawyer. Then for almost 30 years, he worked at banking and building and managing railroads. He was president of the Missouri, Iowa and Nebraska Railroad, the Indiana, Illinois and Iowa Railroad and the Albia and Centerville Railroad. He organized the Centerville National Bank, of which he was president until his death.

On July 17, 1895, he was nominated by the Republican Party for governor of Iowa. He was elected governor by an overwhelming majority on November 5, 1895, serving 1896 through 1898. During his tenure, he expanded the railroads and highways. He declined to run again due to poor health.

== Personal life ==
On December 24, 1855, Drake married Mary Jane Lord, of Ohio, a native of New Brunswick, Canada. She was "a woman of superior intelligence, a leader in society and in the church. Her character for sincerity was especially marked, as were also her kindness and liberality, and she was loved and admired by her associates." Together, they had seven children, including:

- Harriet Amelia "Millie" Drake (1856–1929), who married Theodore P. Shonts, a lawyer who served as chairman of the Panama Canal Commission and president of the Interborough Rapid Transit Company and the Toledo, St. Louis and Western Railroad, in 1881.
- Jennie Drake (1858–1934), who married Dr. John Lazelle Sawyers in 1883.
- Eva J. Drake (1860–1933), who married boot and shoe merchant Henry Goss in 1881.
- Francis Ellsworth "Frank" Drake (1862–1913), who became president of the Centerville Coal Company; he married Flora Bissett.
- John Adams Drake (1866–1947), who was secretary and treasurer of the Indiana, Illinois and Iowa Railroad; he married Dula Heisel Rae, a daughter of Robert Rae.
- George Hamilton Drake (1868–1870), who died young.
- Mary Lora Drake (1873–1949), who married George Wood Sturdivant in 1896.

His wife died in Centerville on June 22, 1883. Drake died on November 20, 1903, aged 72, also in Centerville.

=== Descendants ===
Through his daughter Millie, he was a grandfather of Theodora Mary Shonts, who married French Duke Emmanuel d'Albert de Luynes.

=== Legacy ===
He founded and endowed Drake University in Des Moines, Iowa. It was named after him, and he served as president of the board of trustees. He also contributed to Iowa College and Wesleyan College and gave to churches and missionary societies of many creeds. He died in Centerville, Iowa, in 1903 of diabetes, and is buried in Centerville's Oakland Cemetery.

== Notes ==
Party political offices
Preceded by Frank D. Jackson	Republican nominee Governor of Iowa; 1895	Succeeded by L. M. Shaw
Political offices
Preceded by Frank D. Jackson	Governor of Iowa; January 16, 1896 – January 13, 1898	Succeeded by Leslie M. Shaw
