= Paul d'Albert =

Paul d'Albert may refer to:

- Paul d'Albert, 10th Duke of Chaulnes (1852–1881), French aristocrat, soldier and writer
- Paul d'Albert, Cardinal de Luynes (1703–1788), French prelate
