= Theodora d'Albert, Duchess of Chaulnes =

American heiress who married into the French nobility

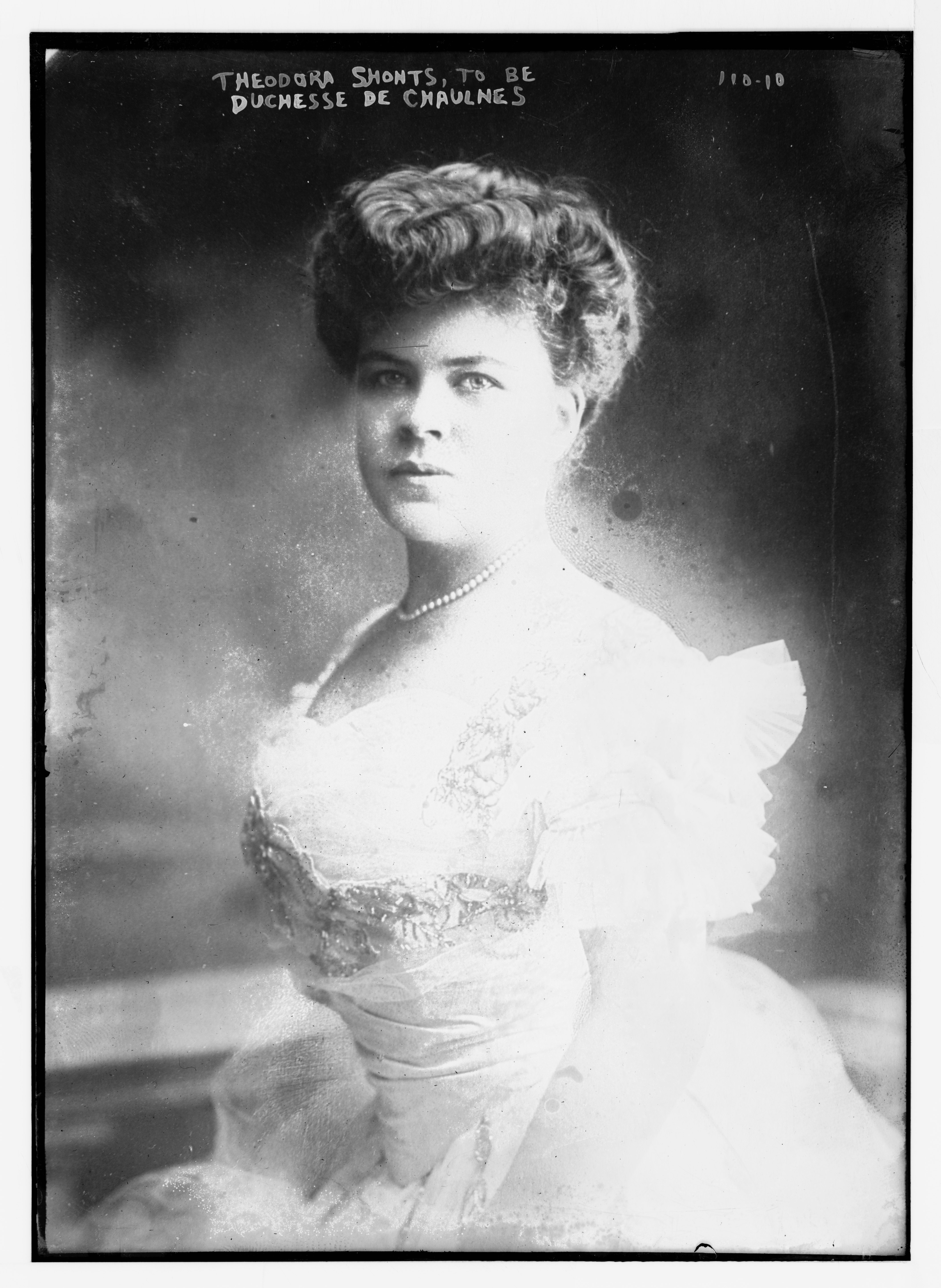
Photograph of Theodora (before her marriage), 1900.

Theodora Mary d'Albert, Duchess of Chaulnes (née Theodora Mary Shonts; March 21, 1882 – 19 October 1966) was an American heiress who married into the French nobility.

== Early life ==
Theodora was born in Washington, D.C., on March 21, 1882. Theodora was the eldest child of Harriet Amelia (née Drake) Shonts and Theodore P. Shonts. Her father was a prominent lawyer who served as President of the Interborough Rapid Transit Company. Her younger sister, Marguerite Shonts, married diplomat Rutherford Bingham (son of New York City Police Commissioner Theodore A. Bingham).

Her maternal grandparents were Mary Jane (née Lord) Drake and Gen. Francis Marion Drake, the Governor of Iowa from 1896 to 1898. Her paternal grandparents were Margaret Nevin (née Marshall) Shonts and Dr. Henry Daniels Shonts, a well known pioneer doctor who practiced in Erie, Pennsylvania before moving to Centerville, Iowa in 1861.

== Society life ==
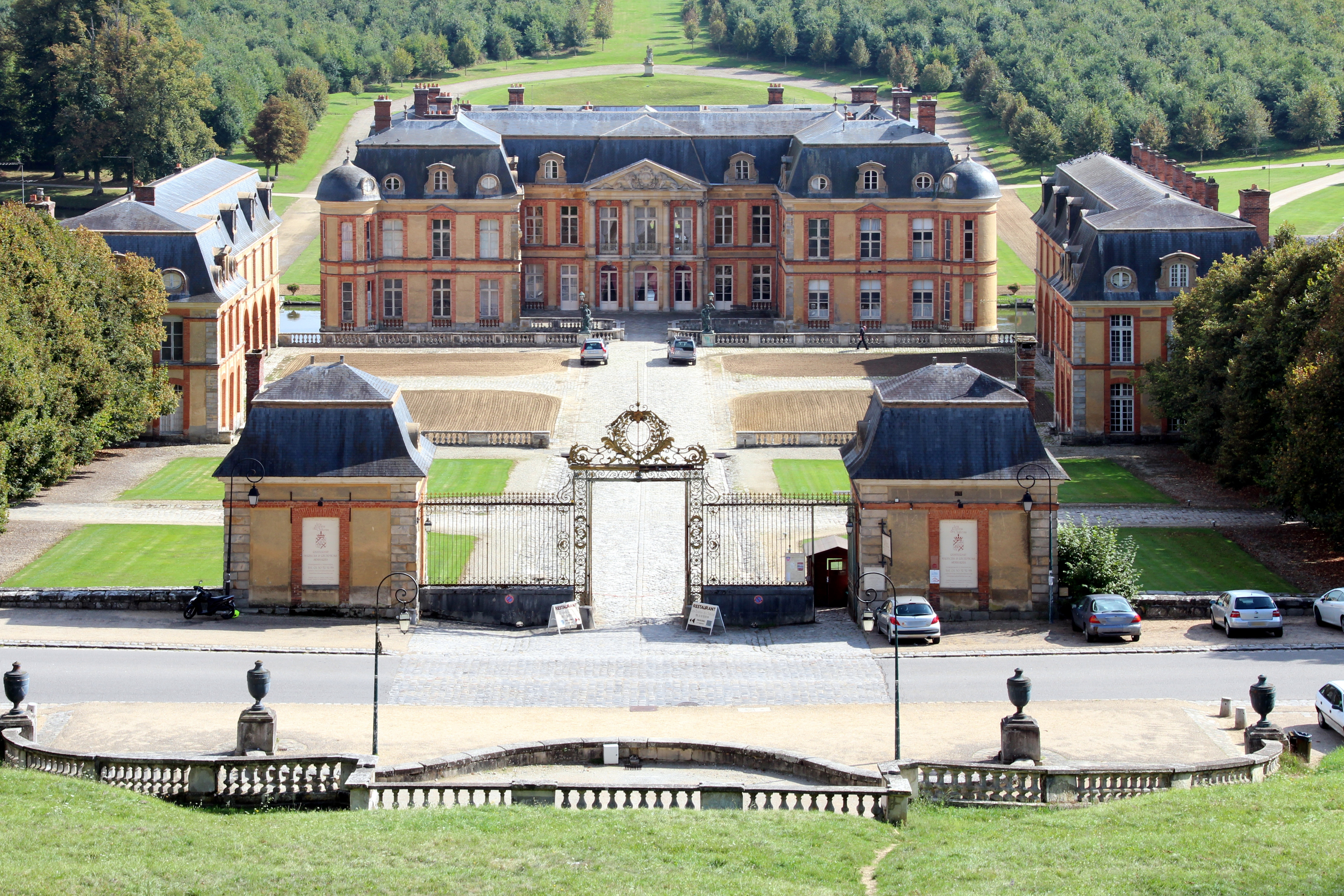
The Château de Dampierre

Beginning in 1906, her family resided at 1526 New Hampshire Avenue in Washington. After her marriage, they moved to Paris and she made her first appearance at the Paris Opera House on 11 April 1908 accompanied by the Duke's sister, the Duchess d'Uzès. Theodora "was wearing her magnificent ruby ornaments presented by her father."

=== Widowhood ===
Following her husband's death, she spent the beginning of her widowhood at his family's estate, Château de Dampierre. Upon the birth of her son, President Theodore Roosevelt wrote to Theodora and her father offering his congratulations. In 1911, she rented a villa in Cape May, New Jersey, known as Star Villa, with her mother and sister.

She often traveled back and forth from Europe and vacationed in Hot Springs, Virginia, socializing with the Duchess of Manchester, a fellow American who married into the European aristocracy. In 1915, she played a foursome of golf there with the Duchess of Manchester, her sister Marguerite and Isabella May of Washington.

Known for her fashion sense, she was "one of the first to include 'metropolitan' prints in her wardrobe. She has selected the Paris print with the Mona Lisa, the Madeleine and the Eiffel Tower. She is having it made up in her favorite color combination of black and white." She was supported, financially, in her later years by her friend, "Mrs. William Boyce Thompson, wealthy mother of Mrs. Tony Drexel Biddle Jr."

== Personal life ==
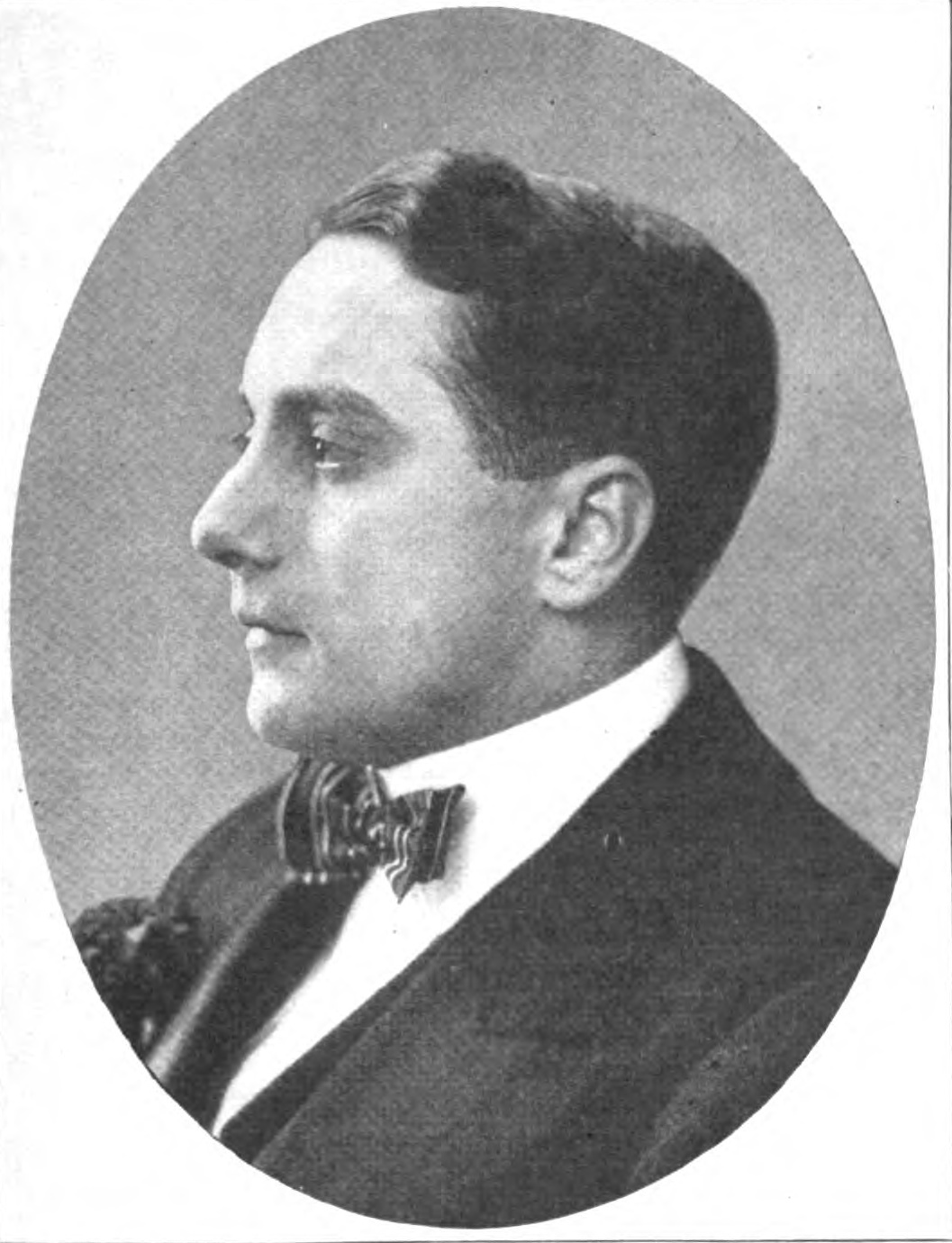
Photograph of her husband, Emmanuel d'Albert de Luynes, 1908

On February 15, 1908, Theodora married Emmanuel d'Albert de Luynes, Duke of Chaulnes and Picquigny at 132 East 35th Street, her father's home in New York City. He was the son of the late Princess Sophie Galitzine and Paul d'Albert de Luynes, Duke of Chaulnes and Picquigny (who both died young). His only sibling, Marie Thérèse d'Albert de Luynes, was married to Louis de Crussol d'Uzès, 14th Duke of Uzès. The Duke was "good looking, amiable, well educated, and possessed of charming manners." He had a house in the 8th arrondissement of Paris (in Avenue Van-Dyck in the Parc Monceau quarter) and a château in the French department of Sarthe, but was cash poor. The Duke died from heart failure (reportedly due in part to an addiction to morphine pills) on 24 April 1908, less than three months after their marriage, in his apartment in the Hotel Langham in the Rue du Boccador in Paris. Later that same year, Theodora gave birth to their only child:

- Emmanuel Théodore Bernard Marie II d'Albert de Luynes (1908–1980), Duke of Chaulnes and Picquigny.

She never remarried, but was reportedly wooed by poet Andre de Fouquières all through the Deauville season in 1913.

The Duke was interred at Château de Dampierre (from which French thieves stole Rubens and Raphael paintings in 1952). She lived another fifty-eight years until her death on 19 October 1966.
