= Emmanuel d'Albert, 11th Duke of Chaulnes =

French nobleman (1878–1908)

Emmanuel d'Albert
- 11th Duke of Chaulnes
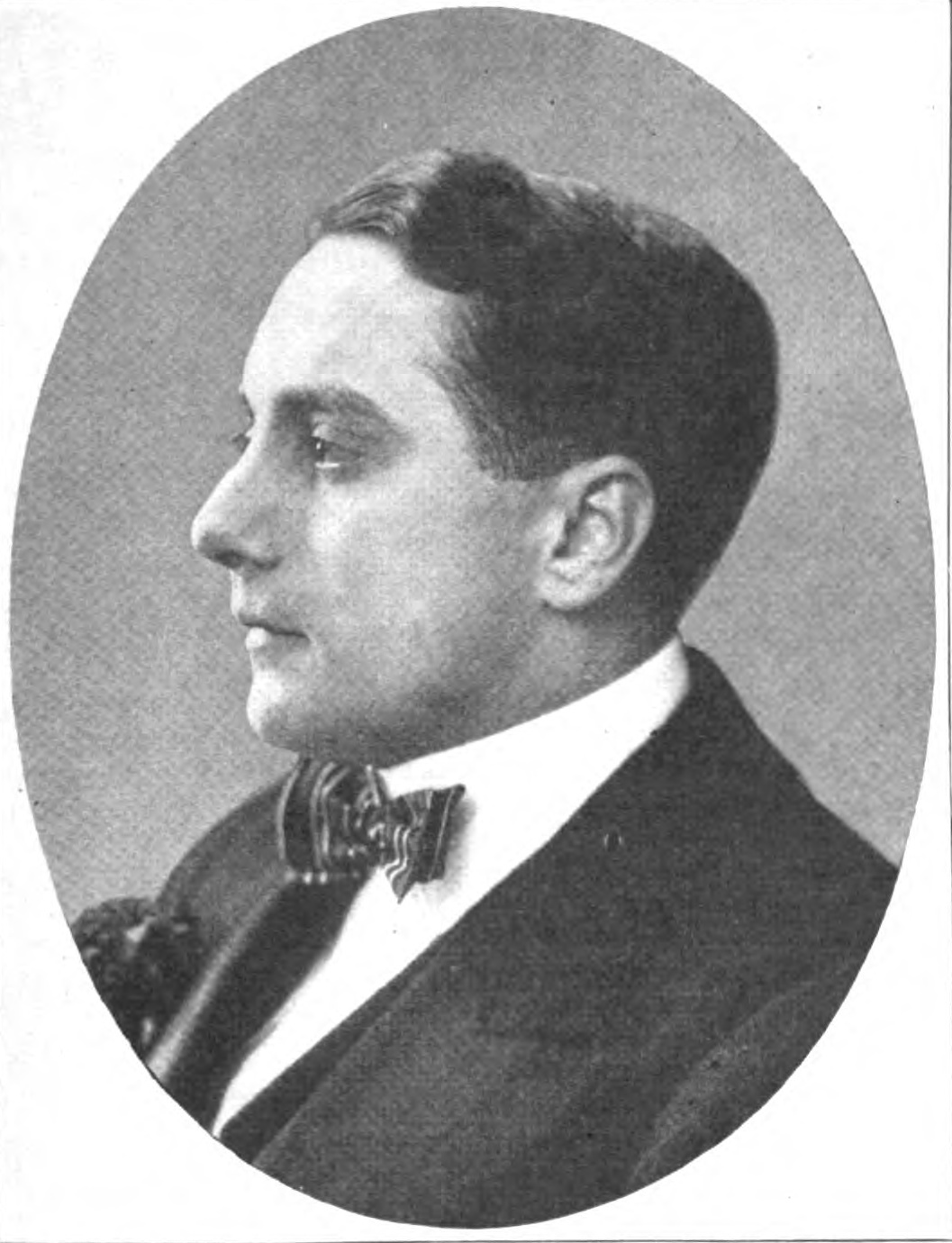
- Full name: Emmanuel Théodore Bernard Marie d'Albert
- Other titles: Duke of Picquigny, Marquis of Dangeau
- Born: 10 April 1878; Paris, France
- Died: 24 April 1908 (aged 30); Paris, France
- Spouse: Theodora Mary Shonts (m. 1908)
- Issue: Emmanuel d'Albert
- Father: Paul d'Albert, 10th Duke of Chaulnes
- Mother: Princess Sophie Galitzine

Emmanuel d'Albert, 11th Duke of Chaulnes (Emmanuel Théodore Bernard Marie; 10 April 1878 – 24 April 1908) was a French nobleman.

== Early life ==
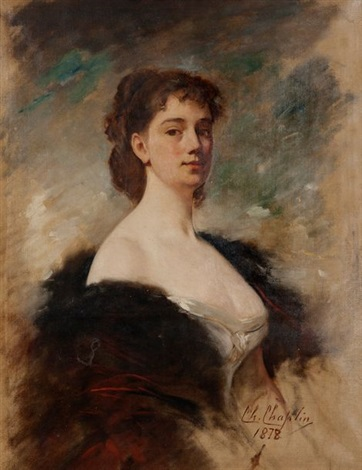
Portrait of his mother, Princess Sophie Galitzine, by Charles Joshua Chaplin, 1878

Born in Paris on 10 April 1878. He was the eldest son of Princess Sophie Galitzine (1858–1883), and Paul d'Albert, 10th Duke of Chaulnes and Picquigny (1852–1881), who both died young. His sister, Marie Thérèse d'Albert de Luynes, was married in 1894 to Louis de Crussol d'Uzès, 14th Duke of Uzès (a son of the 12th Duke of Uzès and Anne de Rochechouart de Mortemart). (Note: Simone Louise Laure de Crussol (1870–1946), the elder sister of his brother-in-law Louis de Crussol d'Uzès, 14th Duke of Uzès, was married to his cousin, Honoré d'Albert, 10th Duke of Luynes (1868–1924) (both were grandsons of Honoré-Louis d'Albert de Luynes, Duke of Chevreuse (1823–1854)) and were parents of Philippe d'Albert de Luynes, 11th Duke of Luynes.) After the early death of both of his parents, Emmanuel and his sister were brought up in the home of their aunt, Yolande the dowager Duchess of Luynes.

His father became the Duke of Chaulnes, because his father (Emmanuel's grandfather), Honoré-Louis d'Albert de Luynes, Duke of Chevreuse, predeceased his grandfather (Emmanuel's great-grandfather), Honoré Théodoric d'Albert de Luynes, 8th Duke of Luynes, of Chevreuse and of Chaulnes. His aunt, Marie Julie d'Albert de Luynes, was the wife of Elzéar de Sabran-Pontevès, 3rd Duke of Sabran, and his uncle was Charles Honoré Emmanuel d'Albert de Luynes, 9th Duke of Luynes (husband of Yolande de La Rochefoucauld). (Note: His aunt, Yolande de La Rochefoucauld (1849–1905), was a daughter of Sosthène II de La Rochefoucauld, 4th Duke of Doudeauville and Princess Yolande, a daughter of Prince Jules de Polignac, the 7th Prime Minister of France.) His maternal grandparents were Augustin Petrovitch, Prince Galitzine (son of Prince Pyotr Alexeyevich Golitsyn) and Stéphanie Marie Bernadette Louise de la Roche Aymon (a daughter of Antoine de La Roche-Aymon, Marquis de La Roche-Aymon and Marie Louise Vallet de Villeneuve), who owned the Château de Châtain in Arfeuille-Châtain.

== Career ==
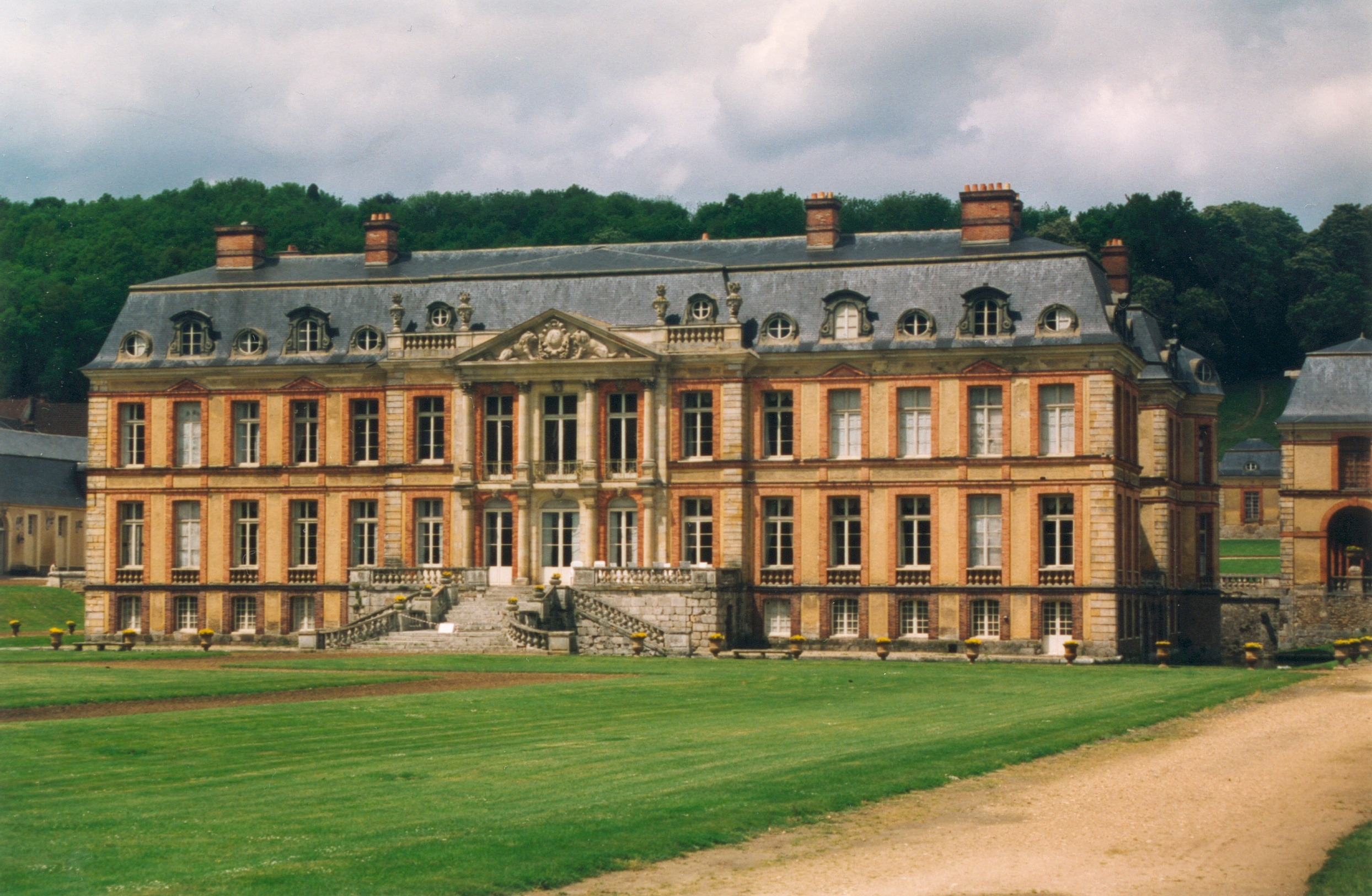
Château de Dampierre

Upon his father's early death in 1881, three year old Emmanuel became the Duke of Chaulnes and Picquigny. (Note: The barony of Picquigny came into the Albert family upon the 1620 marriage of Honoré d'Albert and Charlotte Eugénie d'Ailly, who was heir to a family holding the titles of Count of Chaulnes (created in December 1563), Vidame d'Amiens and Baron de Picquigny.) He also used the courtesy title of Marquis of Dangeau. (Note: The marquisate of Dangeau came into the Albert family in 1720 through the 1694 marriage of Marie Anne Jeanne de Courcillon (the eldest daughter of Philippe de Courcillon de Dangeau) and Honoré Charles d'Albert de Luynes, elder brother of Louis Auguste d'Albert d'Ailly, 4th Duke of Chaulnes.)

The Duke was "a familiar figure in sporting circles" and was "well known for his interest in athletics and all forms or outdoor diversion." He was a member of the Cercle de la Rue Royale (a venue for idling, smoking cigars, discussing politics and the stock market), Cercle Hoche, and of the Société Sportive de l'Ile de Puteaux.

== Personal life ==
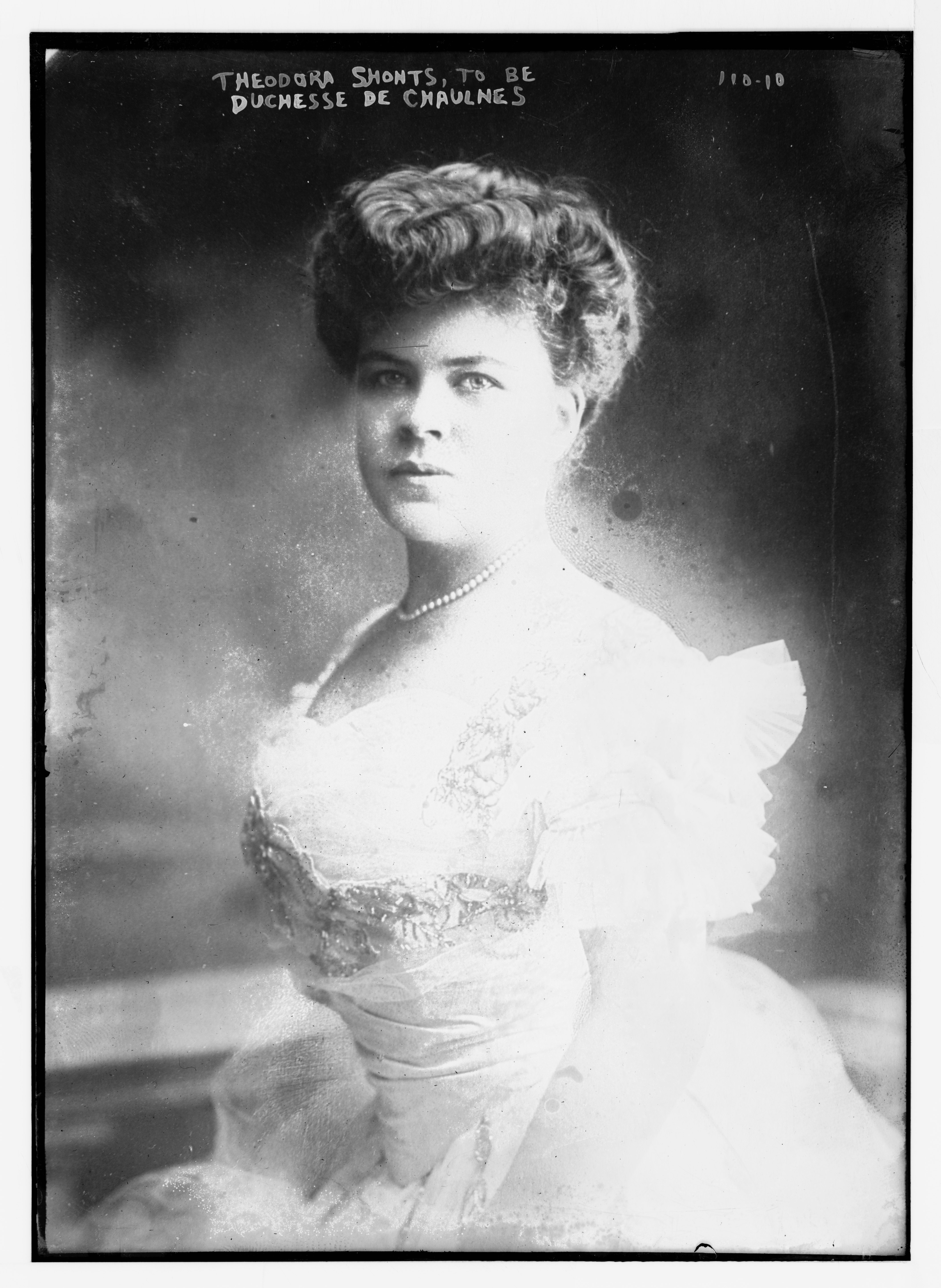
His wife, Theodora d'Albert, Duchess of Chaulnes (née Shonts) in 1900, before she married the Duke.

According to a 1907 profile in The New York Times, the Duke of Chaulnes was "good looking, amiable, well educated, and possessed of charming manners." He had a house in the 8th arrondissement of Paris (in Avenue Van-Dyck in the Parc Monceau quarter) and a hereditary château in the French department of Sarthe, but his income was small and it was reportedly well known in Paris that "for years he has been seeking a rich, American wife."

In 1902, his engagement was announced to American heiress Ena Gebhard, a daughter of prominent merchant William H. Gebhard. She had been living in Paris for a number of years. Ena was a cousin of Frederick Gebhard and Isabelle Gebhard Neilson (mother of Cathleen Gebhard Neilson, wife of Reginald Claypoole Vanderbilt). The engagement was broken off before they married however.

In 1906, another engagement to an American heiress was announced, this time to Theodora Mary Shonts (1882–1966) of New York City. She was the youngest daughter of Theodore Perry Shonts, the President of the Panama Canal Commission who was then living at 1526 New Hampshire Avenue in Washington, D.C. (Note: Theodora's younger sister, Marguerite Shonts, later married Rutherford Bingham, the son of Gen. Theodore A. Bingham, former New York City Police Commissioner, in 1917.) They married on 16 February 1908 at 132 East 35th Street, the home of the bride's father in New York City. Less than three months after they married, the Duke died. Theodora gave birth to their son in November of the same year:

- Emmanuel Théodore Bernard Marie d'Albert, 12th Duke of Chaulnes (born posthumously 1908–1980)

Tragically, like his grandfather and father before him, the Duke of Chaulnes died young with all three men dying at or around thirty years old. Emmanuel died from heart failure (reportedly due in part to an addiction to morphine pills), in the arms of his wife, on 24 April 1908 in his apartment in the Hotel Langham in the Rue du Boccador in Paris. The Duke was interred at his family's estate, Château de Dampierre, where Theodora spent the beginning of her widowhood. His widow lived another fifty-eight years until her death on 19 October 1966.
