= 1895 Iowa gubernatorial election =

- November 5, 1895
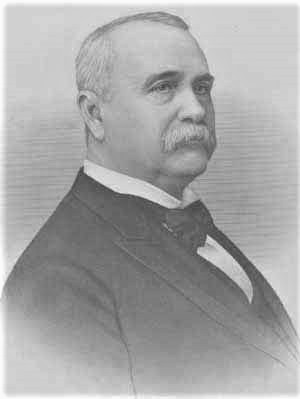

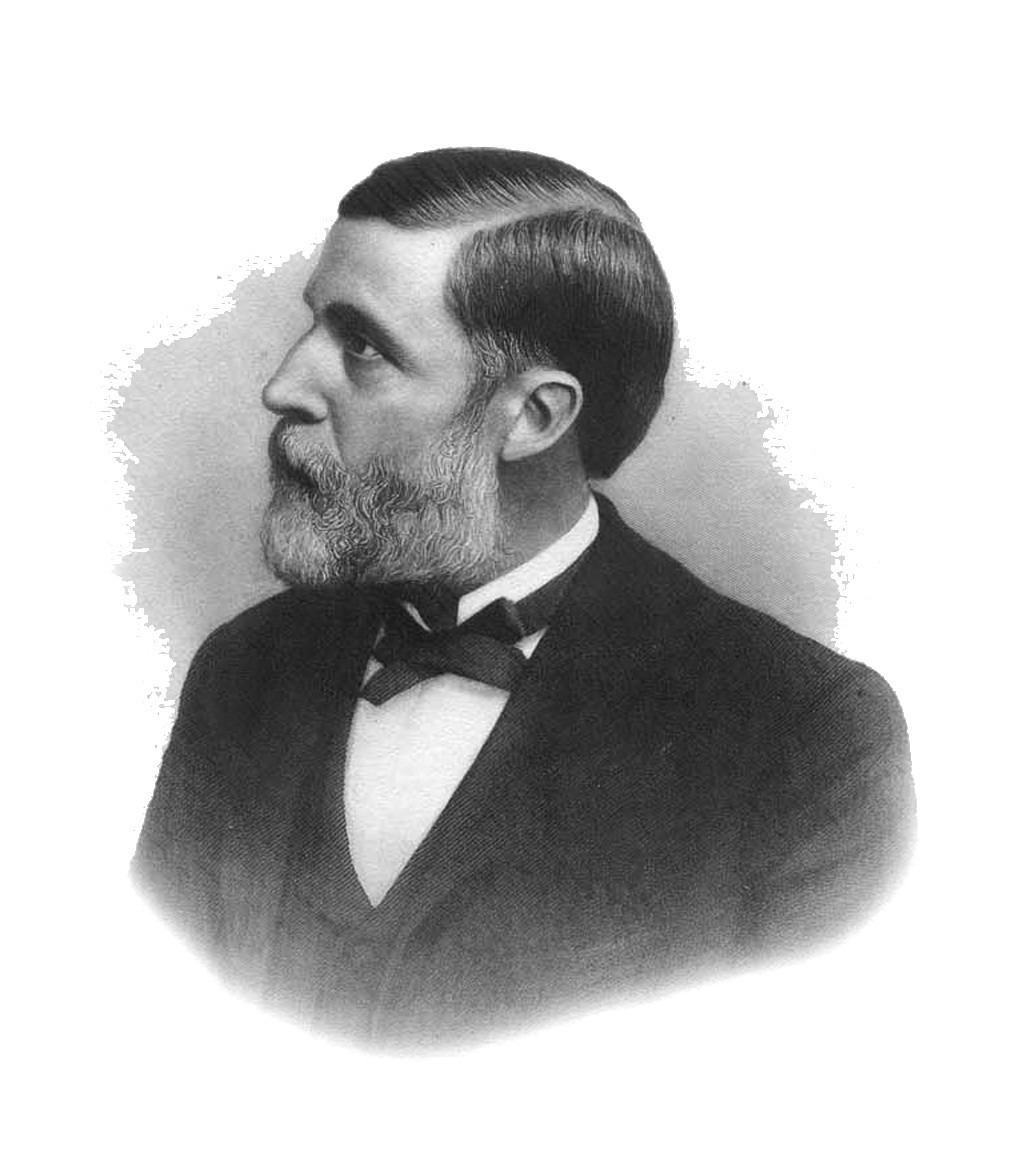

Nominee	Francis M. Drake	Washington I. Babb	Sylvanus B. Crane, Jr.
Party	Republican	Democratic	Populist
Popular vote	208,708	149,428	32,189
Percentage	52.00%	37.23%	8.02%
- County results Drake: 40–50% 50–60% 60–70% 70–80% Babb: 40–50% 50–60% 60–70% Crane: 40–50%
Governor before election
Frank D. Jackson
Republican
Elected Governor
Francis M. Drake
Republican

The 1895 Iowa gubernatorial election was held on November 5, 1895. Republican nominee Francis M. Drake defeated Democratic nominee Washington I. Babb with 52.00% of the vote.

== General election ==
=== Candidates ===
Major party candidates

- Francis M. Drake, Republican
- Washington I. Babb, Democratic

Other candidates

- Sylvanus B. Crane, Jr., People's
- Francis Bacon, Prohibition

=== Results ===
1895 Iowa gubernatorial election
Party	Candidate	Votes	%	±%
Republican	Francis M. Drake	208,708	52.00%	
Democratic	Washington I. Babb	149,428	37.23%	
Populist	Sylvanus B. Crane, Jr.	32,189	8.02%	
Prohibition	Francis Bacon	11,014	2.74%	
Majority		59,280		
Turnout				
Republican hold		Swing	+2.26%	
