= Paul d'Albert, 10th Duke of Chaulnes =

French aristocrat, soldier and writer

The Duke of Chaulnes and Picquigny
- Born: Paul Marie Stanislas Honoré d'Albert de Luynes; 16 February 1852
- Died: 26 September 1881 (aged 29); Château de Sablé, Sablé-sur-Sarthe
- Title: Duke of Chaulnes; Duke of Picquigny; Count of Chevreuse
- Spouse: Princess Sophie Golitsyn (m. 1875; died 1881)
- Children: Marie Thérèse, Duchess d'Uzès; Emmanuel d'Albert de Luynes
- Parent(s): Honoré-Louis d'Albert de Luynes; Valentine-Julie de Contades
- Relatives: Charles Honoré Emmanuel d'Albert de Luynes (brother); Honoré Théodoric d'Albert de Luynes (grandfather)

Paul Marie Stanislas Honoré d'Albert de Luynes, 10th Duke of Chaulnes and Picquigny (16 February 1852 – 26 September 1881) was a French aristocrat, soldier and writer.

== Early life ==
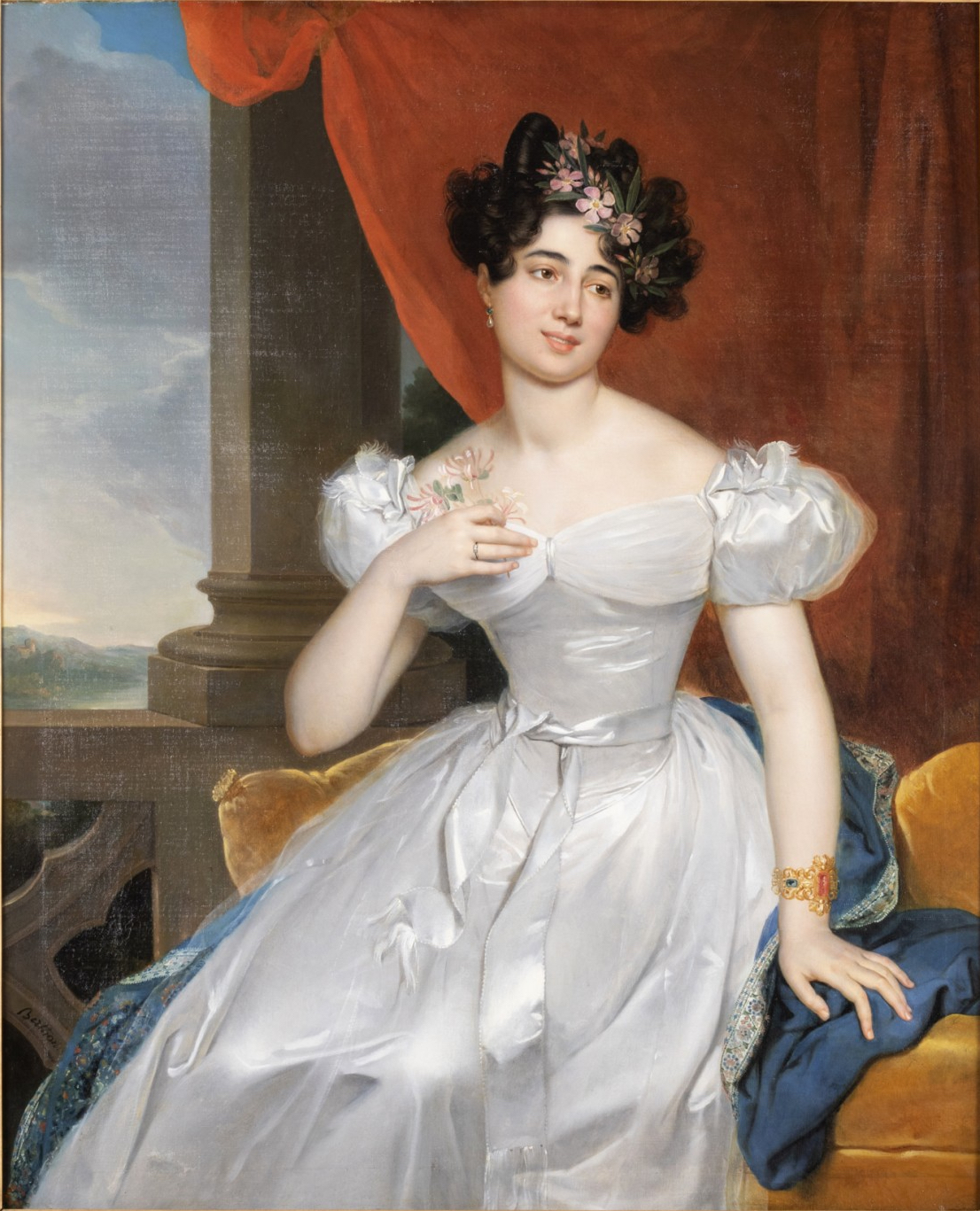
Portrait of his mother, Valentine de Contades, by René Théodore Berthon

Paul Marie Stanislas Honoré was born on 16 February 1852. He was the eldest son of Honoré-Louis d'Albert de Luynes, styled Duke of Chevreuse (1823–1854), and Valentine-Julie de Contades (1824–1900). His sister was Marie Julie d'Albert de Luynes (wife of Elzéar Charles Antoine de Sabran-Pontevès, 3rd Duke of Sabran) and his elder brother was Charles Honoré Emmanuel d'Albert de Luynes, 9th Duke of Luynes (husband of Yolande de La Rochefoucauld), (Note: His sister-in-law, Yolande de La Rochefoucauld (1849–1905), was a daughter of Sosthène II de La Rochefoucauld, 4th Duke of Doudeauville and Princess Yolande de Polignac, a daughter of Prince Jules de Polignac, the 7th Prime Minister of France.) a member of the Papal Zouaves, (Note: The Papal Zouaves was an infantry battalion, later regiment, dedicated to defending the Papal States. Named after the French zouave regiments, the Zuavi Pontifici were mainly Catholic young men who volunteered to assist Pope Pius IX in his struggle against the Italian unificationist Risorgimento.) who was killed in the Battle of Loigny–Poupry in 1870.

His father was the only child of Marie Françoise Dauvet de Maineville and Honoré Théodoric d'Albert de Luynes, 8th Duke of Luynes, a prominent writer on archaeology who is most remembered for the collection of exhibits he gave to the Cabinet des Médailles, and for supporting the exiled Comte de Chambord's claim to the throne of France. His maternal grandparents were French cavalry officer Jules Gaspard Amour de Contades, Viscount de Contades (son of François-Jules de Contades) and Gabrielle Adèle Alexandrine Amys du Ponceau.

== Career ==
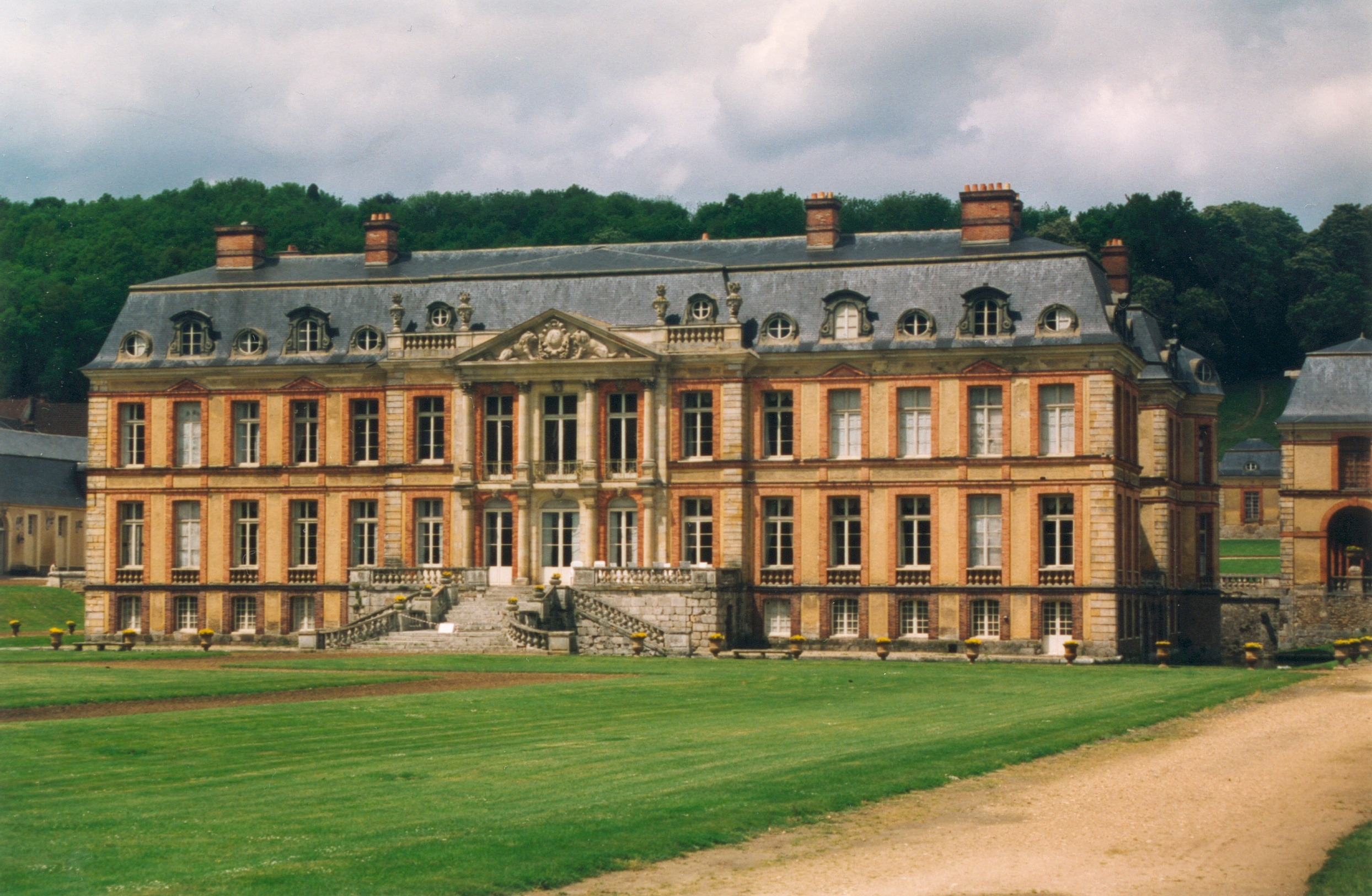
Château de Dampierre

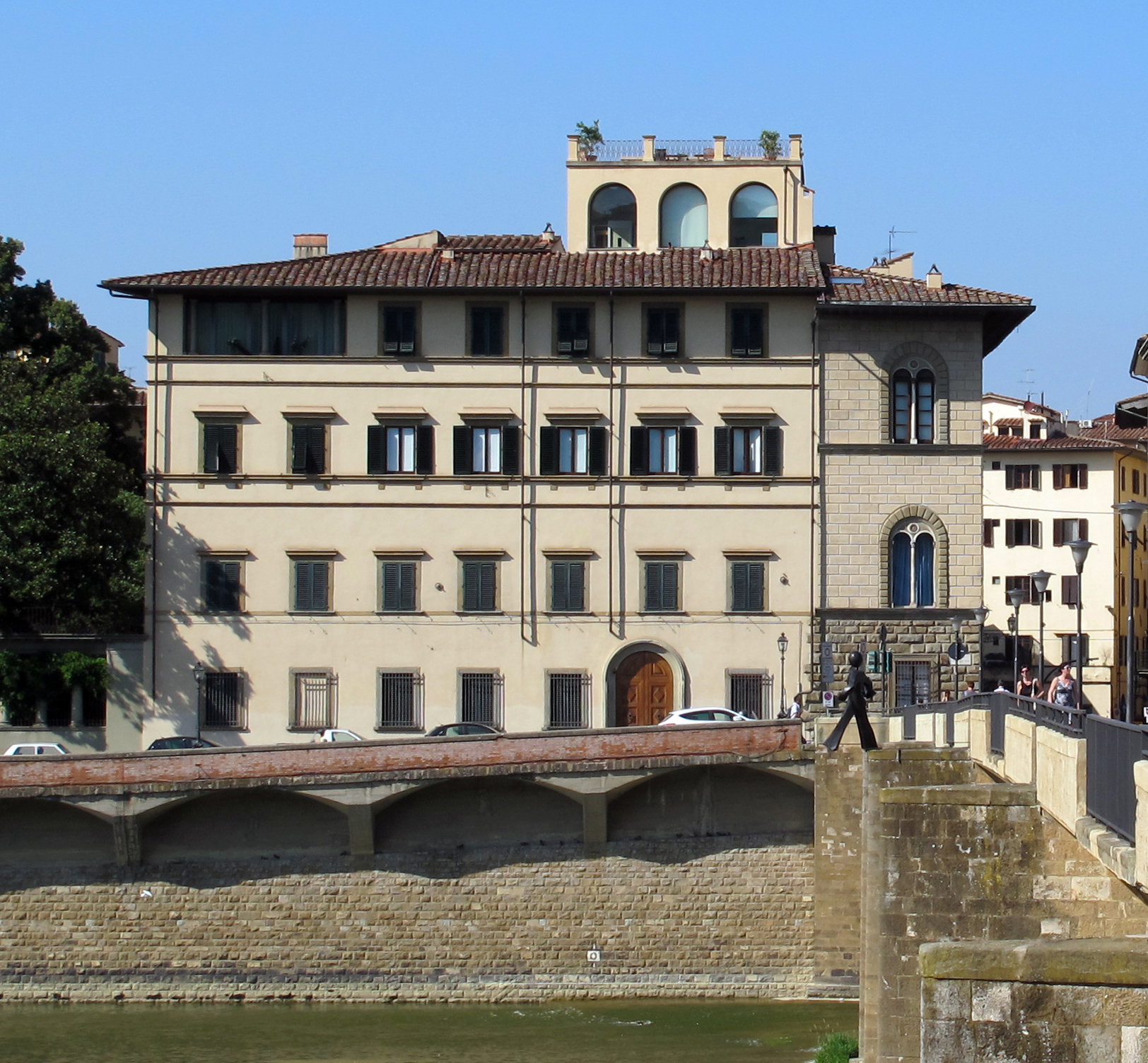
Palazzo Alberti (today known as the Palazzo Malenchini)

Upon the death of his grandfather, Honoré Théodoric d'Albert de Luynes, 8th Duke of Luynes, of Chevreuse and of Chaulnes, in 1867, his elder brother Charles succeeded to the dukedoms of Luynes and Chevreuse and Paul succeeded to the dukedoms of Chaulnes and Picquigny, as their father had died in 1854, predeceasing their grandfather.

While his elder brother used the family's primary seat, the ancient Château de Luynes (in Luynes, overlooking the Loire Valley), Paul lived at his grandfather's preferred residence, the Château de Dampierre in the Yvelines in north-central France (which had been constructed by Charles Honoré d'Albert, duc de Luynes).

After the Franco-Prussian War started in 1870, Chaulnes claimed a place in the armies of National Defense although he was only fifteen years old. His elder brother, the Duke of Luynes, fell on the field of honor at Loigny, the Duc de Chaulnes fought valiantly at the Battle of Coulmiers, where he was seriously wounded in the foot by shrapnel and remained lying on the battlefield for five hours after which he was taken to the Duke of Doudeauville whose surgeon nursed him back to health. His conduct earned him the Cross of the Legion of Honour. After he recovered, he went into the diplomatic corps under the Marquis de Vogué, a friend of his elder brother, who was then the Ambassador of France at Constantinople. Vogué offered Chaulnes a post as attaché, which he accepted. His diplomatic career, however, was short-lived as he was called back to France by family duties.

In 1878, he acquired the Palazzo Alberti in Florence, which had been built by his distant Alberti relative Count Giovan Vincenzo Alberti between 1760 and 1763 . After his death, The Renaissance in Italy and France at the time of Charles VIII, by Eugène Müntz, under the direction and with the assistance of the Duke, was published by Firmin-Didot et Cie in 1885, and which was inspired by his ancestors at Palazzo Alberti, and "a vast collection of documents, correspondence and family records, going back three or four centuries," discovered there.

== Personal life ==
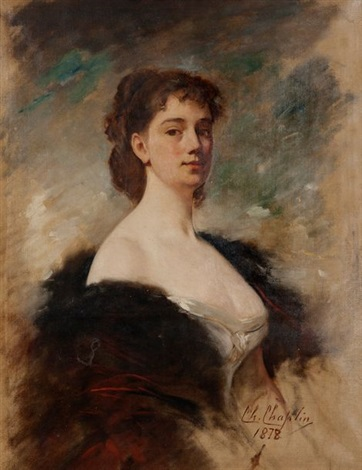
Portrait of his wife, the former Princess Sophie Galitzine, by Charles Joshua Chaplin, 1878

On 31 March 1875, he was married to Princess Sophie Marie Bernardine Golitsyn (1858–1883) in Paris. The Princess was a daughter of Augustin Petrovitch, Prince Galitzine (son of Prince Pyotr Alexeyevich Golitsyn) and Stéphanie Marie Bernadette Louise de la Roche Aymon (a daughter of Antoine de La Roche-Aymon, Marquis de La Roche-Aymon and Marie Louise Vallet de Villeneuve), who owned the Château de Châtain in Arfeuille-Châtain. Together, they were the parents of two children:

- Marie Thérèse Henriette Augustine Sophie d'Albert de Luynes (1876-1941), who married Louis de Crussol d'Uzès, 14th Duke of Uzès, a son of the 12th Duke of Uzès and Anne de Rochechouart de Mortemart, in Paris in 1894.
- Emmanuel Théodore Bernard Marie d'Albert de Luynes (1878–1908), who married American heiress Theodora Mary Shonts, a daughter of Theodore P. Shonts, (Note: Theodora's younger sister, Marguerite Shonts, later married Rutherford Bingham, the son of Gen. Theodore A. Bingham, former New York City Police Commissioner, in 1917.) in New York City in 1908.

The Duke died on 26 September 1881 at the Château de Sablé, his home on the Sarthe River in Sablé-sur-Sarthe and was succeeded in his dukedoms by his only son Emmanuel. Prior to his death, the Duke had been suing the Princess for a separation. His widow died in Paris less than two years later on 14 February 1883.

=== Descendants ===
Through his daughter Marie, he was posthumously a grandfather of Anne Emmanuelle Sophie Pauline Marie Thérèse de Crussol d'Uzès (1895–1984), who married Gaston de La Rochefoucauld, (Note: Gaston de La Rochefoucauld (1893–1930) was a direct descendant of François Alexandre Frédéric, duc de La Rochefoucauld-Liancourt, through his second son, Alexandre, comte de La Rochefoucauld (1767–1841).) Géraud de Crussol d'Uzès (1897–1929), styled Duke of Crussol, who married Evelyn Anne Gordon (daughter of Scots-American millionaire John Gordon) and Emmanuel de Crussol d'Uzès (1902–1952), styled Marquis of Crussol, who married Marie Louise Béziers.

Through his son Emmanuel, he was posthumously a grandfather of Emmanuel Théodore Bernard Marie II d'Albert de Luynes (1908–1980).
