= Duke of Chaulnes =

French peerage title

Coat of Arms of the Duke of Chaulnes

The title of Duke of Chaulnes (French: duc de Chaulnes), a French peerage, is held by the d'Albert family beginning in 1621.

== History ==
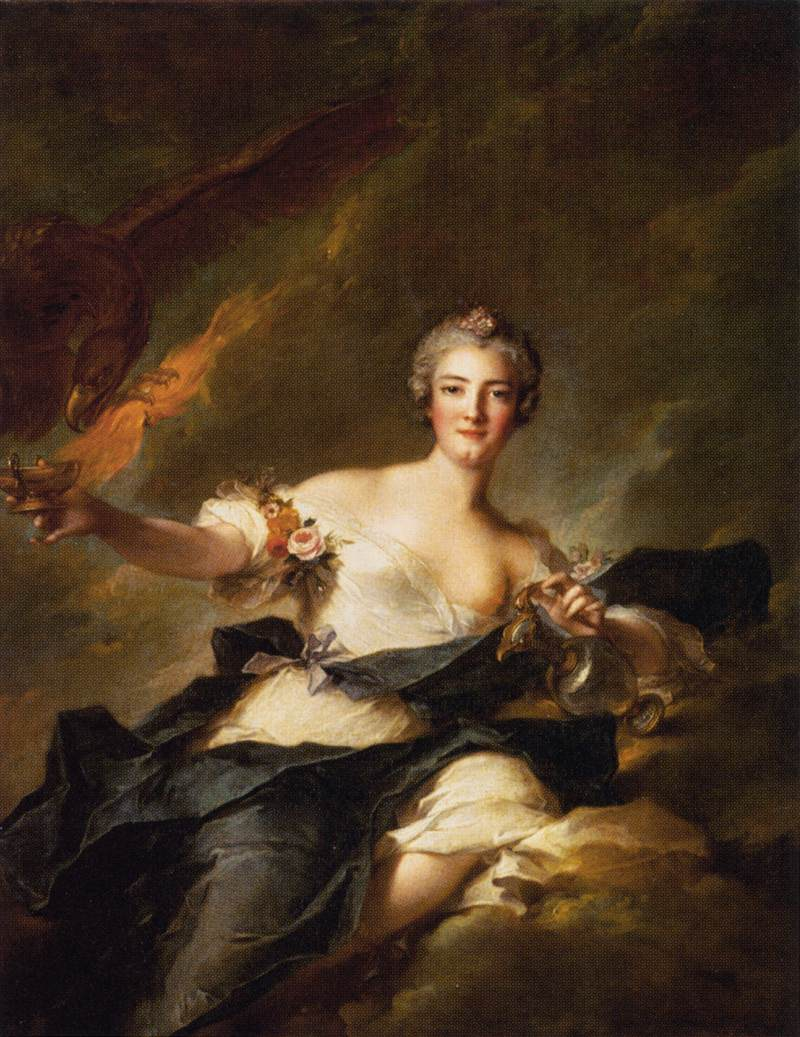
The Duchess of Chaulnes (née Anne Josèphe Bonnier; wife of Michel Ferdinand d'Albert d'Ailly) depicted as the goddess Hebe, by Jean Marc Nattier, 1744

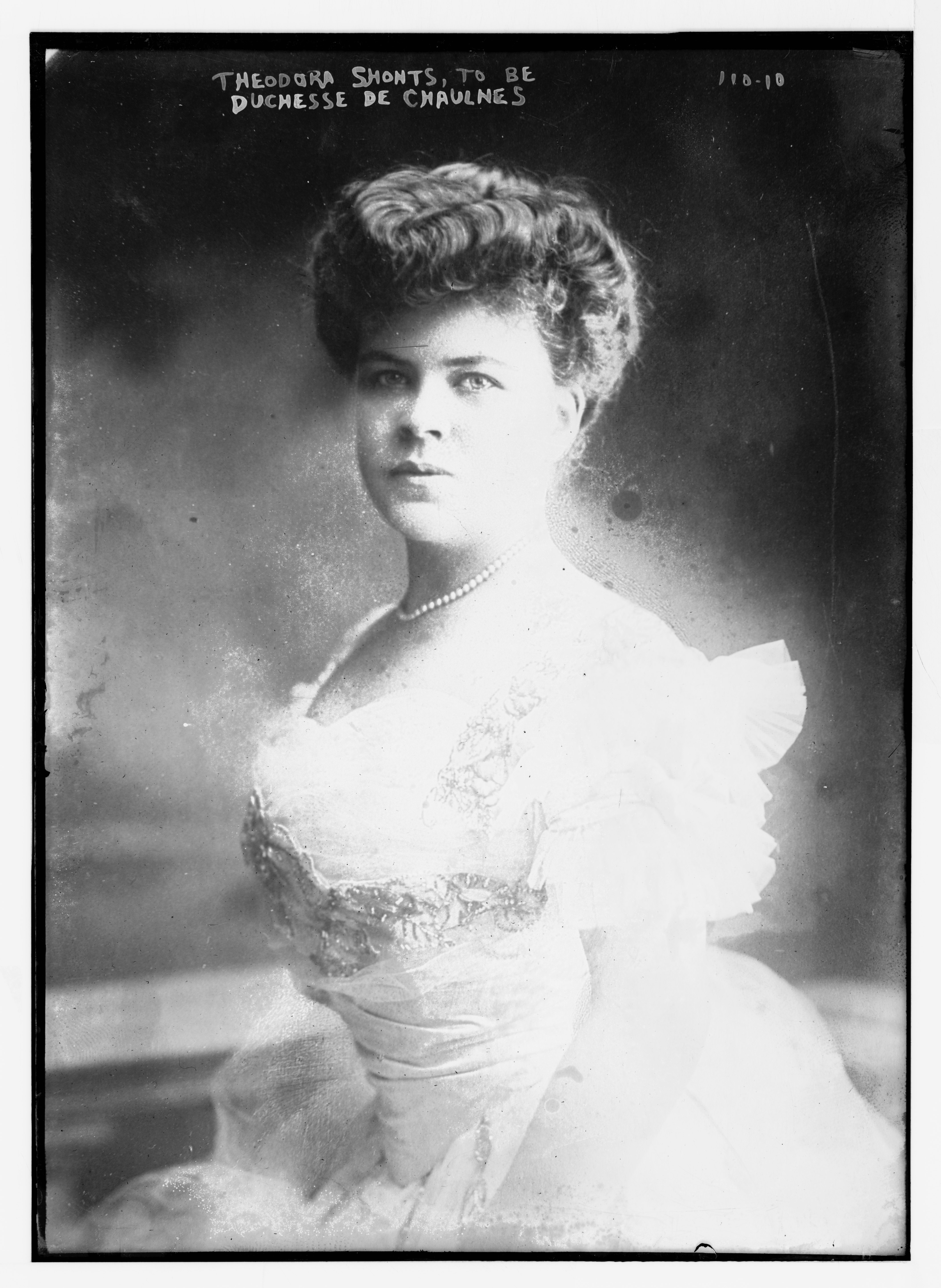
The American heiress, Theodora d'Albert, Duchess of Chaulnes (née Shonts) in 1900, before she married Emmanuel d'Albert de Luynes.

=== First creation (1621–1698) ===
The duchy of Chaulnes was established by letters patent in January 1621 and registered on 6 March 1621 at the Parlement of Paris for the benefit of Honoré d'Albert (1581–1649), Marshal of France in 1619, known as the Marshal de Cadenet, a younger brother of Charles d'Albert, Duke of Luynes (1578–1621).

Honoré d'Albert had married Charlotte Eugénie d'Ailly on 14 January 1620. She was heir to a family holding the titles of Count of Chaulnes (created in December 1563), Vidame d'Amiens and Baron de Picquigny. The marriage contract stipulated that their heirs would take the name and arms of Ailly. The first Duke of Chaulnes had three sons, all of whom took the surname of d'Albert d'Ailly. Of the three sons, only the eldest son Henri-Louis married, but sired only girls. Upon the first Duke's death in 1649, Henri-Louis became the second duke, and when he died four years later in 1653, the title passed to his younger brother, Charles, who became the third Duke.

In 1667, to avoid the title passing into disuse, the 3rd Duke, at the request of his mother, named as his heir Charles Honoré d'Albert de Luynes, 7th Duke of Chevreuse (1646–1712), son of Louis Charles d'Albert de Luynes the 2nd Duke of Luynes. The Duke of Chevreuse's marriage contract stipulated that the title would pass to the youngest child of his marriage, (Note: In 1667, Charles Honoré d'Albert de Luynes married Jeanne Marie Colbert, the daughter of French statesman Jean-Baptiste Colbert, who served as First Minister of State from 1661 until 1683 under the rule of King Louis XIV. Among her siblings were brothers Jean-Baptiste Colbert, Marquis de Seignelay and Jacques-Nicolas Colbert, the Archbishop of Rouen.) and, in case the male line subsequently ended, to the youngest of that name who held the arms of the d'Albert family. Thus two distinct houses were created: Luynes, which the Duke of Chevreuse inherited from his father, and Chaulnes, which remained distinct and separate from the former until the direct line of inheritance came to an end. In that case, the two houses should be reunited until it was possible to separate them again (which happened in 1792).

=== Second creation (1711–1792) ===
With the death of the 3rd Duke of Chaulnes, the first line of d'Albert d'Ailly ended and the duchy of Chaulnes went to the Duke of Chevreuse, Charles Honoré d'Albert de Luynes, who succeeded his father as the 3rd Duke of Luynes the following year in 1699. In 1694, he passed the duchy of Luynes to his eldest son Honoré Charles on the occasion of his marriage to Marie Anne Jeanne de Courcillon (a daughter of Philippe de Courcillon), and assigned the duchy of Chaulnes to his younger son Louis Auguste, Vidame d'Amiens, also on the occasion of his marriage in 1710. This transmission was confirmed by letters patent in October 1711, registered on 1 December 1711, which established Chaulnes as a duchy for the first time in favour of Louis Auguste's son, Charles François. Charles Honoré's eldest son was killed in 1704, and his grandson, Charles Philippe, inherited the duchy of Luynes upon the elder's death in 1712.

In 1732, Charles Philippe d'Albert, the 4th Duke of Luynes, and, his uncle, Louis Auguste, the 4th Duke of Chaulnes, made an agreement whereby the former relinquished his rights over the duchy of Chaulnes, while the latter received confirmation which said that if the duchy of Chaulnes should return to the house of Luynes, it would pass to the youngest child of that family, and then remain in the direct male line (which happened in 1980).

=== Subsequent usage ===
In 1792, upon the death of Louis Joseph d'Albert d'Ailly, the second d'Ailly line ended. Since then, the title of Duke of Chaulnes has been used as an irregular courtesy title in the d'Albert de Luynes family. It was first used by Charles Marie d'Albert de Luynes (a son of Louis Joseph d'Albert, 6th Duke of Luynes), who became the 7th Duke of Luynes in 1807. After Charles Marie's death in 1839, it passed to his son, Honoré Théodoric d'Albert de Luynes, Duke of Luynes, of Chevreuse and of Chaulnes. In 1852, Honoré Théodoric passed it to his grandson Paul d'Albert de Luynes, who took the title of Duke of Chaulnes as a courtesy title. He owned the Château de Sablé. The duchy passed to his son in 1881 and then his son in 1908. Upon the latter's death in 1980, the line ended again and the title reverted to the Duke of Luynes.

Today, the title is carried today as a courtesy title by a younger brother of the penultimate Duke of Luynes. (Note: Jacques d'Albert de Luynes (b. 1946), 13th Duke of Chaulnes is the younger brother of Jean d'Albert, 12th Duke of Luynes (1945–2008), both being sons of Philippe d'Albert de Luynes, 11th Duke of Luynes (1905–1993). After the 12th Duke of Luynes death in 2008, he was succeeded by his eldest son, Philippe d'Albert, 13th Duke of Luynes (b. 1977), nephew of the current Duke of Chaulnes.)

== List of dukes of Chaulnes ==
The dukes of Chaulnes since 1621:

| Number | From | To | Duke of Chaulnes | Relationship to predecessor |
|---|---|---|---|---|
| 1 | 1621 | 1649 | Honoré d'Albert (1581–1649) | 1st Duke of Chaulnes (brother to Charles d'Albert, 1st Duke of Luynes) |
| 2 | 1649 | 1653 | Henri Louis d'Albert d'Ailly (1620–1653) | Son of the former |
| 3 | 1653 | 1698 | Charles d'Albert d'Ailly (1625–1698) | Brother of the former and son of the 1st Duke of Chaulnes |
| 4 | 1698 | 1711 | Louis Auguste d'Albert d'Ailly (1676–1744) | Son of Charles Honoré d'Albert, 3rd Duke of Luynes |
| 5 | 1711 | 1731 | Charles François d'Albert d'Ailly (1707–1731) | Son of the former |
| 6 | 1731 | 1769 | Michel Ferdinand d'Albert d'Ailly (1714–1769) | Brother of the former |
| 7 | 1769 | 1792 | Louis Joseph d'Albert d'Ailly (1741–1792) | Son of the former |
| 8 | 1792 | 1839 | Charles Marie Paul André d'Albert de Luynes (1783–1839) | Son of Louis Joseph d'Albert, 6th Duke of Luynes |
| 9 | 1839 | 1852 | Honoré Théodoric d'Albert de Luynes (1802–1867) | Son of the former |
| 10 | 1852 | 1881 | Paul Marie Stanislas Honoré d'Albert de Luynes (1852–1881) | Grandson of the former (Note: Paul d'Albert de Luynes, 10th Duke of Chaulnes (1852–1881) was the only son of Honoré-Louis d'Albert de Luynes, Duke of Chevreuse (1823–1854), who predeceased his father Honoré Théodoric d'Albert de Luynes, Duke of Luynes, of Chevreuse and of Chaulnes.) |
| 11 | 1881 | 1908 | Emmanuel Théodore Bernard Marie d'Albert de Luynes (1878–1908) | Son of the former |
| 12 | 1908 | 1980 | Emmanuel Théodore Bernard Marie II d'Albert de Luynes (1908–1980) | Son of the former |
| 13 | 1980 | Incumbent | Jacques François Marie Raymond d'Albert de Luynes (b. 1946) | Son of Philippe d'Albert, 11th Duke of Luynes. |

== See also ==
- French nobility
- Chaulnes
- Dukes in France
