= Theodore A. Bingham =

American police commissioner (1858–1934)

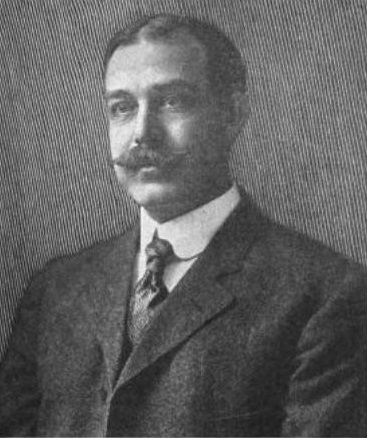

NYPD Commissioner
- In office 1906–1909
- Appointed by: George B. McClellan, Jr.
- Preceded by: William McAdoo
- Succeeded by: William Baker

Personal details
- Born: May 14, 1858 Andover, Connecticut, US
- Died: September 6, 1934 (aged 76) Chester, Nova Scotia, Canada
- Spouses: Lucile Rutherfurd (died 1920) Addison Mitchell (m. 1926; died 1927)
- Education: West Point Military Academy

Military service
- Allegiance: United States
- Branch/service: United States Army
- Years of service: 1879–1904; 1917–1919
- Rank: Brigadier General

Theodore Alfred Bingham (May 14, 1858 – September 6, 1934) was the New York City police commissioner from 1906 to 1909.

== Early life ==
Bingham was born at Andover, Connecticut on May 14, 1858, to Joel Foote Bingham (1827–1914), a clergyman, and Susan Elizabeth (née Grew) Bingham (1834–1908).

Bingham graduated from West Point Military Academy in 1879, receiving a commission as second lieutenant.

== Career ==
Between 1879 and 1892, he served in various capacities as an engineering officer and as a military attaché in Berlin and Rome. He served as superintendent of the public buildings and grounds at Washington from 1897 to 1901 with the rank of colonel. He was transferred to Buffalo, New York on an engineering assignment where he suffered an accident which caused the loss of a leg, forcing his retirement from active service in the army in 1904 at the rank of brigadier general.

He served as police commissioner of New York City from January 1, 1906, to July 1, 1909.

=== Controversial actions ===
In 1907, while serving as police commissioner of New York City, he arranged with Immigration Commissioner Robert Watchorn to allow local New York detectives to search newly arriving immigrants, who he publicly blamed for a "crime wave".

These anti-immigrant policies received wider attention when he published an article in North American Review on "Foreign Criminals" in which he asserted that half the criminals in the city were Jews. In the controversy that followed, he issued a statement denying any malice or prejudice, instead blaming incorrect statistics that "were not compiled by myself, but were furnished me by others".

During Bingham’s tenure as commissioner, the New York City Police Department increased its efforts against Italian “Black Hand” extortion rackets. A central figure in these efforts was Detective Lieutenant Joseph Petrosino, who led the department’s Italian Squad, established in 1904 to investigate Italian organized crime in New York. A charismatic figure, Petrosino and his crime-fighting accomplishments were often reported in the city’s newspapers. In 1909, Bingham sent Petrosino to Italy on a secret mission to gather information that could be used against Sicilian and Italian criminals active in New York. When reporters questioned Bingham about the well-known detective's absence, he replied flippantly, “Why, he may be on the ocean bound for Europe, for all I know.” The historian Francesco Landolfi states that Bingham later disclosed the details of Petrosino’s journey to the New York Herald. These disclosures enabled Black Hand figures to learn of his plans and warn contacts in Italy. Petrosino was murdered in Palermo on March 12, 1909. His assassination received widespread coverage in New York news media.

=== Later life ===
Bingham was removed from his role as police commissioner on July 2, 1909, by Mayor McClellan after he refused to remove photos of individuals not convicted of any crime from his "Rogues Gallery", in defiance of a New York Supreme Court ruling, Gow vs. Bingham. Bingham, defending his refusal, wrote "the police report to me that Duffy [George B. Duffy, 19 y.o.] is a very disorderly person, with a bad reputation, and that some of his associates are degenerates." In 1908 he was elected as a hereditary member of the Connecticut Society of the Cincinnati. In 1911, he served for a few months as chief engineer of the Department of Highways, and from 1911 to 1915, he was a consulting engineer with the Department of Bridges. In 1917, he was recalled to active service in the army in command of the Second Engineering District, New York City. He was discharged from active service and returned to retirement on June 10, 1919.

== Personal life ==
In 1881, Bingham married Lucille Zoe Rutherfurd (1859–1920), a daughter of Thomas Scott Rutherfurd of St. Louis, Missouri. Before her death in 1920 on board the army transport Northern Pacific, they were the parents of:

- Theodore Alexander Rutherfurd Bingham (1884–1948), who married Marguerite Amelia Shonts, daughter of Theodore P. Shonts, in 1917. Marguerite's elder sister, Theodora Mary Shonts, was the wife of Emmanuel d'Albert de Luynes, Duke of Chaulnes.

In 1926, he was married to Addison Mitchell of New York in London. She died, suddenly, a year later on November 21, 1927. Bingham died at his summer home in Chester, Nova Scotia on September 7, 1934, aged 76. He was buried in Chester according to his wishes.

== Dates of rank ==
- Cadet - September 1, 1875
- 2nd Lieutenant - June 13, 1879
- 1st Lieutenant - June 17, 1881
- Captain - July 2, 1889
- Major - July 5, 1898
- Colonel (temporary) - March 9, 1897 to April 30, 1903
- Brigadier General - July 11, 1904
- Retired - July 12, 1904

Police appointments
Preceded by William McAdoo	NYPD Commissioner; 1906–1909	Succeeded by William Baker
