= Picquigny =

- Commune
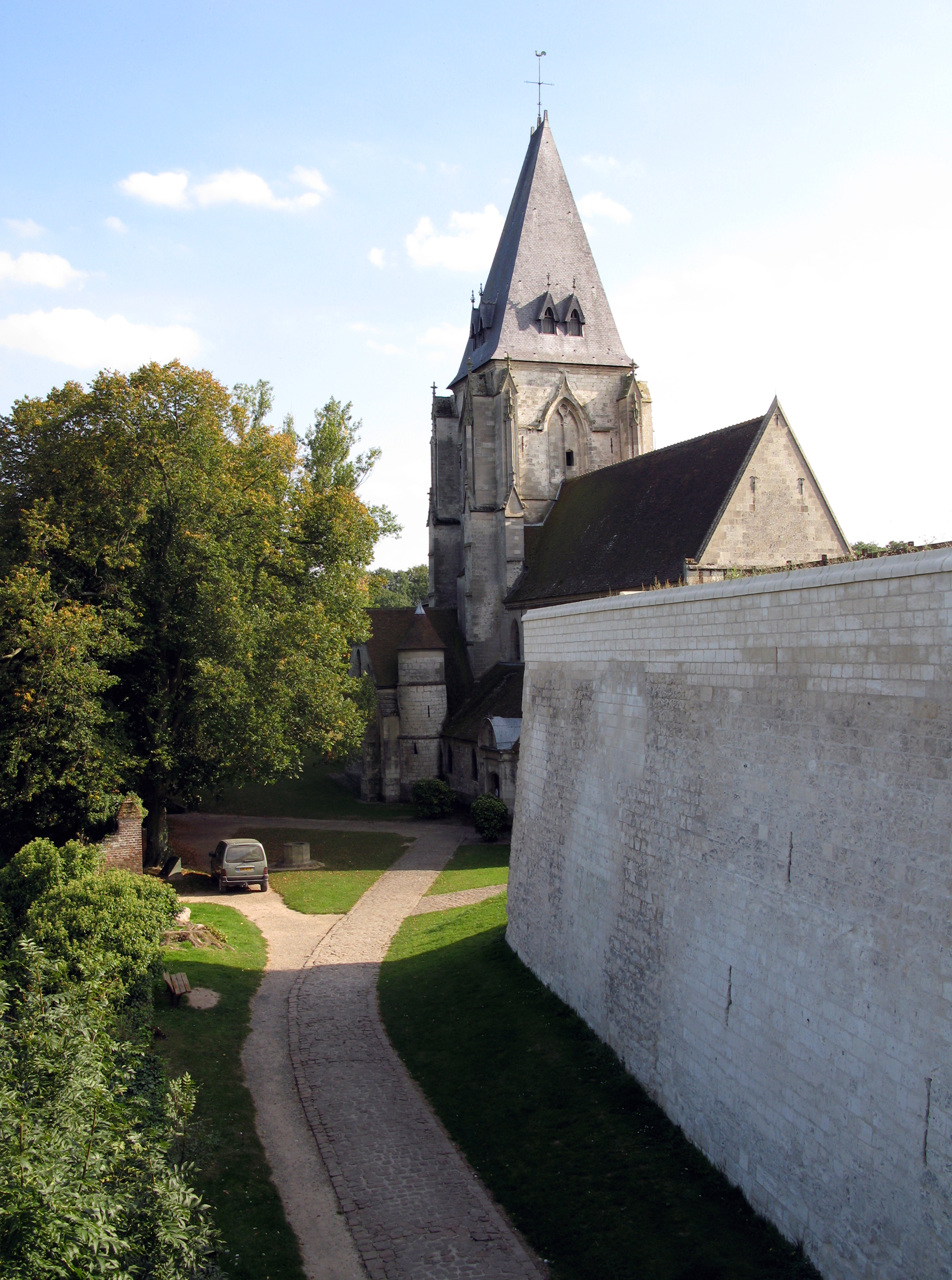
- The church in Picquigny

- Coat of arms
- Location of Picquigny
- Location within France Location within Hauts-de-France
- Coordinates: 49°56′42″N 2°08′41″E
- Country: France
- Region: Hauts-de-France
- Department: Somme
- Arrondissement: Amiens
- Canton: Ailly-sur-Somme
- Intercommunality: CC Nièvre et Somme

Government
  - Mayor (2020–2026): José Herbet
- Area^{1}: 10.31 km^{2} (3.98 sq mi)
- Elevation: 17 m (56 ft)
- Highest elevation: 107 m (351 ft)
- Lowest elevation: 11 m (36 ft)
- Population (2023): 1,273
  - Density: 123.5/km^{2} (319.8/sq mi)
- Time zone: UTC+01:00 (CET)
  - Summer (DST): UTC+02:00 (CEST)
- INSEE/Postal code: 80622 /80310
- ^{1} French Land Register data, which excludes lakes, ponds, glaciers > 1 km^{2} (0.386 sq mi or 247 acres) and river estuaries.

Picquigny (French pronunciation: [pikiɲi]) is a commune in the Somme department in Hauts-de-France in northern France.

== Geography ==
Picquigny is situated at the junction of the N235, the D141 and D3 roads, on the banks of the river Somme, some 8 miles (13 km) northwest (and downstream) of Amiens. Picquigny station has rail connections to Amiens and Abbeville.

== Population ==
Historical population
Year	Pop.	±% p.a.
1968	1,309	—
1975	1,322	+0.14%
1982	1,381	+0.63%
1990	1,397	+0.14%
1999	1,386	−0.09%
2007	1,382	−0.04%
2012	1,363	−0.28%
2017	1,337	−0.38%
2023	1,273	−0.81%
Source: INSEE

== History ==
Already established as a Gallic settlement before the Romans arrived, a Gallo-Roman cemetery was discovered in 1895 in the area known as Les Vignes.

Known through the ages by various names, in 942 as Pinquigniacum, Pinconii castrum in 1066 and Pinchiniacum in 1110, then as Pinkeni, Pinkinei and Pecquigny .

After the defeat of the Huns at Lihons-en-Santerre, the inhabitants of Amiens, who had helped the barbarians, took refuge in the castle of Picquigny, to hide from the vengeance of Dagobert, where they were then besieged by him.

On 17 December 942, Arnulf I, Count of Flanders and William I, Duke of Normandy came to Picquigny to sign a peace treaty. They met on a small island in the Somme, having both left their armies behind. After the meeting, William left but was then assassinated by Arnulf's supporters.

As early as the 14th century, the town had commune status and a county judge. In 1307, several Templars were arrested and imprisoned in the dungeons of the château by order of Philip IV of France,

Following Edward IV of England's invasion of France in 1475 to claim the French throne, Louis XI bought off Edward at the Treaty of Picquigny with a cash payment of an annual sum of fifty thousand crowns and the promise not to support his domestic enemies. Edward then withdrew his army.

In 1547, Henry II of France established a market, on every second Monday of the month.

== Main sights ==
- Château de Picquigny: Built around the beginning of the 11th century and rebuilt over the following centuries. It was severely damaged during World War I. The vestiges are still picturesque and imposing, nevertheless. Outside of the ramparts, there are other medieval buildings : a prison, a kitchen, two cellars, latrines and the Pavillon Sévigné.
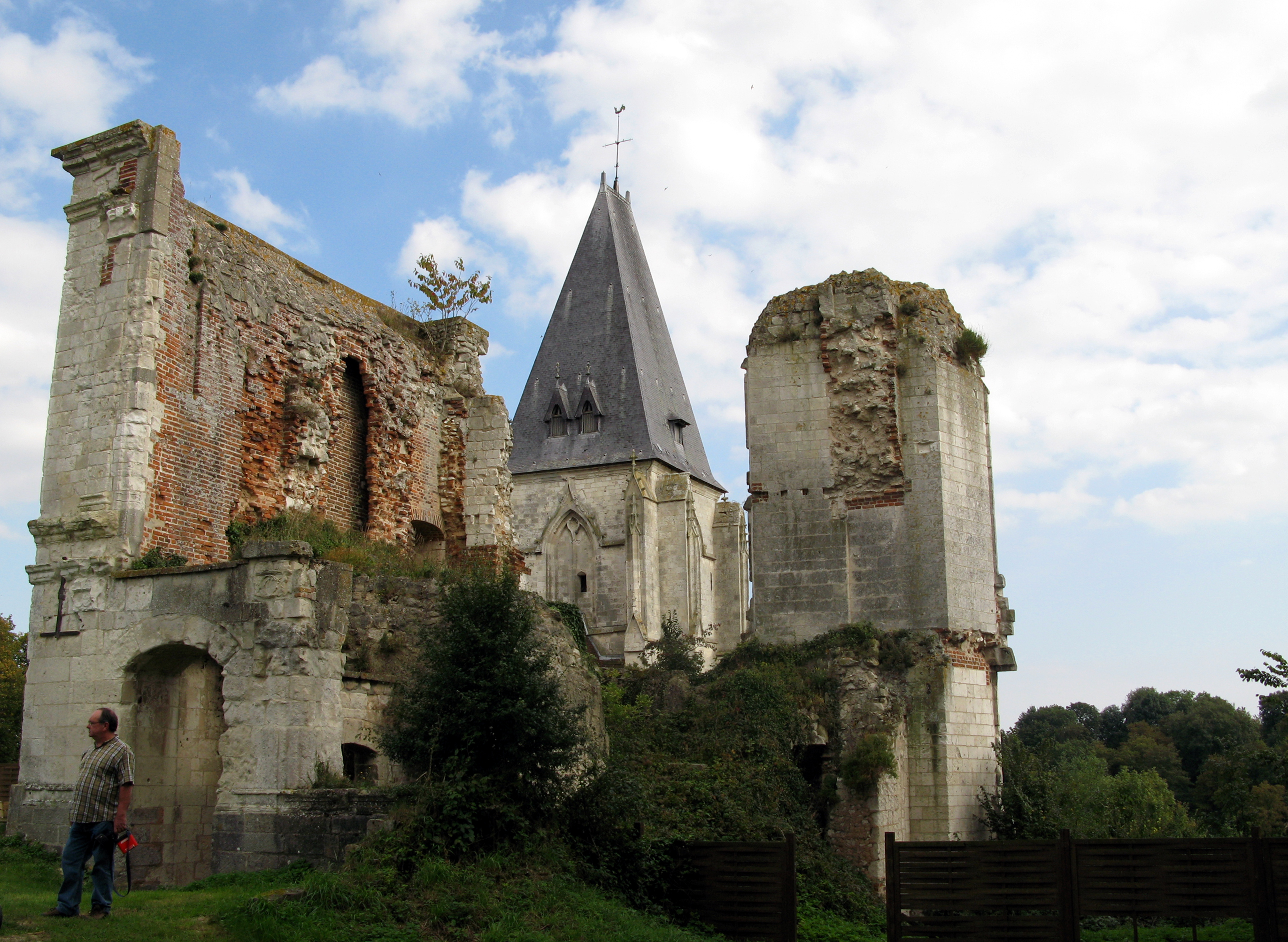
The ruins of the château

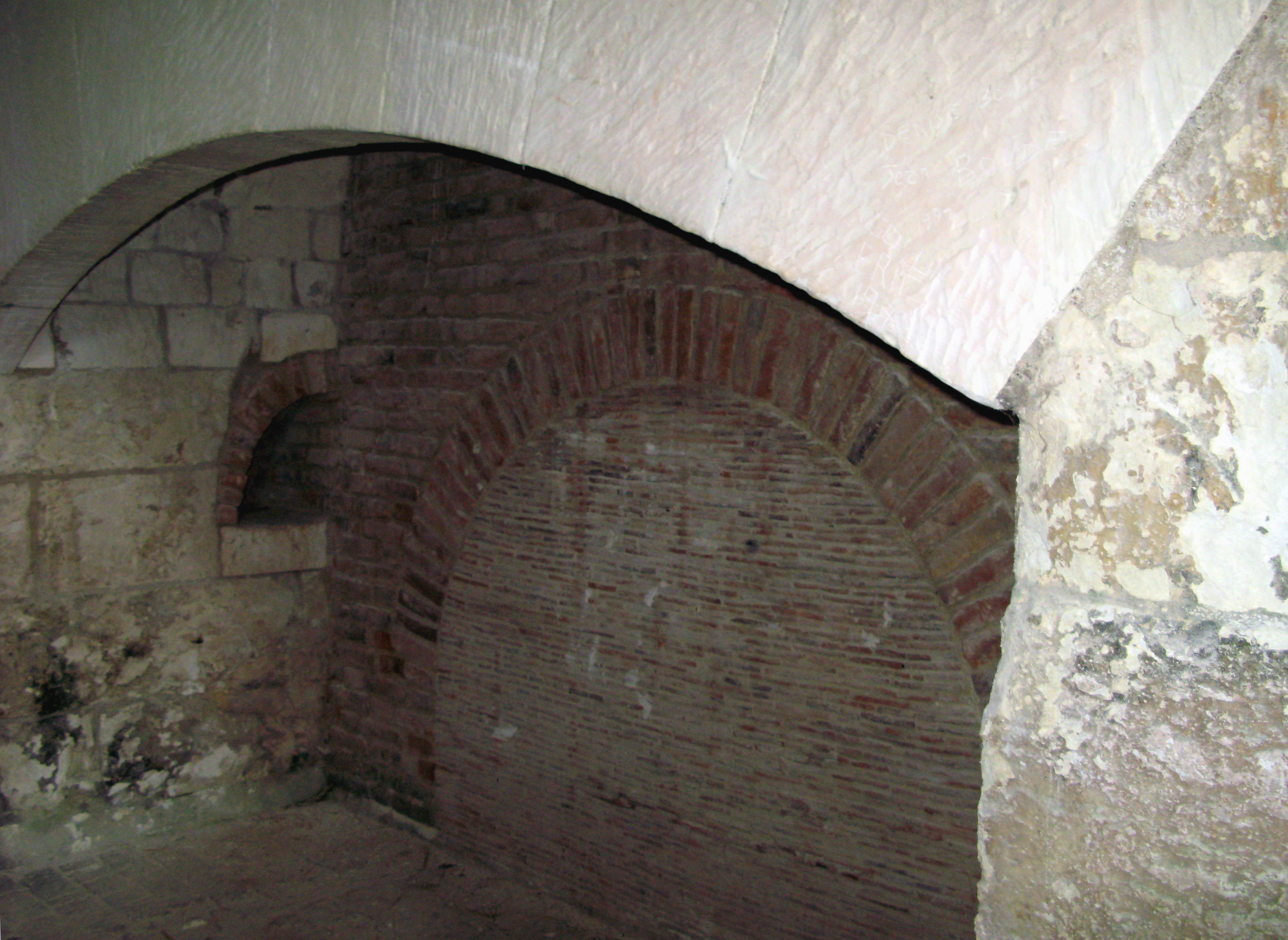
The kitchen fireplace

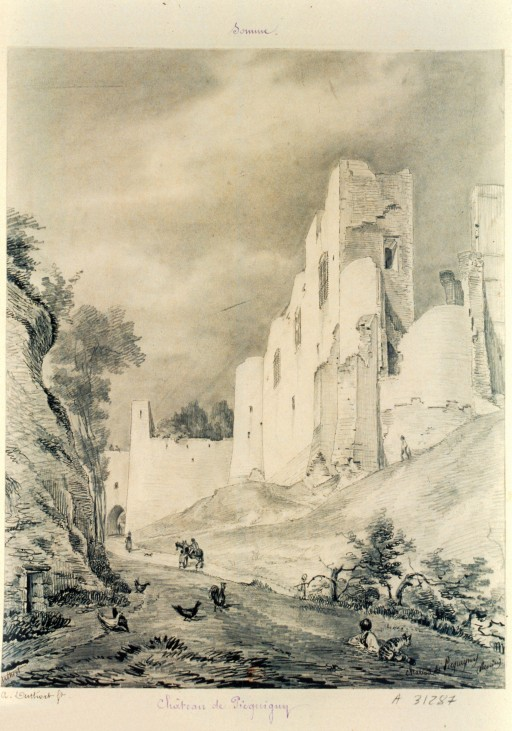
Louis Duthoit (1807-1874) - Château de Picquigny
- The church: Originally the chapel to the château, it can be found behind the ruins of the old château, inside the ramparts. The roof was destroyed in a fire at the start of the 20th century.
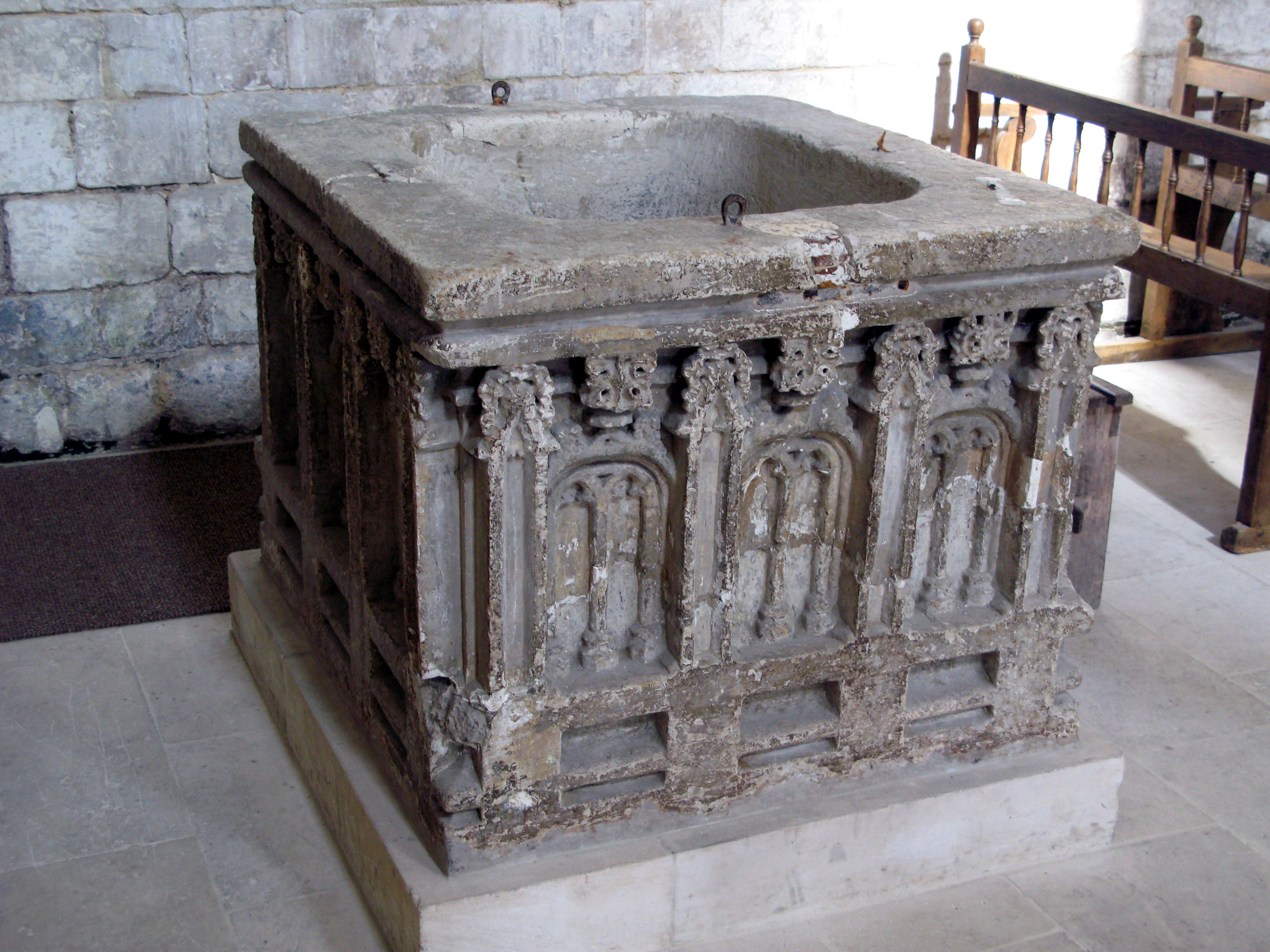
The baptismal font, behind which are steps down to the crypt

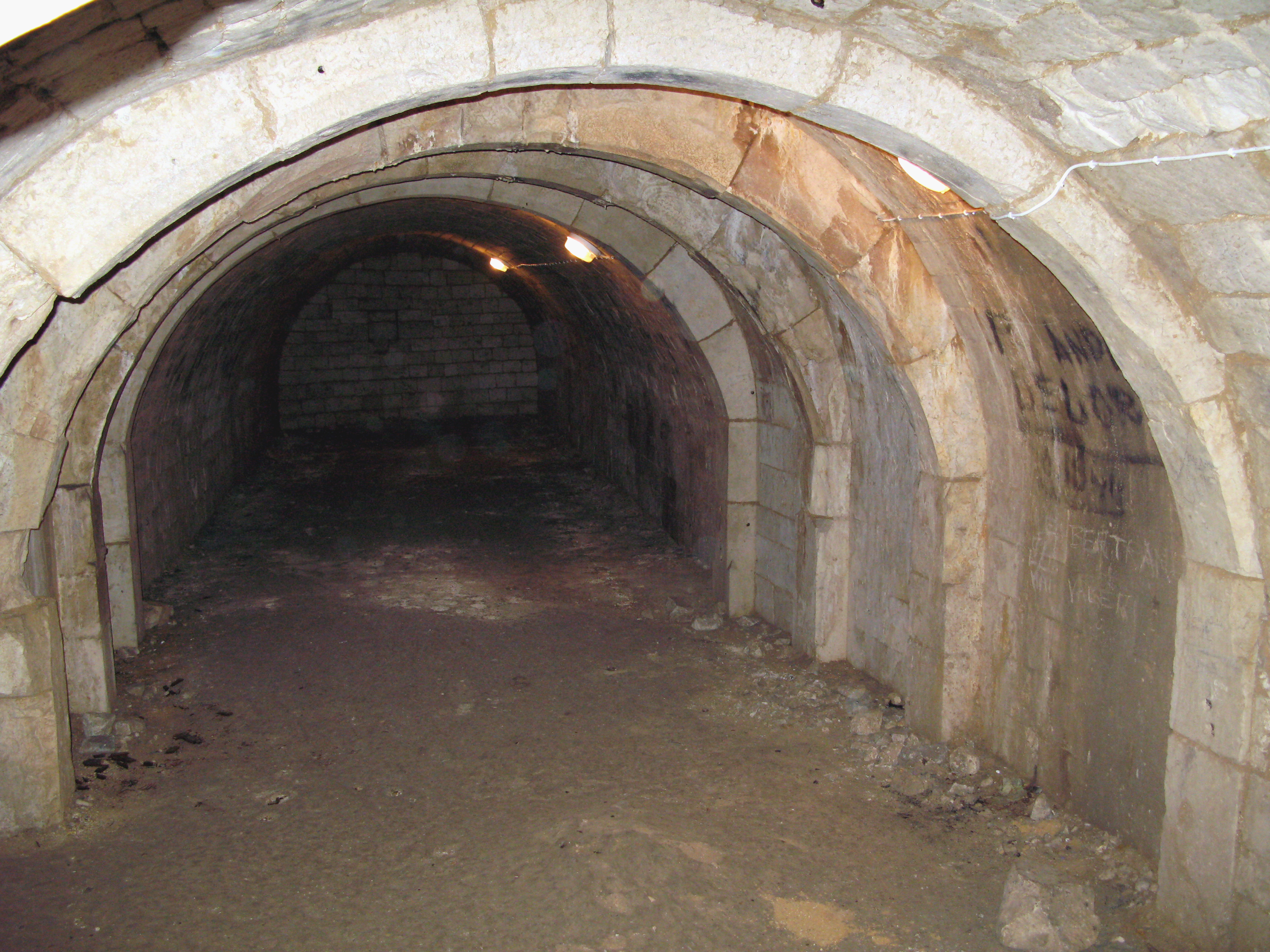
The crypt of the church

== Notable people ==
- Patriarch Warmund of Jerusalem, Crusader, Latin Patriarch of Jerusalem during the early 12th century.

== See also ==
- Communes of the Somme department
