= Hôtel de Chevreuse (rue Saint-Thomas-du-Louvre) =

Former hotel in France

Hôtel de Chevreuse; Hôtel d'Épernon; Hôtel de Longueville
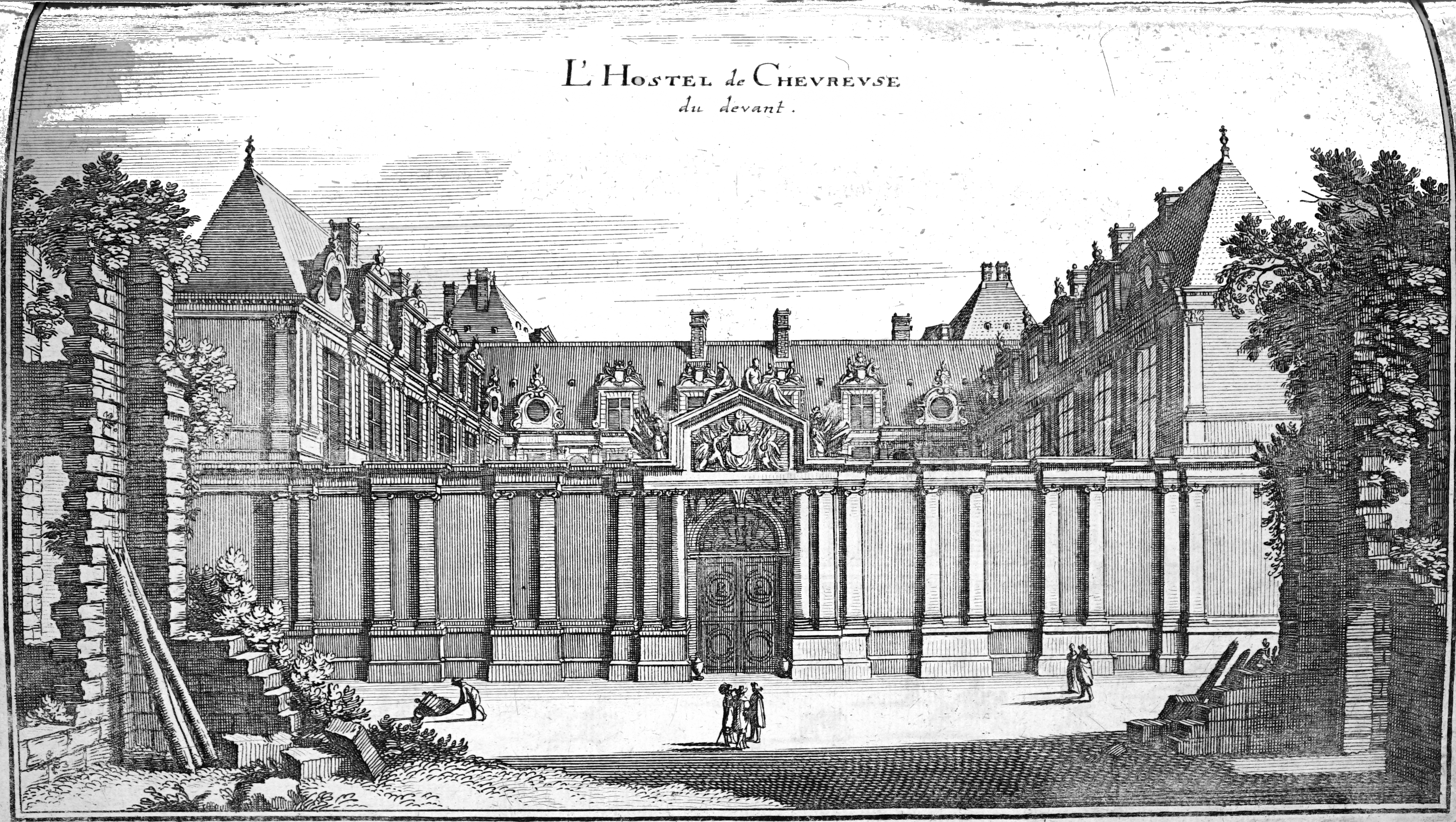
- Street front of the Hôtel de Chevreuse before 1655, engraved after Jean Marot and published in Topographia Galliae
- Interactive map of the: Hôtel de Chevreuse; Hôtel d'Épernon; Hôtel de Longueville; area

General information
- Location: Rue Saint-Thomas-du-Louvre, Paris, France
- Coordinates: 48°51′41″N 2°20′05″E
- Construction started: 1622
- Demolished: 1834

Design and construction
- Architect: Clément Métezeau

The Hôtel de Chevreuse (French pronunciation: [otɛl də ʃəvʁøz]; later Hôtel d'Épernon [otɛl depɛʁnɔ̃], then Hôtel de Longueville [otɛl də lɔ̃ɡvil]) was an aristocratic townhouse (hôtel particulier), built in 1622 and located on the west side of the Rue Saint-Thomas-du-Louvre on a site now part of the Cour Napoléon on the west side of the Louvre in Paris, France. The hôtel was destroyed in 1834.

== Ownership history ==
An earlier hôtel on the site was sold in 1620 for 175,000 livres to Charles d'Albert, Duke of Luynes, who the following year united it with an adjacent house to the west for 8,000 écus. The property then extended to the ramparts (Wall of Charles V), part of which Louis XIII had given to Luynes, reserving four toises for the passage of the Rue Saint-Nicaise. After Luynes died in December 1621, the property passed to his widow, Marie de Rohan.

The old hôtel was demolished and the Hôtel de Chevreuse was built in 1622–1623 to the designs of the architect Clément Métezeau for Marie de Rohan's new husband, Claude of Lorraine, Duke of Chevreuse, who had purchased the property from her just before their marriage on 21 April 1622. They hosted the Duke of Buckingham in May 1625, who came to escort Henrietta Maria to England.

After the Duke's death in 1657, she sold it for 400,000 livres to the Duke of Candale, who put it in the name of his father Bernard de Nogaret, Duc d'Épernon.

The Duke of Épernon died on 25 July 1661, and on 30 July 1662, Marie-Claire de Bauffrement, widow of Gaston de Foix, Comte de Fleix, relinquished it to Louis XIV for 488,722 livres, 8 sous, 9 deniers. On 13 August, Louis gave it to Duke Henri II de Longueville, in exchange for the hôtel the latter had in the Rue des Poulies. The Duke of Longueville died the following year, and his daughter, Marie d'Orléans de Longueville, having inherited all of his estates following the deaths of her brothers, gave it to her cousin, Louis-Henri de Bourbon-Soissons (known under the name of Prince of Neufchâtel), who died in 1703. On 30 July 1710, his daughter, Louise de Bourbon, brought it as part of her dowry to Charles Philippe d'Albert, Duke of Luynes, to whose family the property thus returned.

== On old maps of Paris ==
The hôtel is depicted on the 1652 Gomboust map of Paris with an entrance screen and a central porte cochère on the rue Saint-Thomas-du Louvre, a cour d'honneur with two lateral wings and a corps de logis between the entrance court and a large garden, which runs all the way to the rue Saint-Niçaise on the west. It is also shown in a somewhat different configuration on the Turgot map of Paris, published in 1739.

On old maps of Paris

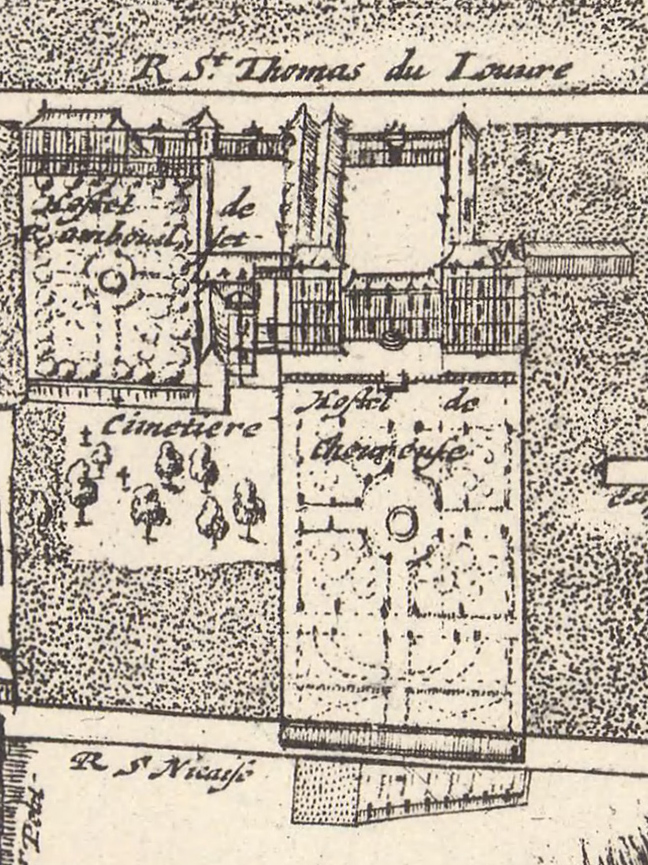
Shown as the Hôtel de Chevreuse on the 1652 Gomboust map of Paris (east at the top)

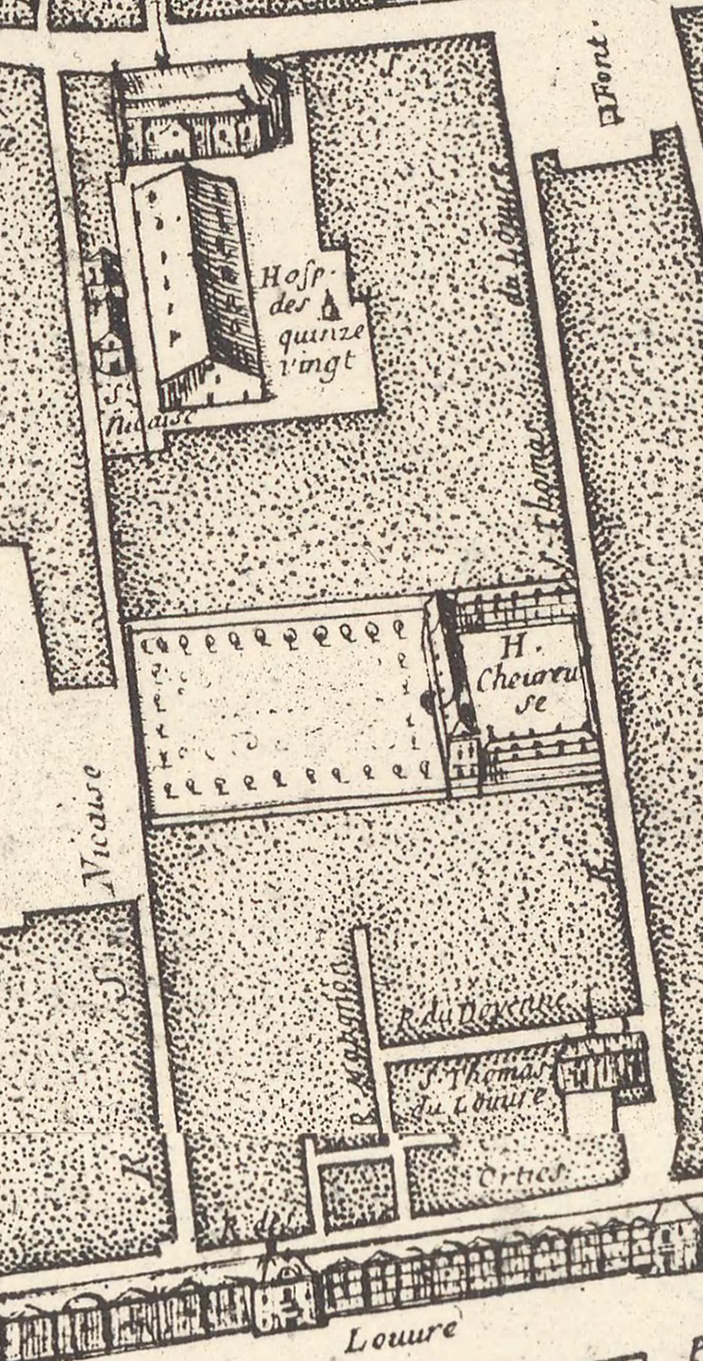
Shown as the Hôtel Chevreuse on the 1672 Jouvin-de-Rochefort map of Paris (north at the top)

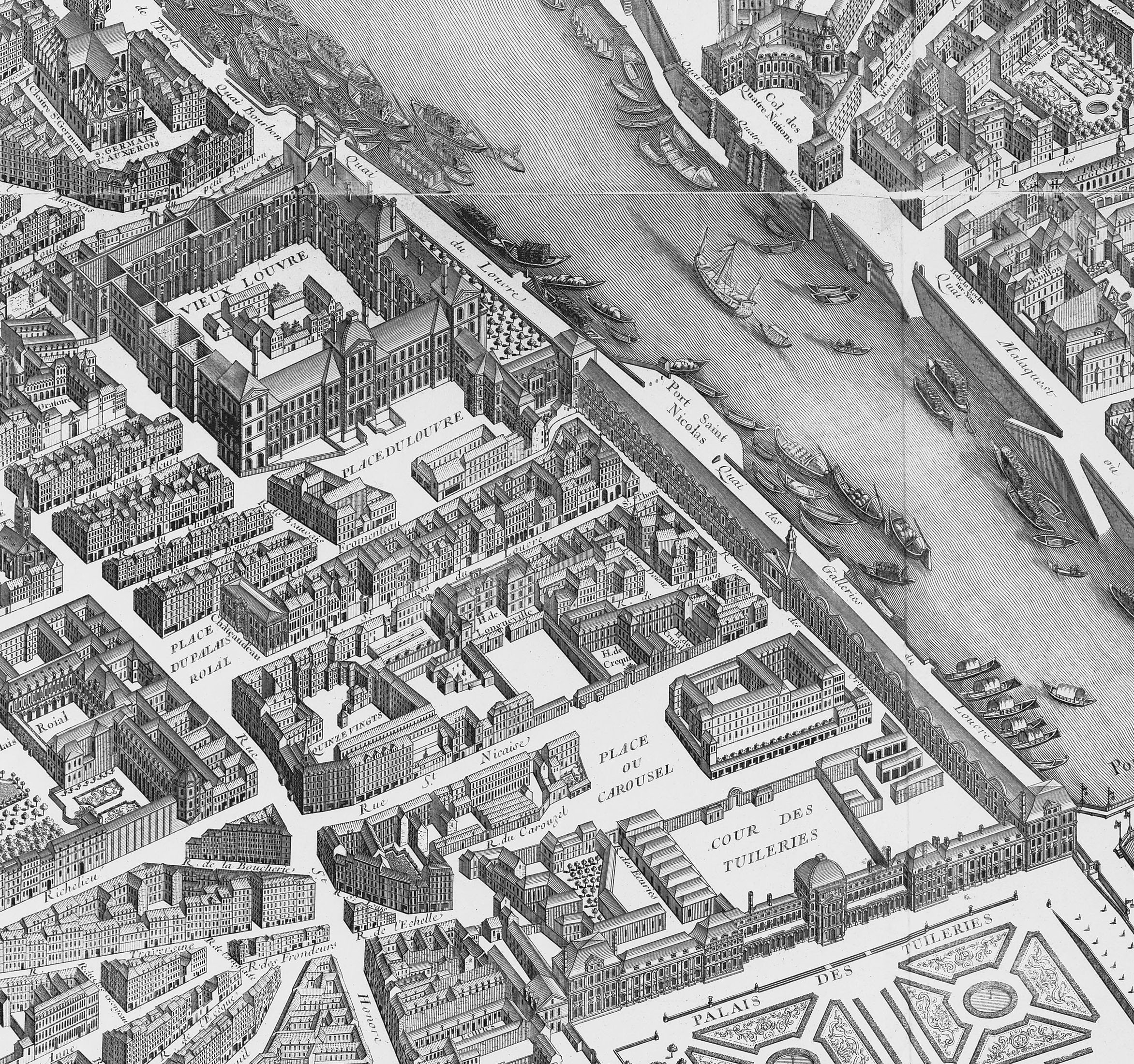
Shown as the Hôtel de Longueville on the 1739 Turgot map of Paris (southeast at the top)

== Depictions by Jean Marot ==
The street and garden façades of the hôtel were engraved by Jean Marot. The two engravings were re-engraved and published in 1655 in volume one of Martin Zeiller's Topographia Galliae. A view of the street front from a higher perspectivew with a cutout of the entrance screen was engraved by Marot c. 1670.

Other views by Jean Marot

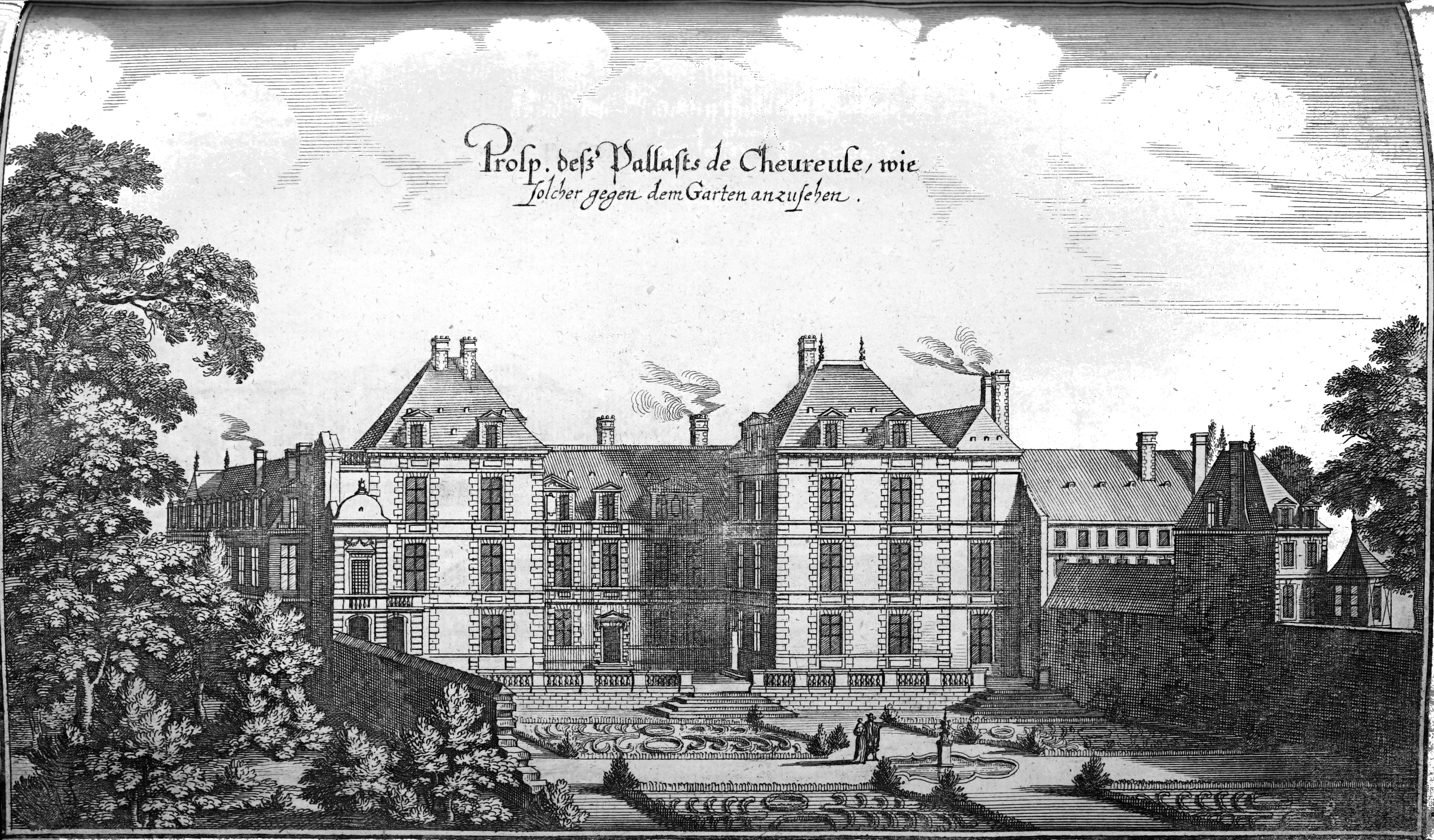
Garden façade of the Hôtel de Chevreuse before 1655, engraved after Jean Marot and published in Topographia Galliae

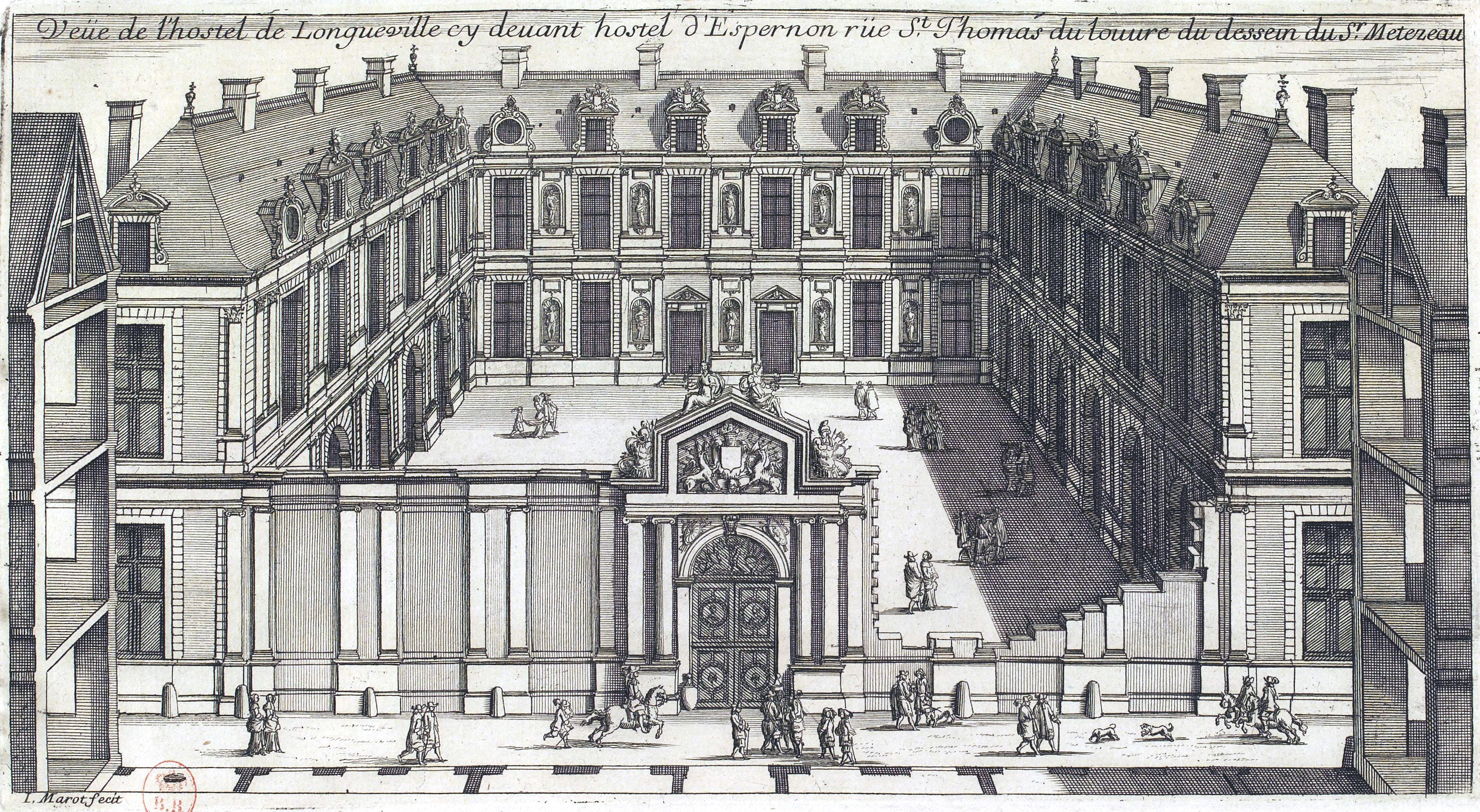
Street front of the Hôtel de Longueville, as engraved by Jean Marot c. 1670

== See also ==
- Hôtel de Rambouillet, located immediately to the north of the Hôtel de Chevreuse

== Bibliography ==
- Berty, Adolphe (1885). "Hôtel d'O, de la Vieuville, de Chevreuse, d'Épernon, et de Longueville", pp. 103–105, in Topographie historique du vieux Paris: Région du Louvre et des Tuileries, second edition, vol. 1. Paris: Imprimerie Nationale.
- Deutsch, Kristina (2015). Jean Marot : Un graveur d'architecture à l'époque de Louis XIV. Berlin: De Gruyter. ISBN 9783110375954.
- Gady, Alexandre (2008). Les Hôtels particuliers de Paris du Moyen Âge à la Belle Époque. Paris: Parigramme. ISBN 9782840962137.
