= Marie de Rohan =

French courtier (1600–1679)

- Duchess of Chevreuse; Duchess of Luynes
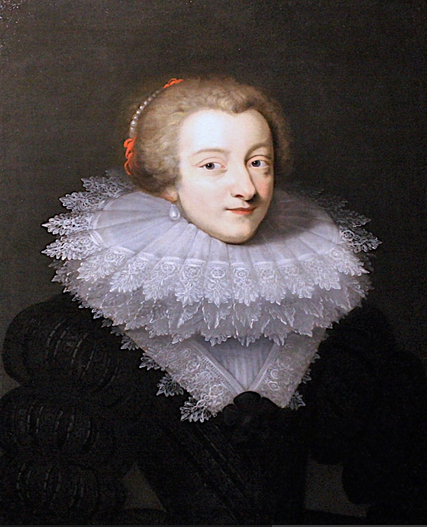
- Marie de Rohan, duchesse de Luynes (c.1621)
- Full name: Marie Aimée de Rohan
- Born: December 1600; Paris, France
- Died: 12 August 1679 (aged 78); Gagny, France
- Noble family: House of Rohan
- Spouses: Charles d'Albert, Duke of Luynes (m. 1617; died 1621) Claude of Lorraine, Duke of Chevreuse (m. 1622; died 1657)
- Issue Detail: Louis Charles d'Albert de Luynes; Anne Marie, Abbess of Remiremont; Charlotte Marie, Mademoiselle de Chevreuse; Henriette, Abbess of Jouarre
- Father: Hercule de Rohan
- Mother: Madeleine de Lenoncourt

Marie Aimée de Rohan (French pronunciation: [maʁi ɛme də ʁɔɑ̃]; December 1600 – 12 August 1679) was a French courtier and political activist, famed for being the centre of many of the intrigues of the first half of the 17th century in France. In various sources, she is often known simply as Madame de Chevreuse.

== Early life ==
Marie de Rohan, styled Mademoiselle de Montbazon, was the daughter of Hercule, Duke of Montbazon, who was governor of Paris and Île-de-France, pair de France, Grand Huntsman, and of princely rank at the French court of Henry IV. As head of the House of Rohan, he owned great estates in Brittany and Anjou. Her mother was Madeleine de Lenoncourt, who died two years after her daughter was born.

Her youngest half-brother was François, Prince of Soubise, founder of the Soubise line of the House of Rohan. His wife was Anne de Rohan-Chabot, Madame de Soubise, who was, for a period, a mistress of Louis XIV.

== First marriage ==
On 13 September 1617, Marie de Rohan married Charles d'Albert, seigneur de Luynes, a favourite of King Louis XIII. He formed her taste for unscrupulous political intrigue, introducing her at court. In December 1618, Louis XIII named her to the newly created post of surintendante of the queen's household, prompting the première dame du palais, the much older and now outranked widow of the Connétable de Montmorency, to resign in protest. Initially, the queen consort, Anne of Austria, was jealous and disliked Madame de Luynes, as the king paid her far too much attention, but eventually, through assiduous efforts, her influence with the queen became unrivaled.

On 26 January 1619, Marie de Rohan gave birth to a daughter, Anne Marie, named after the queen and her mother. In August, Marie de Rohan's husband Charles was made governor of Picardy and Duke of Luynes, and on 14 November was officially received as a duke and a Peer of France at a ceremony in the great hall of the Parlement of Paris. With their elevated status, the Duke and Duchess of Luynes were able to sign a contract on 22 January 1620, arranging a marriage between their one-year-old daughter and the one-year-old Charles Louis de Lorraine, Duke of Joyeuse, a son of Charles, Duke of Guise. They agreed to pay a dowry of 60,000 livres, to which the king added 100,000 livres. Since the children were so young, the marriage was to take place after they became adults. Subsequent events made this impossible, and Anne Marie died unmarried in 1646. A second daughter was born early in 1620, but she died about ten years later.

On Christmas night 1620, attended by the queen, Marie de Rohan gave birth to Luynes' son and heir, Louis Charles, named after the king and his father. Paris church bells were rung to celebrate the event, and cannons were fired at the medieval Château de Caen, where the king and the duke were staying. Their son was baptised in Paris with Louis XIII as godfather and the king's mother, Marie de Médicis, as godmother. The entire court attended, and it was said to have cost the king 80,000 livres. After Luynes died of scarlet fever in 1621, Louis Charles became the second Duke of Luynes and married his mother's sister, Anne de Rohan. His daughter Jeanne Baptiste, simultaneously Marie's granddaughter and niece, was the mistress of Victor Amadeus II of Sardinia and ancestress of the Savoy kings of Italy.

== Second marriage ==
The now Dowager Duchess of Luynes inherited the Duke's Paris townhouse (hôtel particulier) on the rue Saint-Thomas-du-Louvre. She sold it to Claude of Lorraine, Duke of Chevreuse, shortly before her marriage to him on 21 April 1622. Her new husband had it extensively altered by the royal architect Clément Métezeau in 1622–1623, when it became the new Hôtel de Chevreuse. From this second marriage, she had three daughters. Two of them became nuns, Anne-Marie of Lorraine (1625–52), abbess of Pont-aux-Dames, and Henriette of Lorraine (1631–93), abbess of Jouarre and later at Port-Royal. The third daughter, Charlotte-Marie of Lorraine (1627–52), having failed to wed Armand de Bourbon, Prince of Conti, became the mistress of Cardinal de Retz and played a role in the Fronde, but never married.

== Fall from favour, conspiracies ==
Friend and confidante of the queen, she was banished from court after an incident in which she had encouraged the pregnant queen in boisterous games in the corridors of the Louvre, resulting in a miscarriage. The duc de Chevreuse used all his influence to have her restored to court.

In her attempts to regain her lost position, she provoked or encouraged the conspiracies of the court, such as the Buckingham affair (1623–24) that compromised the Queen, which she instigated with the connivance of her English lover, Henry Rich, later created Earl of Holland, and of the highest-ranking aristocrats against Richelieu, such as her complicity in the Chalais conspiracy involving her lover, the comte de Chalais, that she set up in 1626, with the unlikely intention of replacing Louis XIII with his brother, Gaston d'Orléans. Chalais, deeply embroiled, lost his head on 19 August 1626, while the duchesse de Chevreuse fled to Lorraine, where she soon carried on an affair with Charles IV, Duke of Lorraine, who intervened on her behalf to have her allowed to return to France; once she was re-established at Dampierre, her subversion of royal power continued.

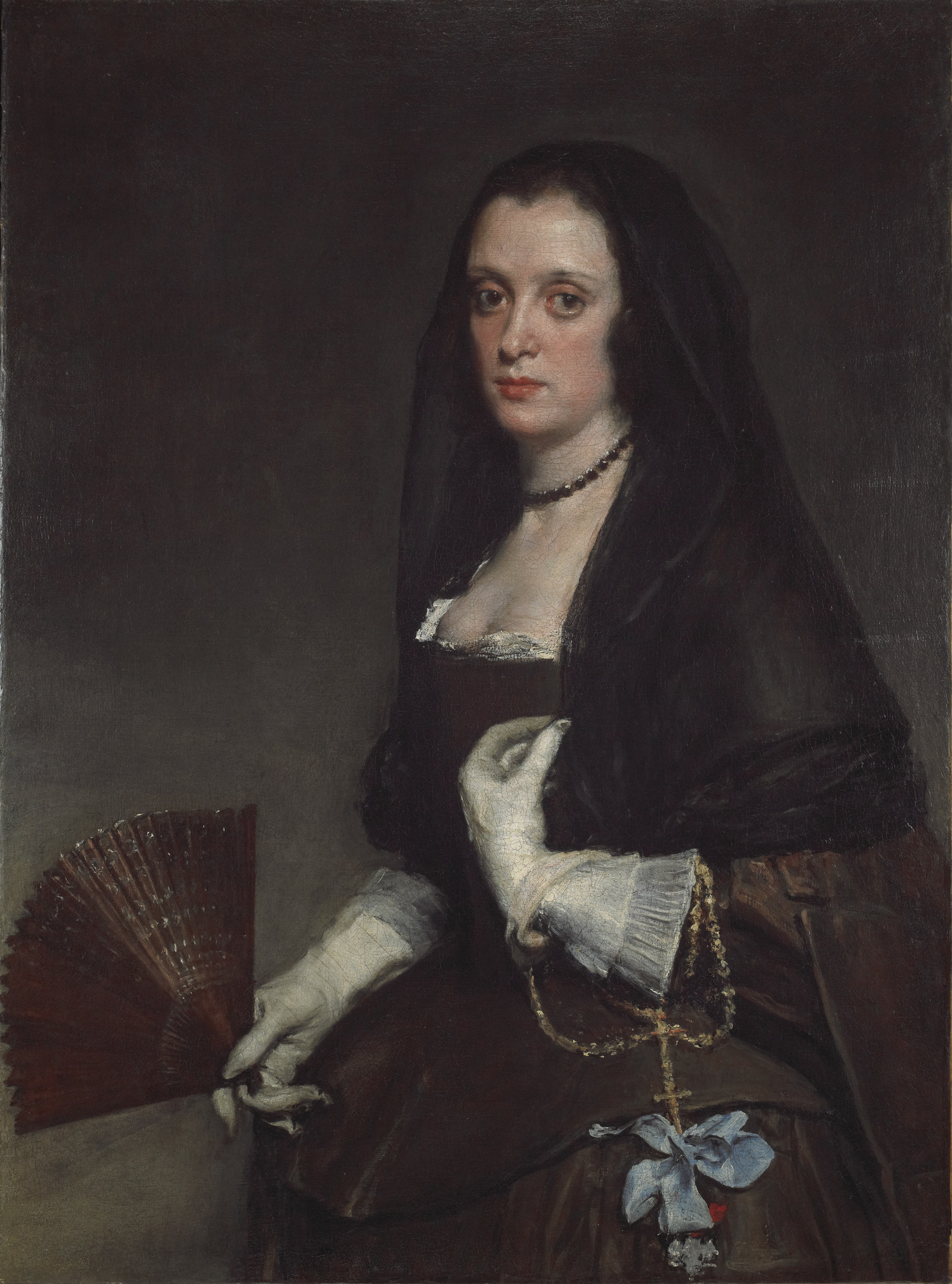
Velázquez's The Lady with a Fan is purported to be a likeness of the duchess, although the features of the sitter differ remarkably from other extant portraits of Marie Aimée.

She was at the centre of all the intrigues that involved foreign powers against France: negotiations with the duchy of Lorraine and with Spain conducted by Charles de l'Aubespine, marquis de Châteauneuf, keeper of the seals, who ruined himself on her behalf, revealing to her the councils of the king (1633). Secret exchanges of correspondence with Spain carried out by Anne of Austria were unmasked in 1637, requiring the Duchesse de Chevreuse to flee to Spain, then to England, and finally to Flanders. She was involved in the conspiracy of the comte de Soissons (1641) and at the death of the king, a clause in the testament of succession forbade the return to France of the duchesse; a decision of the Parlement of Paris was required to break the will.

After the death of Richelieu, once again in France, she conspired at the center of the cabale des Importants led by Chateauneuf against Mazarin, in 1643; with the arrest and exile of César de Bourbon, duc de Vendôme, she fled once again. During the Fronde, she came closer to Mazarin for a time (1649–50), but then she switched back to the aristocratic party when the parliamentary Fronde and the aristocratic Fronde joined forces in 1651.

After the death of the Duke of Chevreuse in 1657, the now Dowager Duchess of Chevreuse sold her hôtel on the rue Saint-Thomas-du-Louvre to the Duc de Candale, who put it in the name of his father, Bernard de Nogaret, duc d'Épernon. In 1660 she had a new Hôtel de Chevreuse built on the rue Saint-Dominique to the designs of the architect Pierre Le Muet.

She died in retirement in the convent of Gagny (Seine-Saint-Denis département) in 1679.

== Biographies ==
Victor Cousin published a biography in 1856, which was published in an English translation by Mary L. Booth in 1871. H. Noel Williams' A Fair Conspirator: Marie de Rohan, Duchesse de Chevreuse was published in 1913. Modern biographies are by Denis Tillinac (L'Ange du désordre, (Paris: Robert Laffont) 1985, by Christian Bouyer, La Duchesse de Chevreuse : L'Indomptable et voluptueuse adversaire de Louis XIII (Paris: Pygmalion-Gérard Watelet) 2002, and by Georges Poisson (Paris:Librairie Académique Perrin) 1999.

== In fiction ==
Alexandre Dumas entangles her in the plots of The Three Musketeers, in which she is said to be the mistress of the musketeer Aramis, and Twenty Years After, in which Raoul, the hero of the third novel of Dumas' trilogy, is the secret son of the Duchesse de Chevreuse and the musketeer Athos.

Gaetano Donizetti's tragic opera Maria di Rohan, which debuted at the Kärntnertor theater in Vienna on 5 June 1843, followed by a success in Paris in November, was freely based on the conspiracy of Chalais.

In 2002, she was portrayed by Wendy Albiston in the Doctor Who audio drama The Church and the Crown.

Juliette Benzoni published two novels in French based on her life: Marie des intrigues (2004) and Marie des passions (2005).

== Issue and marriages ==
- Married Charles d'Albert, Duke of Luynes in Paris on 13 September 1617; had one son;
  - Louis Charles d'Albert de Luynes, Duke of Luynes (25 December 1620 – 10 October 1690), who married three times:
    - Louise Marie Seguier, Marquise d'O in 1641, had issue;
    - Anne de Rohan (daughter of Hercule, Duke of Montbazon) in 1661 and had issue including Jeanne Baptiste d'Albert de Luynes; and,
    - Marguerite d'Aligre in 1685, no issue.
- Married again to Claude de Lorraine, Duke of Chevreuse in Paris on 20 April 1622 and had three daughters;
  - Anne Marie de Lorraine (1624 – 5 August 1652) never married; Abbess of Remiremont and Pont-aux-Dames;
  - Charlotte Marie de Lorraine, Mademoiselle de Chevreuse (1626 – 7 November 1652) never married;
  - Henriette de Lorraine (1631 – 25 January 1694) never married; Abbess of Notre Dame, Jouarre.

== Bibliography ==
- Batiffol, Louis (1920). La Duchesse de Chevreuse: Une Vie d'Aventures et d'Intriques sous Louis XIII (at Hathitrust). Paris: Hachette.
- Berty, Adolphe (1885). "Hôtel d'O, de la Vieuville, de Chevreuse, d'Épernon, et de Longueville", pp. 103–105, in Topographie historique du vieux Paris: Région du Louvre et des Tuileries, second edition, vol. 1. Paris: Imprimerie Nationale.
- Gady, Alexandre (2008). Les Hôtels particuliers de Paris du Moyen Âge à la Belle Époque. Paris: Parigramme. ISBN 9782840962137.
- Kettering, Sharon (2008). Power and Reputation at the Court of Louis XIII: The Career of Charles d'Albert, duc de Luynes (1578–1621). Manchester: Manchester University Press. ISBN 9780719089985.
- Moote, Lloyd (1989). Louis XIII, the Just. Berkeley: University of California Press. ISBN 9780520064850.
- Williams, H. Noel (1913). A Fair Conspirator: Marie de Rohan, Duchesse de Chevreuse (at Hathitrust). New York: Charles Scribner's Sons.

Court offices
Preceded by None; office created.	Surintendante de la Maison de la Reine to the Queen of France; 1619–1637	Succeeded by ?
