= Medieval Louvre Castle =

Demolished castle in Paris, France

Coordinates: 48.860247°N 2.338002°E

Louvre Castle
- Part of Louvre Palace
- Paris, France
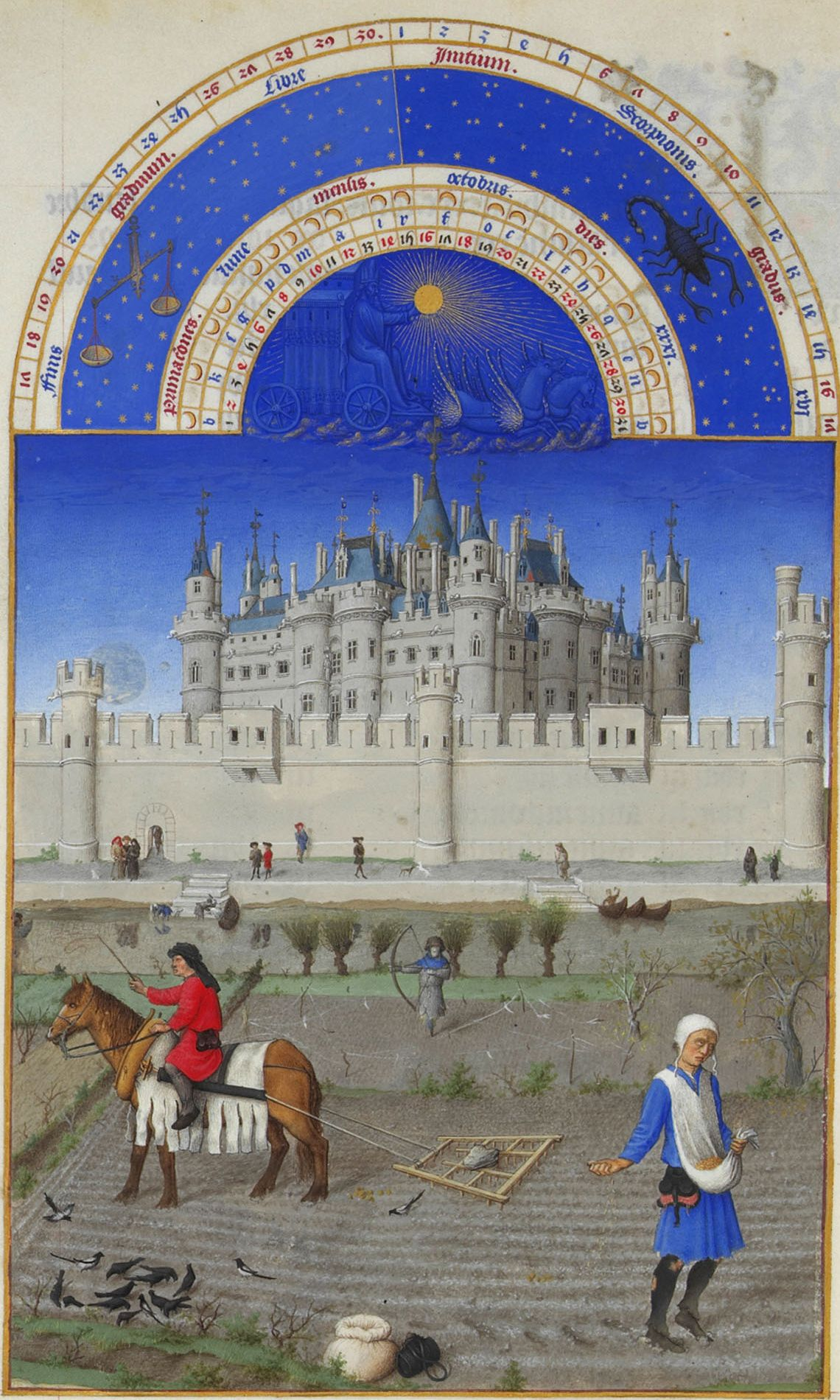
- The castle in the 15th century as illustrated in the Très Riches Heures du Duc de Berry

Site information
- Type: Medieval castle
- Condition: destroyed

Location

Site history
- Built: From 1190
- Built by: French kings from Philip II of France
- Demolished: 1528–1660
- Events: Imprisonment of Ferdinand, Count of Flanders (1214-1226); Estates General of France (1303); Birth and death of John I of France (1316); Visits of Emperors Charles IV of Luxembourg (1377-1378), Manuel II Palaiologos (1400-1402), Sigismund of Luxembourg (1416), and Charles V of Habsburg (1540); Hundred Years' War (England occupies Paris in 1420–1436); St. Bartholomew's Day massacre (1572); Murder of Concino Concini (1617)

The Louvre Castle (French: Château du Louvre), also referred to as the Medieval Louvre (French: Louvre médiéval), was a castle (French: château fort) begun by Philip II of France on the right bank of the Seine, to reinforce the city wall he had built around Paris. Over time, it was expanded but was generally demolished above ground in stages between 1528 and 1660 to make way for expanding the Louvre Palace, while some parts of the castle's foundations were incorporated in construction of the later palace.

== Name ==
The semantic distinction between a Louvre "castle" in the Middle Ages and "palace" in the modern era is no more than a recent usage. The medieval complex was often referred to simply as the Louvre (French: le Louvre), as its modern successor still is. It was also qualified in medieval times as a fortress (French: forteresse du Louvre, royal abode (French: demeure royale du Louvre), or mansion (French: hostel du Louvre or manoir du Louvre). Conversely, the Louvre Palace was still referred to as a castle (French: château du Louvre) until the mid-18th century if not later.

== History ==
=== Fortress ===
Before his departure for the Third Crusade in 1190, King Philip II wanted to protect his capital Paris against invasions, especially from English-held Normandy less than 100 km away, with memories still lingering of the Viking siege of Paris in 845. He ordered the construction of a new city wall, known since as the Wall of Philip II Augustus, which was started in 1190 on the right bank. The fortress was nearly squared in plan (78 m by 72 m), surrounded by a 10 m wide moat filled with water from the nearby Seine river. It was reinforced by ten defensive towers, on the corners and at the middle of each side, with twin towers defending narrow gates on the southern and eastern sides, protected by drawbridges. Two additional buildings housing the garrisons and the arsenals were located outside of the surrounding wall, to the west and south of the central courtyard, respectively.

A keep named the "big tower" (Grosse Tour du Louvre) was built around 1200 in the center of the courtyard. It was a circular structure with a diameter of 15.6 m and 30 m tall, with walls 4.25 m thick at the base. It was surrounded by a ditch, 9 m wide and 6 m deep. This ditch was dry (not a water-filled moat) and paved with large irregular stones. It was crossed by a drawbridge, whose interior arch was built in stone to limit the risk of fire. The keep had a conical roof slate over the machicolation. It also had a well and a large tank for supporting long sieges, as well as a chapel inside. The choice of a round rather than squared or rectangular keep was for military reasons since attackers could more easily sap a wall with a squared tower than one with a circular tower.

=== Royal residence ===
The Louvre evolved gradually away from its initial purely military function. Louis IX had new rooms built in 1230–1240 without any real defensive purpose, including a ceremonial room that was later known as the Salle Saint-Louis. The Louvre became a residence intermittently during the troubled times of the 14th century. By the mid-14th century, Paris had grown well beyond the walls of Philip II. Étienne Marcel had started building a new city wall further to the west, which King Charles V the Wise (1364-1380) brought to completion, later known as the Wall of Charles V. Soon after becoming king, Charles initiated a major transformation of the Louvre into a prestigious royal residence. His architect Raymond du Temple added upper floors, windows, turrets, sculpted decoration, and gardens. Charles V repurposed the northwest tower, formerly known as Tour de la Fauconnerie (Falconry), into the first French Royal Library containing over nine hundred manuscripts.

During the Hundred Years' War, English soldiers commanded by Henry V of England, who was allied to the Burgundians who controlled Paris, entered the city. In December 1420, the English occupied the Louvre Castle without a fight. There, they found a Paris ruined by civil war and scarcity and stayed there until 1436.

=== Demolition and rebuilding ===
In 1525, Francis I of France was defeated at Pavia and held prisoner. During his captivity, the court interfered with the King's decisions using its droit de remontrance (French for right of remonstrance). In addition, the faculty of theology and the Parlement of Paris started to show some independence. The King held a lit de justice on 24, 26 and 27 July 1526, during which he demonstrated his authority and decided to take back his kingdom and make the Louvre castle his main residence in Paris. As a symbol of his authority, he ordered the demolition of the dungeon in 1528 in order to build an Italian style palace. In 1546, he charged the architect Pierre Lescot to build a modern palace in the spirit of the Renaissance architecture, with a large hôtel particulier and ceremonial rooms. After the death of Francis in 1547, his son Henry II of France continued the work by Pierre Lescot. Between December 1546 and March 1549, he had the west wall destroyed to build a ballroom and the south wall to erect the royal pavilion (1553–1556), which housed the royal apartments and the small gallery.

After the death of Henry II, his widow Catherine de' Medici continued the development of the south wing for her apartments. From 1564 onwards, she prioritised the construction of the new Tuileries Palace and the establishment of a large Renaissance garden.

Under Henry III of France, the Louvre became a space for royalty, a place of entertainment and the theater of historical events such as the marriage of the future King Henry IV of France with Margaret of Valois, which led to the St. Bartholomew's Day massacre in 1572.

During his reign, Henry IV destroyed the remaining elements on the south side, including the moat, in order to build the Grande Galerie (Great Gallery in French) connecting the Louvre and the Tuileries. This was completed in 1610. He also began the construction of the Cour Carrée on the base of the existing Lescot wing. The surface was four times the size of the original medieval court. Some buildings between the two palaces were also destroyed. This project, named le Grand Dessein (the Grand Design in French), also had a military function by establishing a covered walkway between the Louvre and the Tuileries outside the city walls. Henry IV created this walkway in case he needed to flee on horseback during a riot.

In order to establish his power, on 24 April 1617 the young Louis XIII murdered Concino Concini, the favorite of his mother Marie de' Medici, at the entrance gate connecting the castle to the city.

Louis XIII demolished the northern part of the medieval enclosure in order to extend the Lescot wing in this direction, providing symmetry. The eastern part was demolished by Louis XIV to allow for the construction of the Louvre Colonnade.

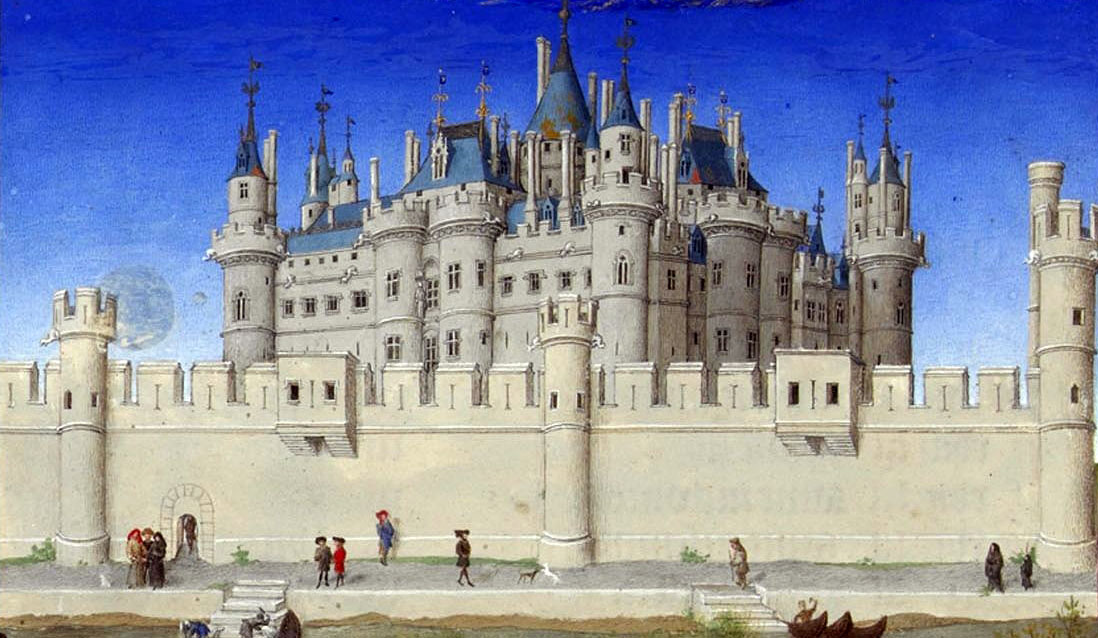
The Louvre pictured in the Très Riches Heures du Duc de Berry, 1410s

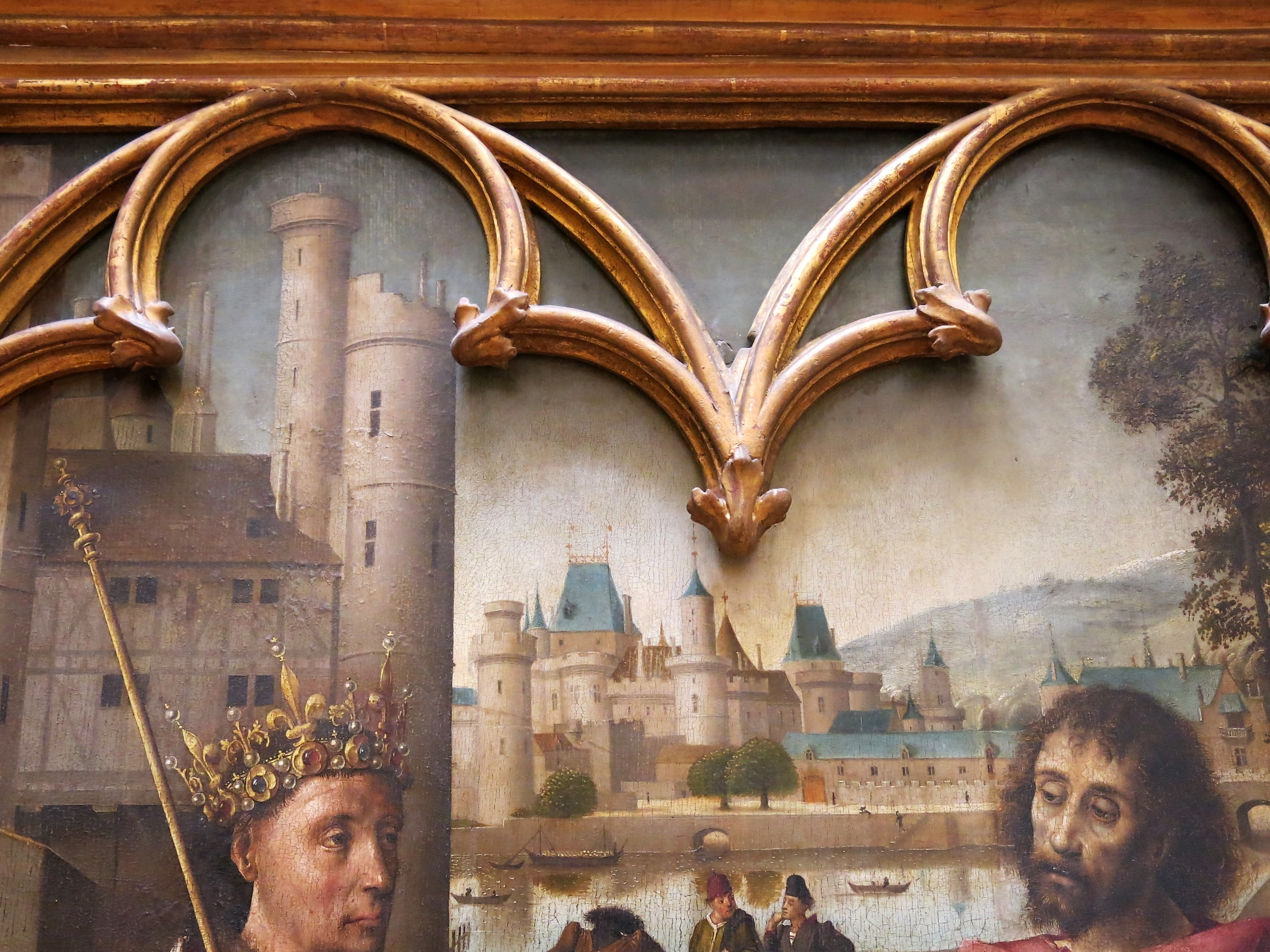
The Louvre pictured in the Altarpiece of the Parlement de Paris, mid-15th century

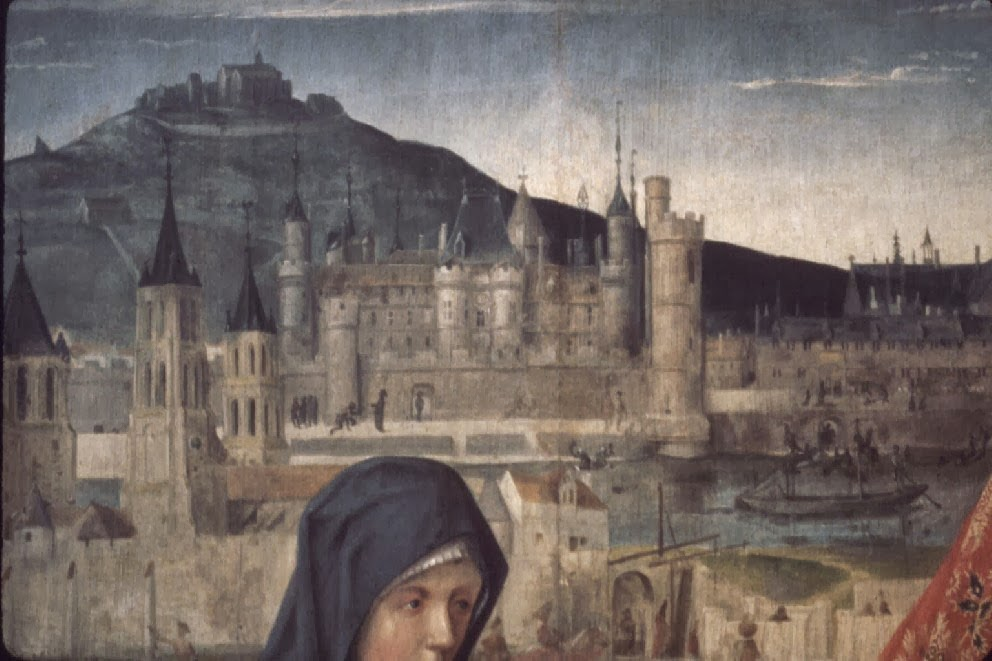
The Louvre seen from the south, pictured in the Pietà of Saint-Germain-des-Prés, late 15th century

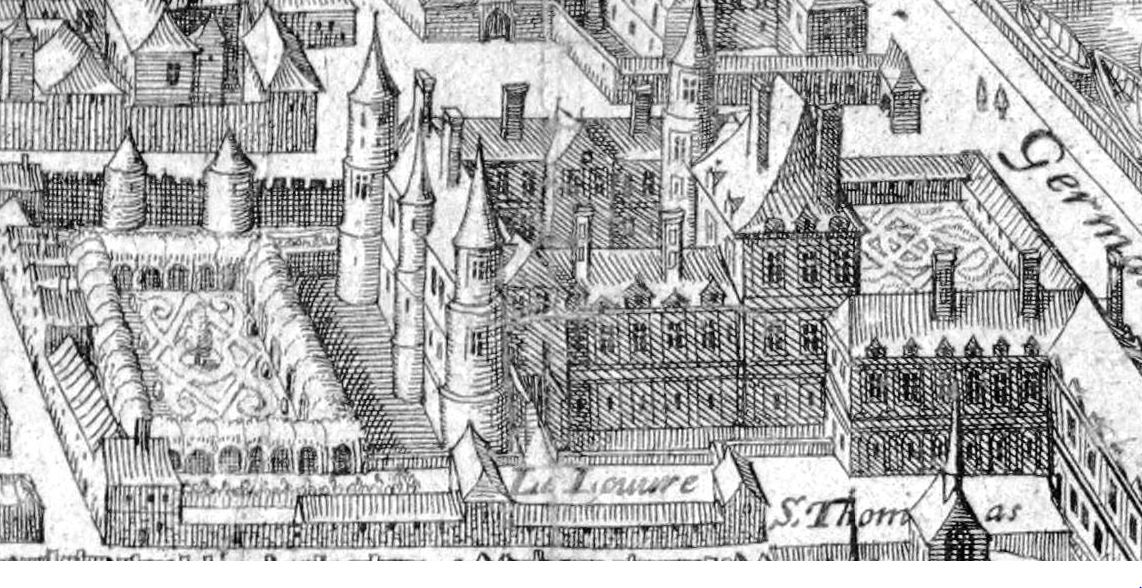
Depiction on Merian map of Paris, 1615

== Plans and reconstructions ==
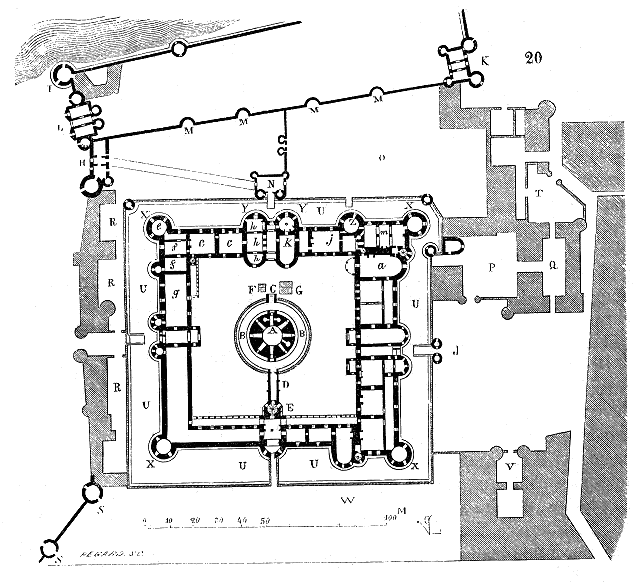
Map of the Louvre under Charles V, by Eugène Viollet-le-Duc (1856; oriented south on top and north at bottom)

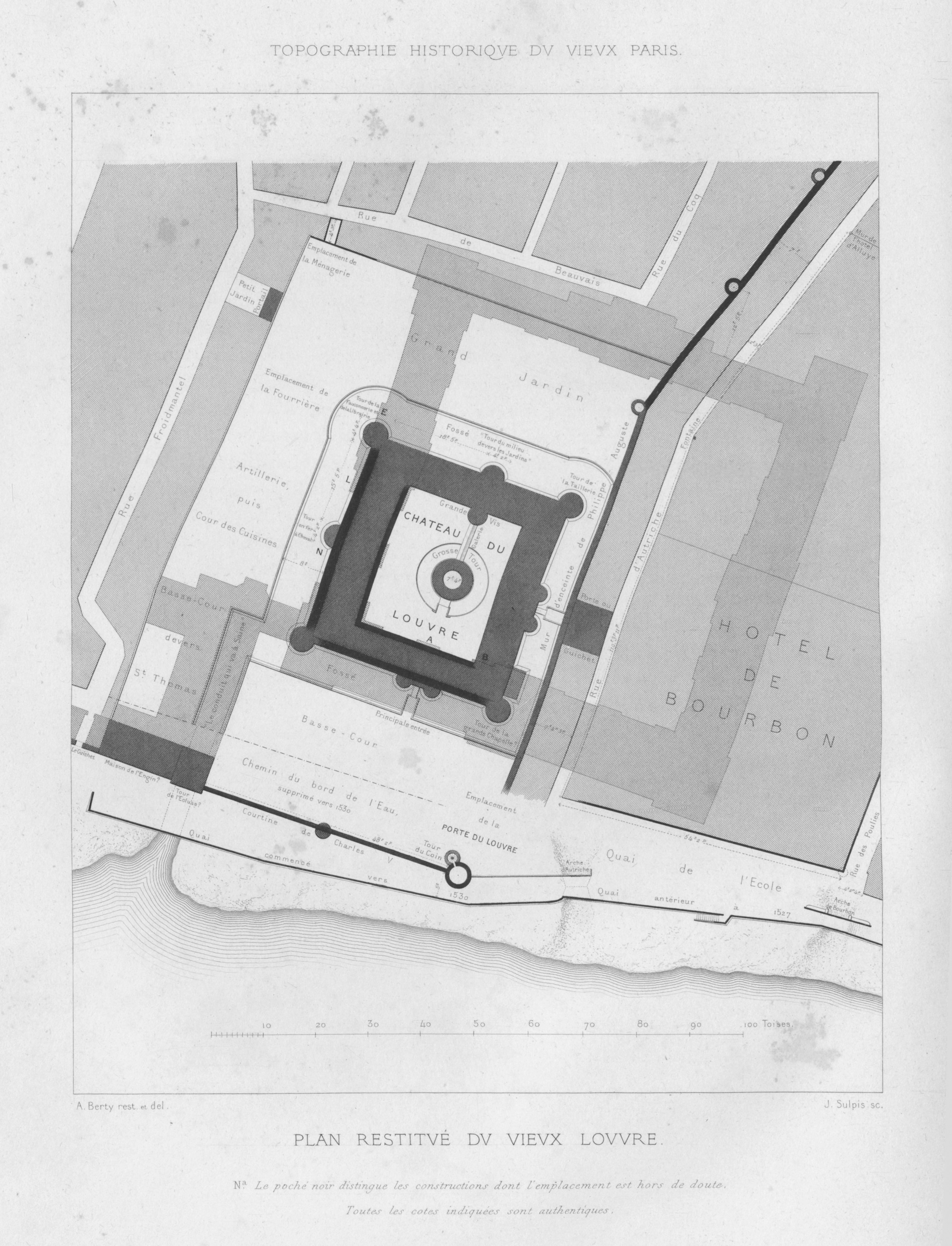
Map of the medieval Louvre, by Adolphe Berty (1866)

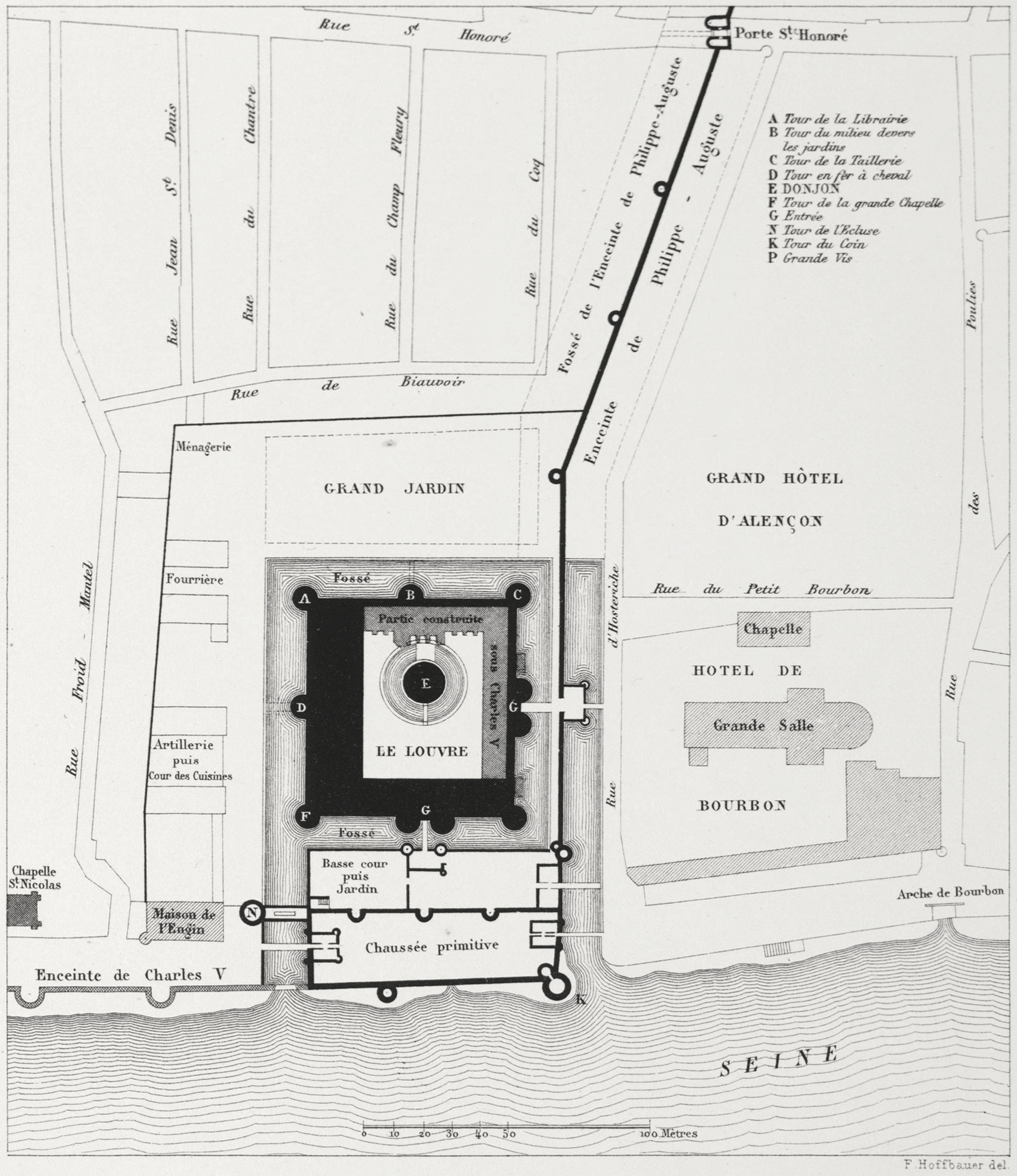
Map of the Louvre in 1380, by Theodor Josef Hubert Hoffbauer (ca.1880)

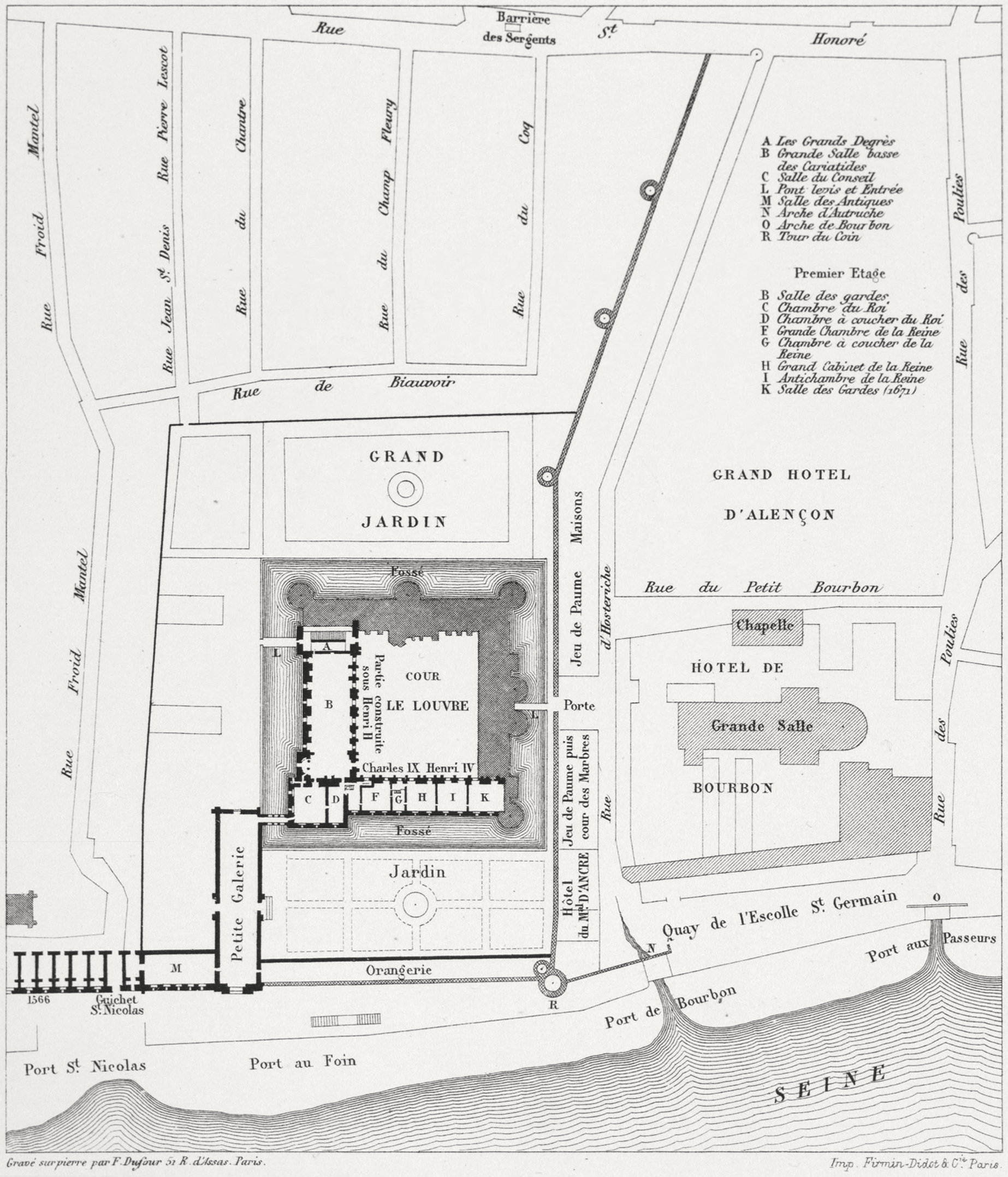
Map of the Louvre in 1595, by Theodor Josef Hubert Hoffbauer (ca.1880)

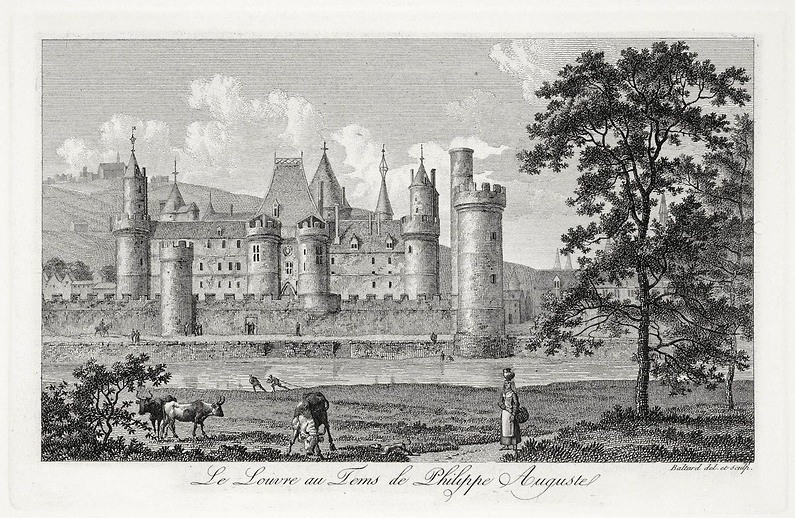
The castle from the south and Seine river around the year 1200, as imagined by Louis-Pierre Baltard around 1800

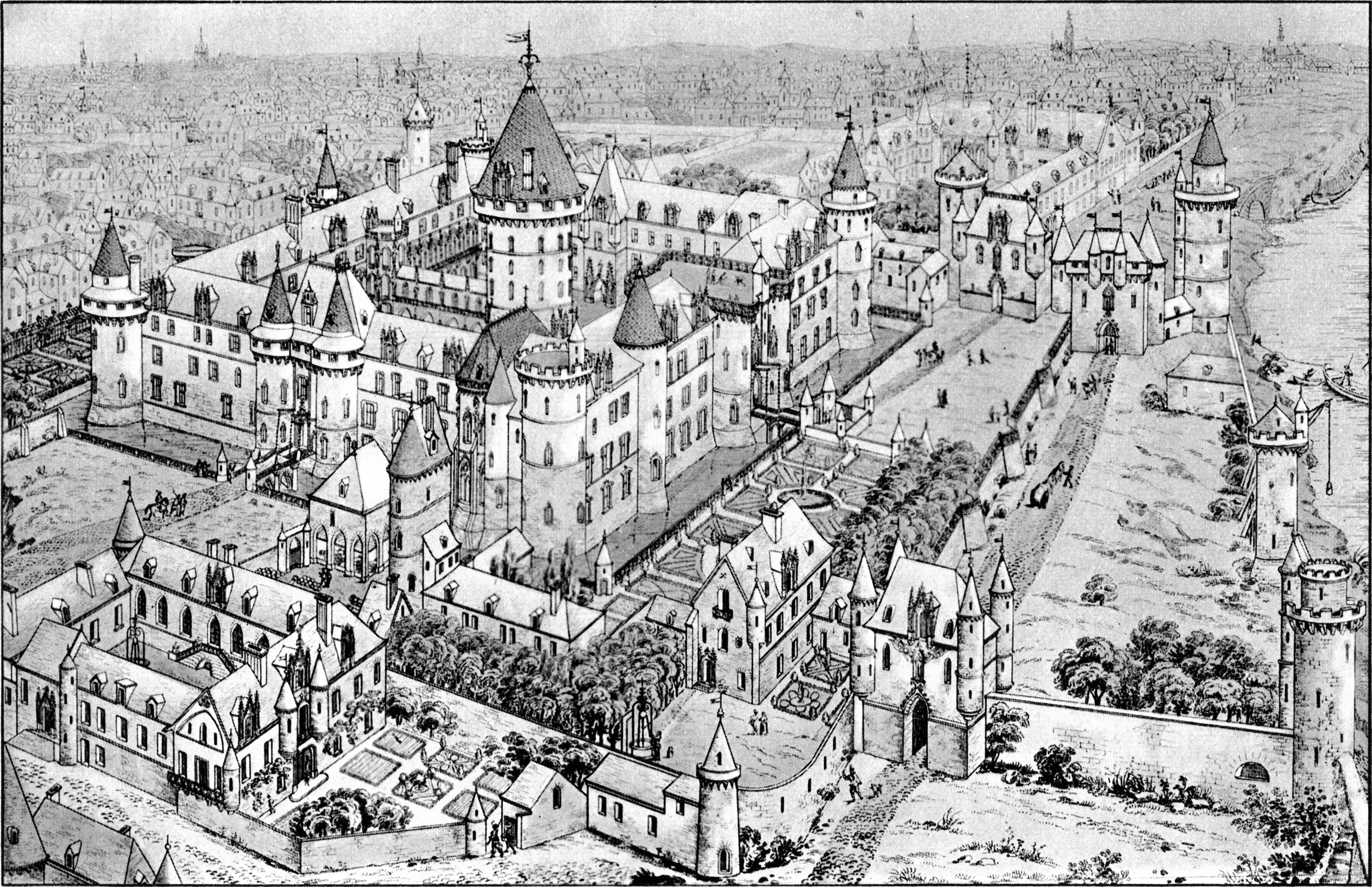
Reconstruction of the medieval Louvre by the Comte de Clarac (1826)

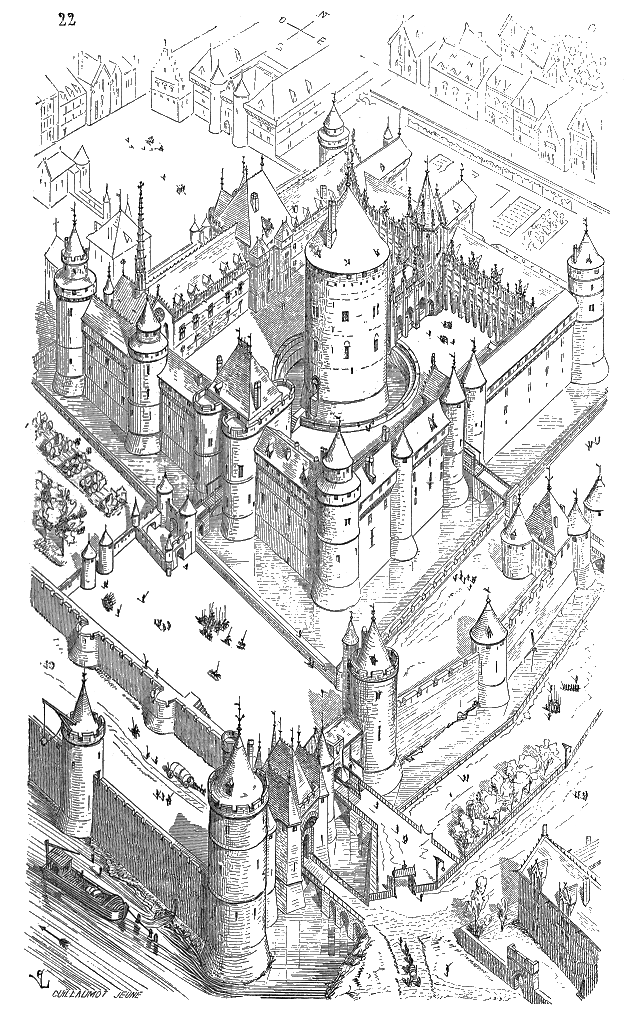
Reconstruction by Eugène Viollet-le-Duc (1856)

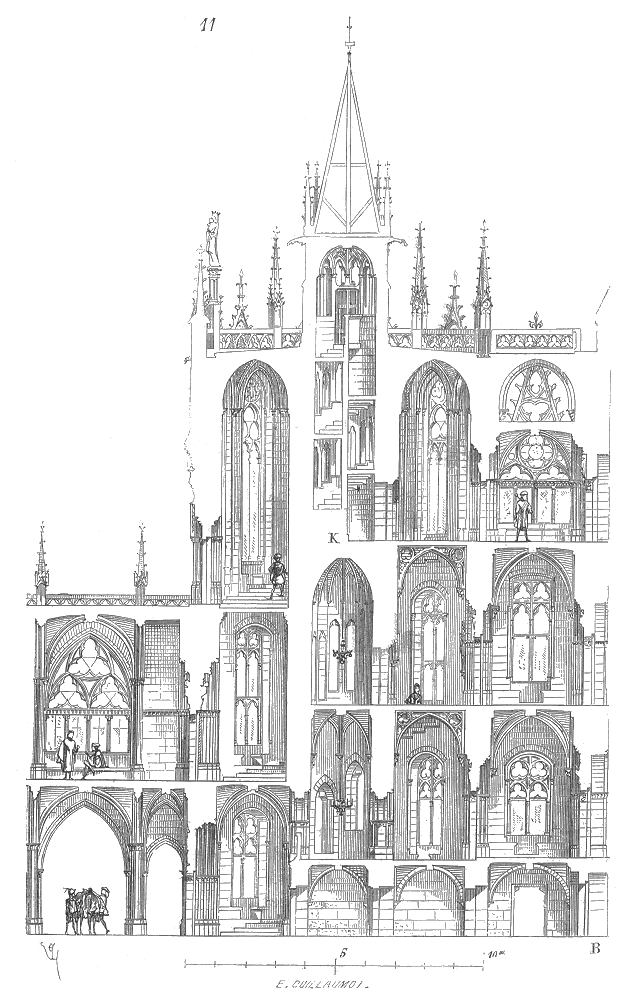
Viollet-le-Duc's reconstructed section of the Grande Vis (1856)

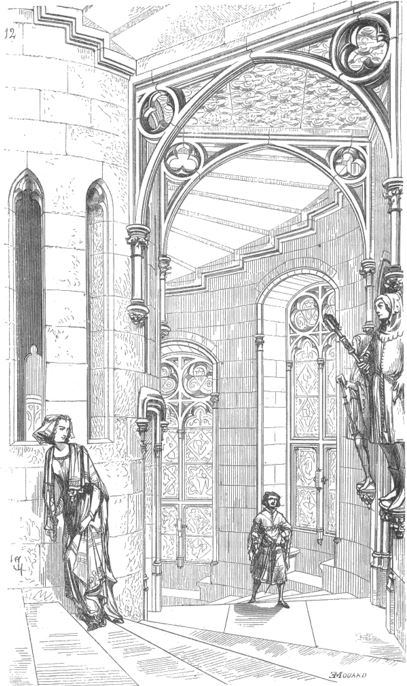
Viollet-le-Duc's reconstruction of the Grande Vis (1856)

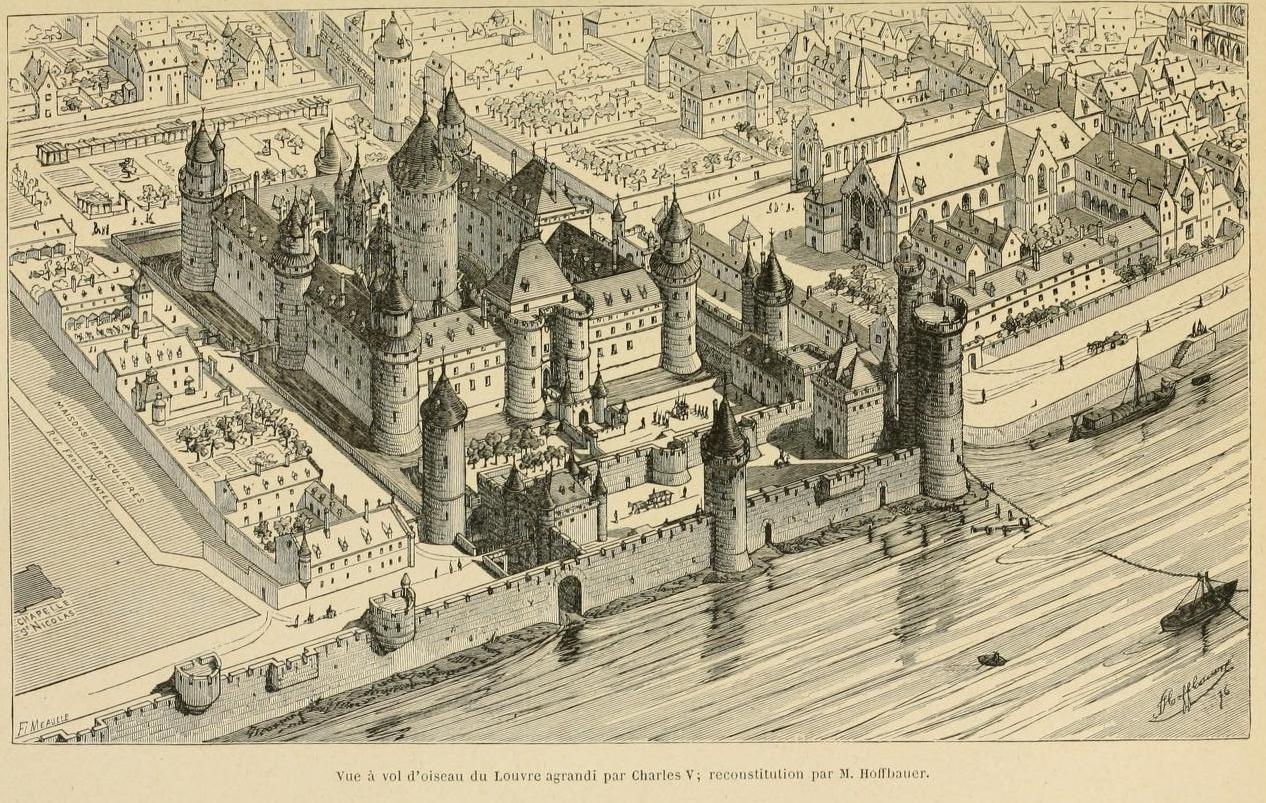
Reconstruction by Theodor Josef Hubert Hoffbauer (ca.1880)

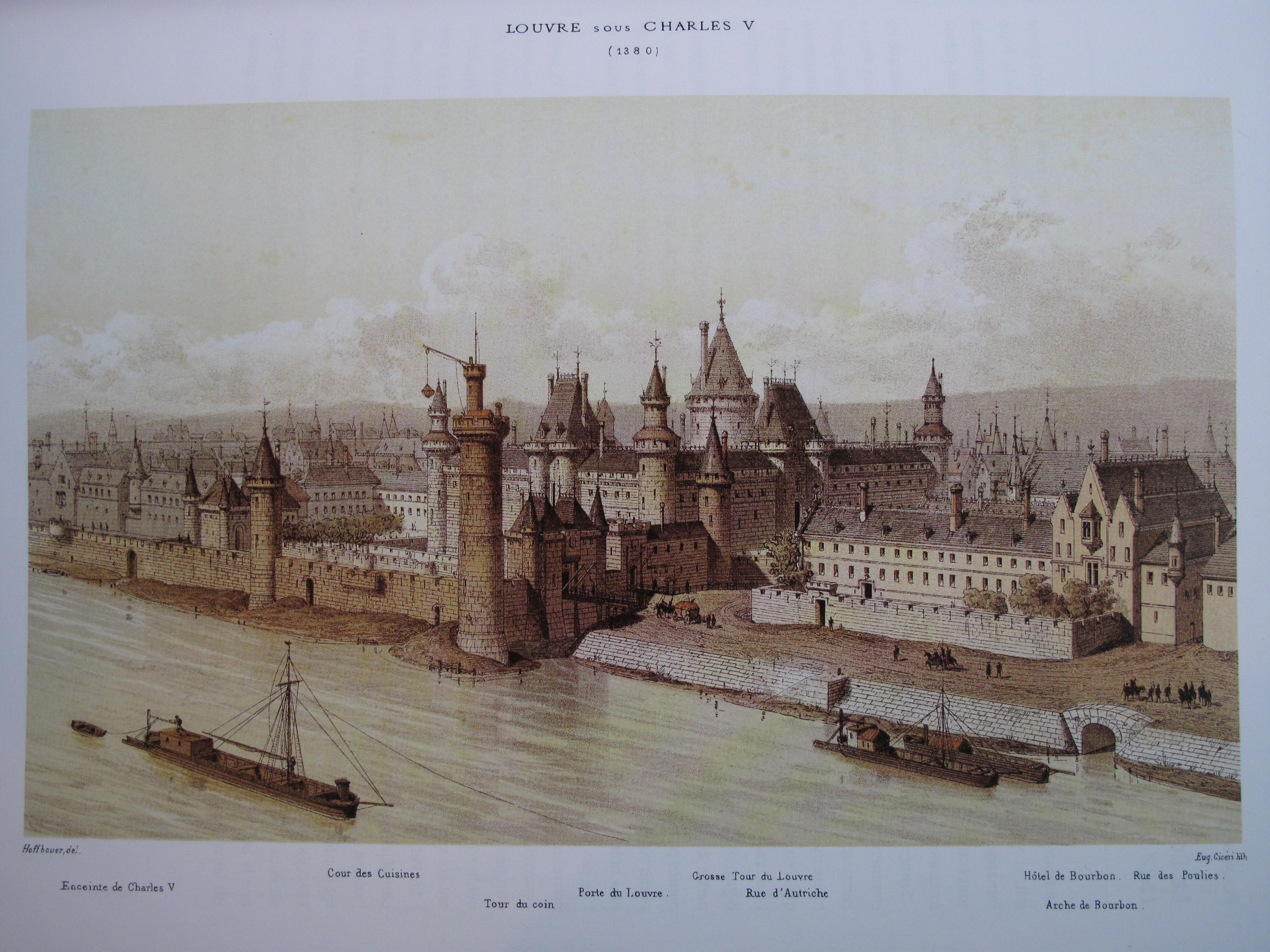
Another view of the Louvre in 1380 as reconstructed by Hoffbauer (ca.1880)

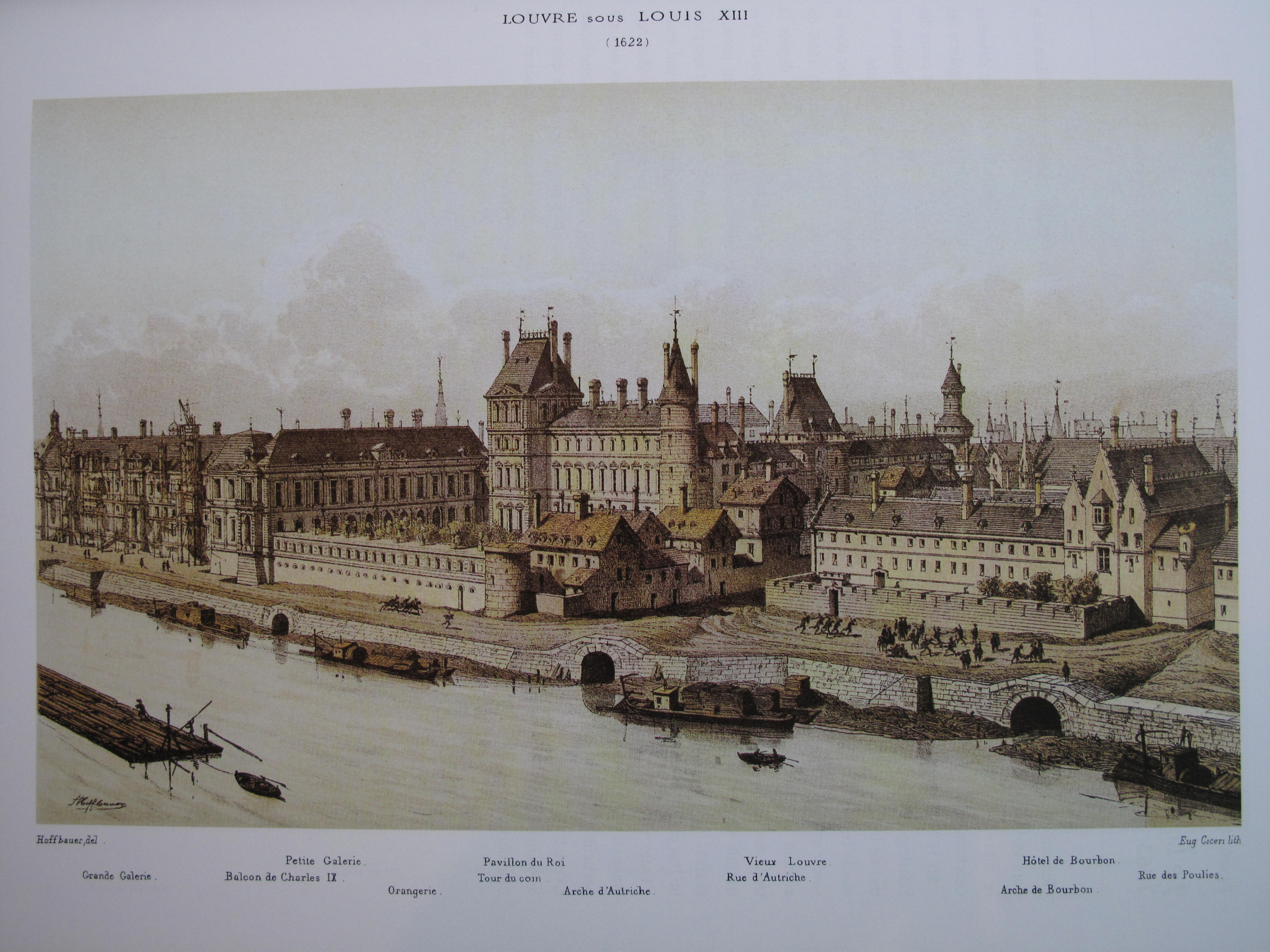
The Louvre in 1622 as reconstructed by Hoffbauer (ca.1880)

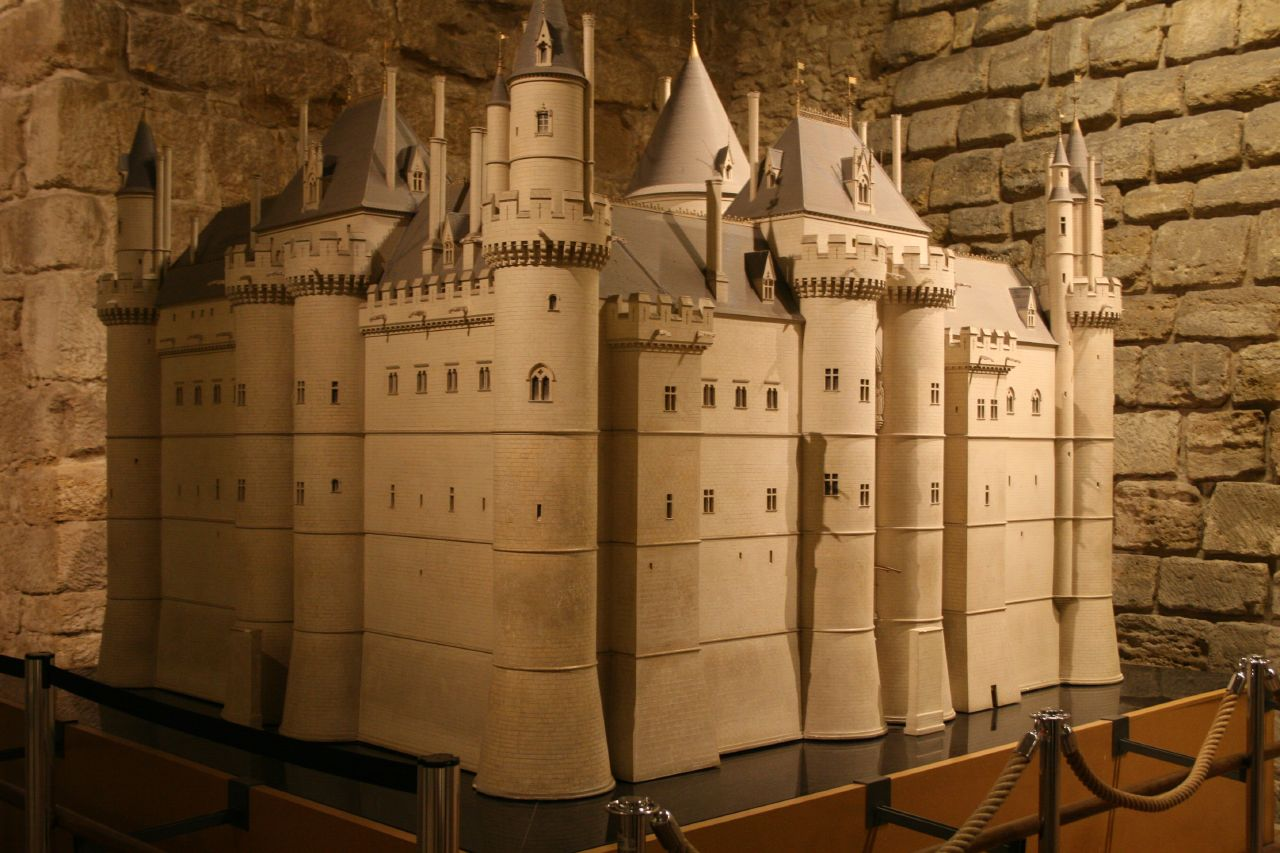
Model of the Louvre after Charles V's transformation, placed in 1989 in the underground spaces displaying the castle's remains

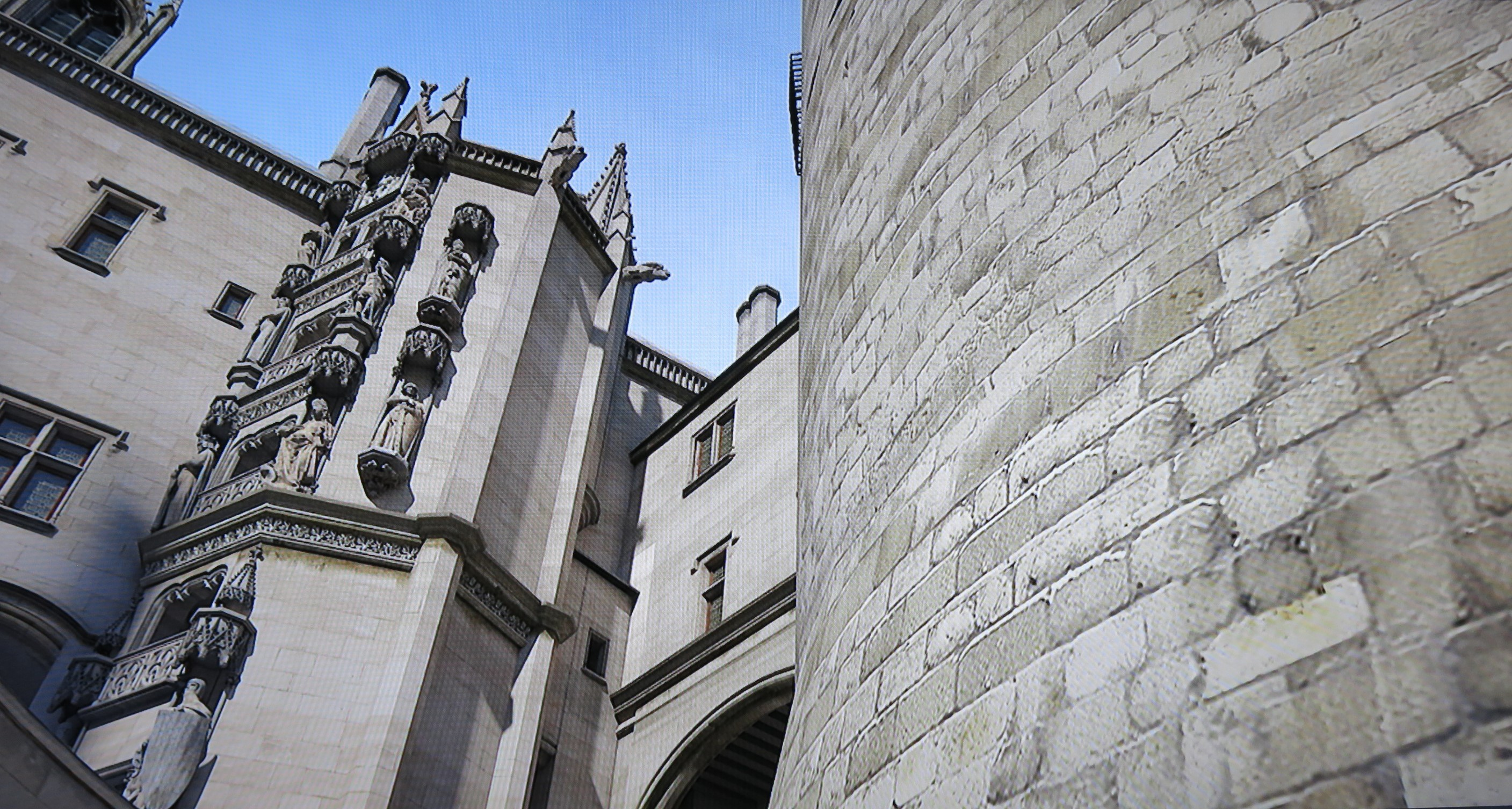
Recent computer model of the Grande Vis

== Excavations and remains ==
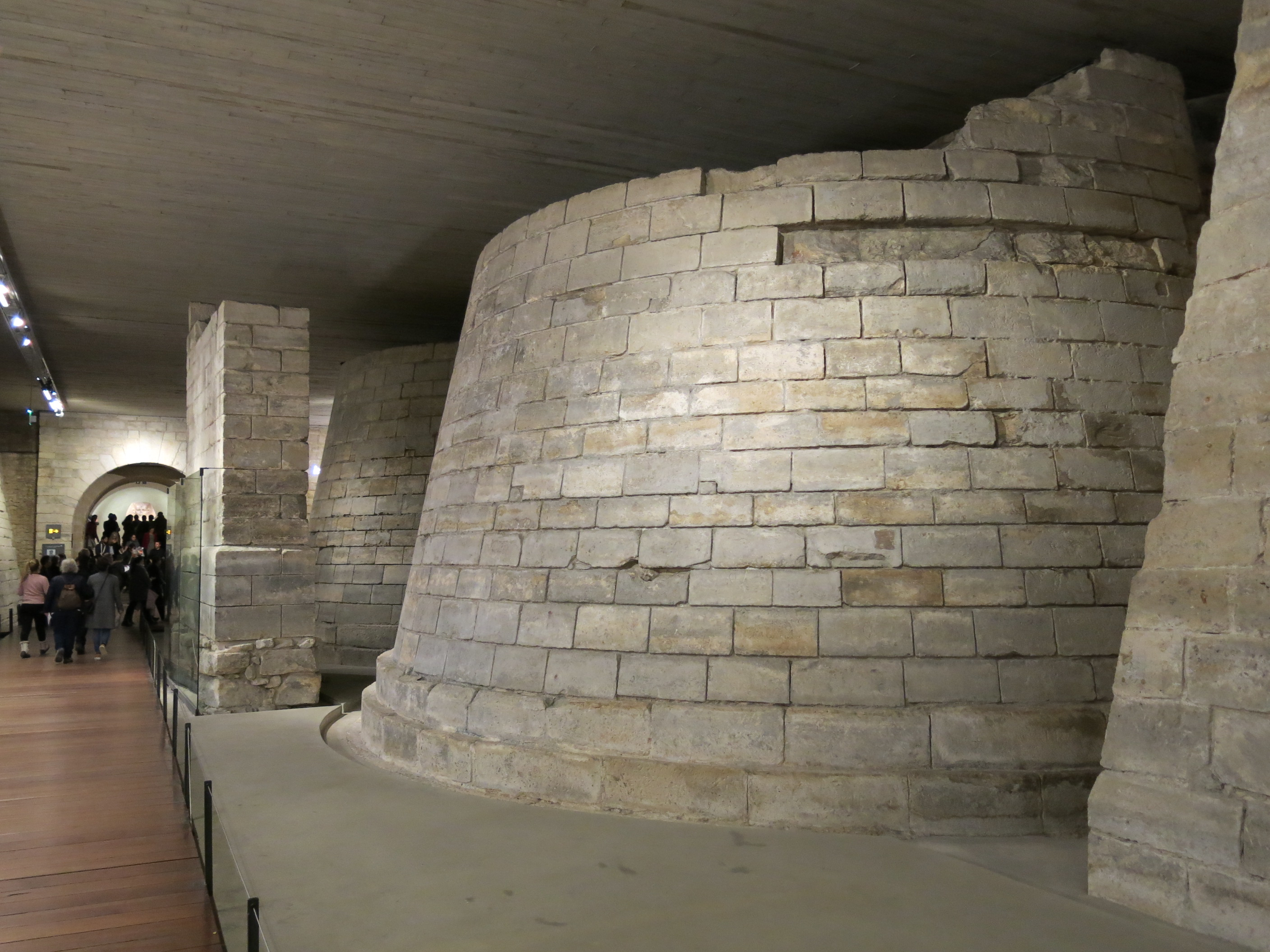
One of the walls of the castle preserved in the Medieval Louvre. This is the wall facing the city with the support pillar of the drawbridge, the main entrance to the Louvre.

During the 19th century, it was found that the dungeon, along with two of the four walls were not completely demolished, but instead the stones from the walls were taken down to fill ditches in preparation for construction of the Louvre Palace.

During the construction of the Louvre Pyramid, the bases of the keep and the two walls were cleared. A major excavation campaign resulted in the discovery of hundreds of everyday life objects. They are now accessible to the public in a collection named Medieval Louvre which features the lower room (today known as the Salle Saint-Louis) and the objects found during the excavations (small games, jugs, flasks, ...).

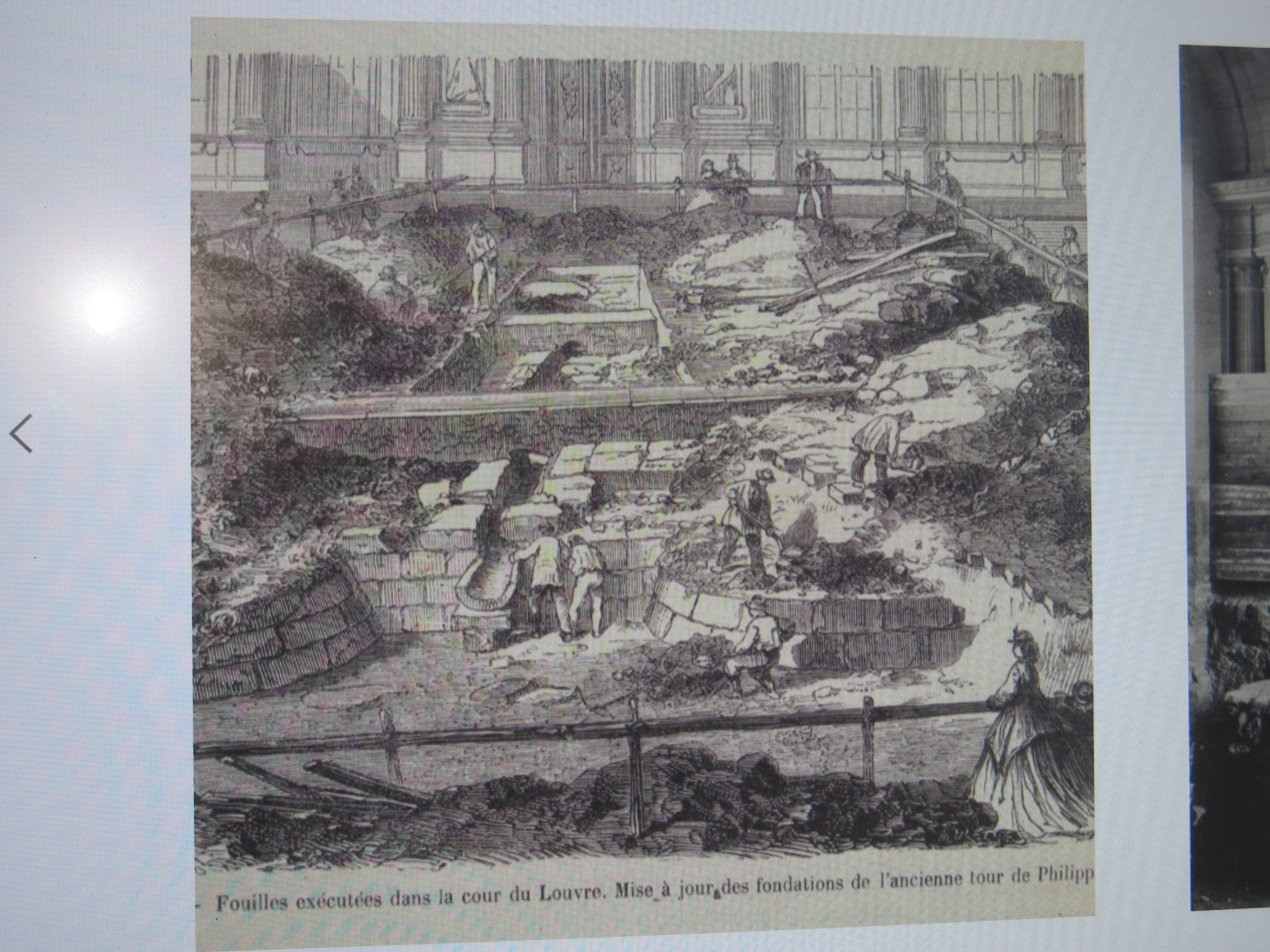
First excavation of the medieval Louvre by Adolphe Berty in 1866

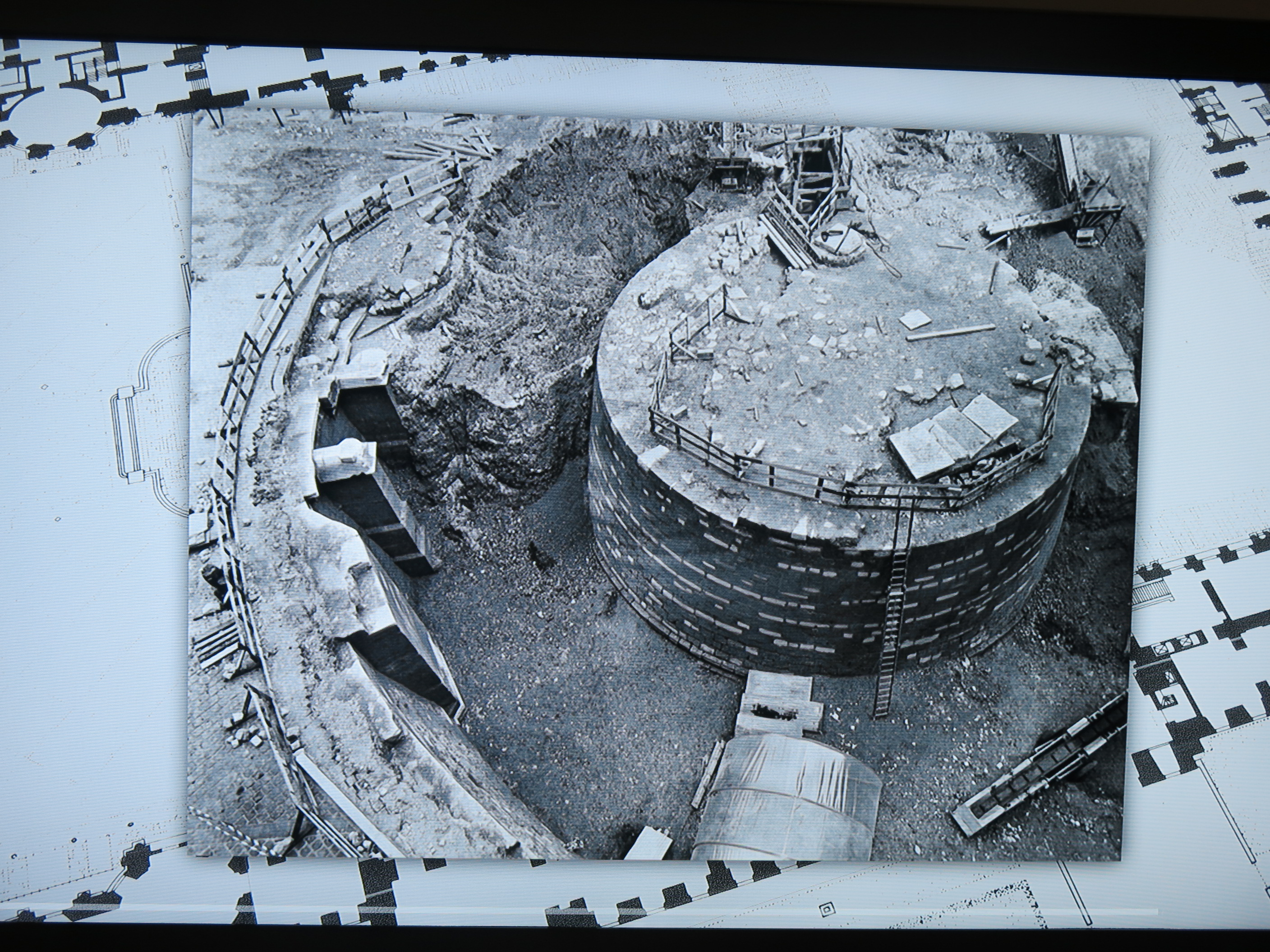
The 1980s excavation of the Louvre's keep

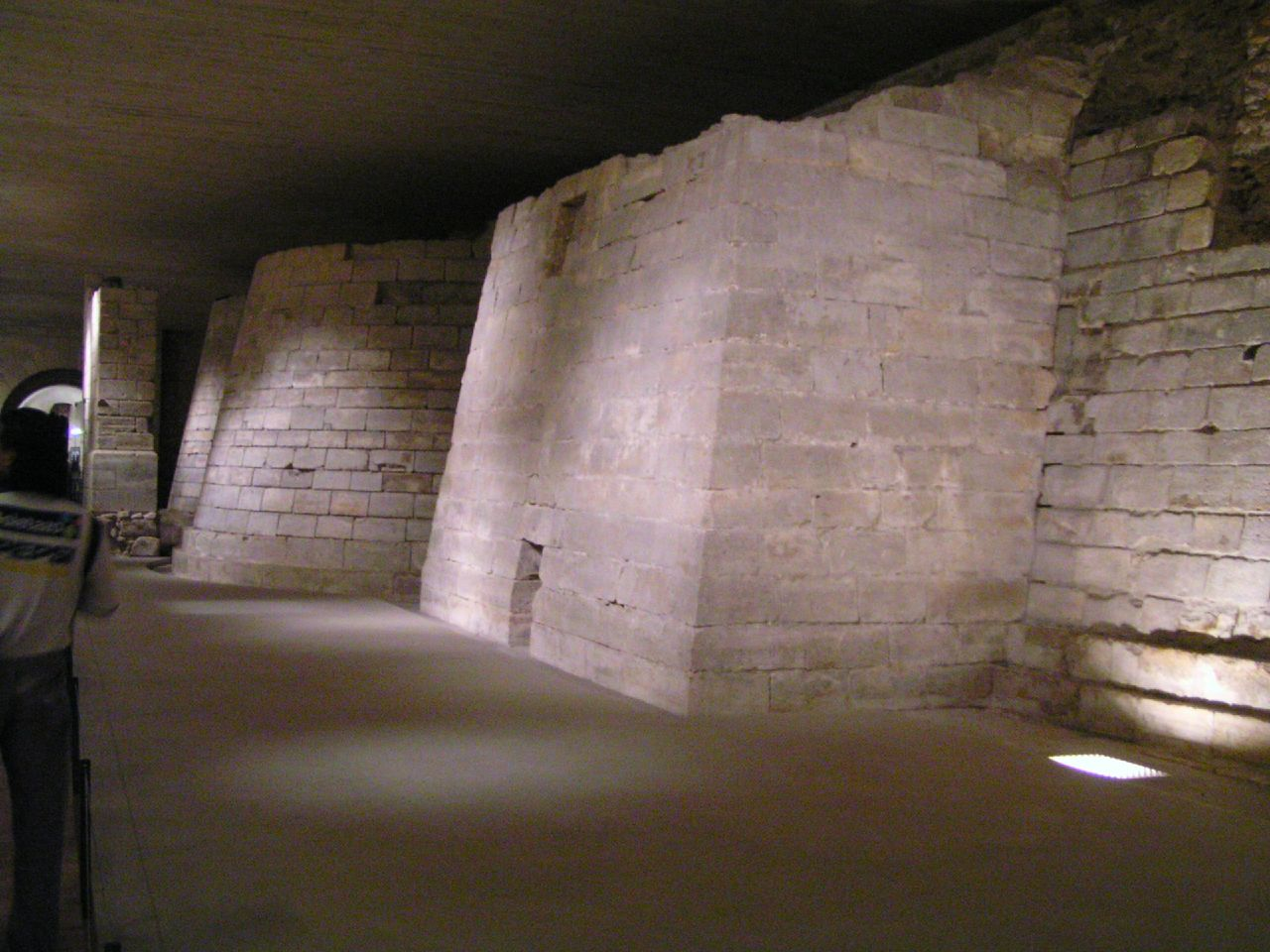
Remains of the Louvre's basement level, restored and opened to the public in the 1980s

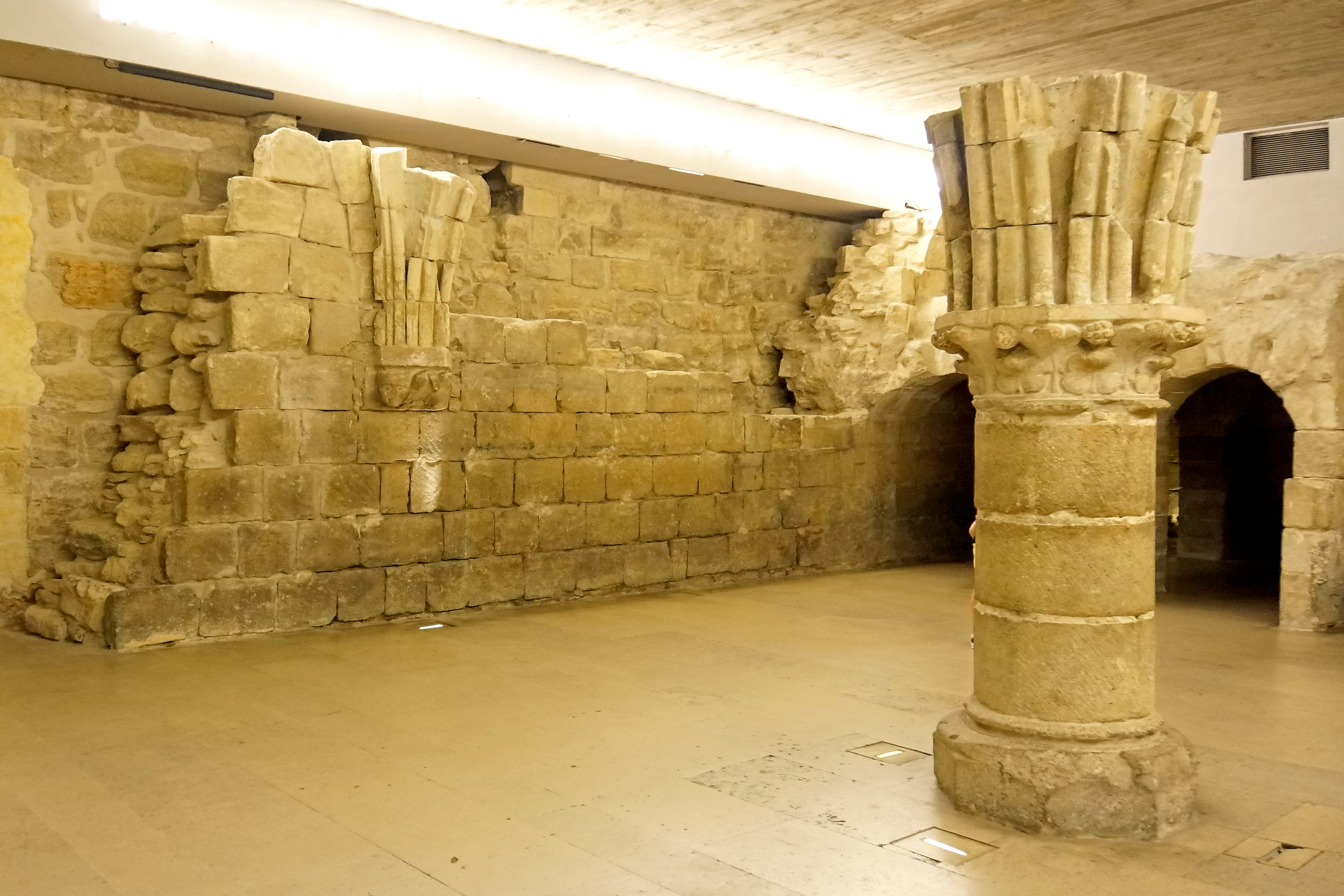
The Salle Saint-Louis photographed in 2014

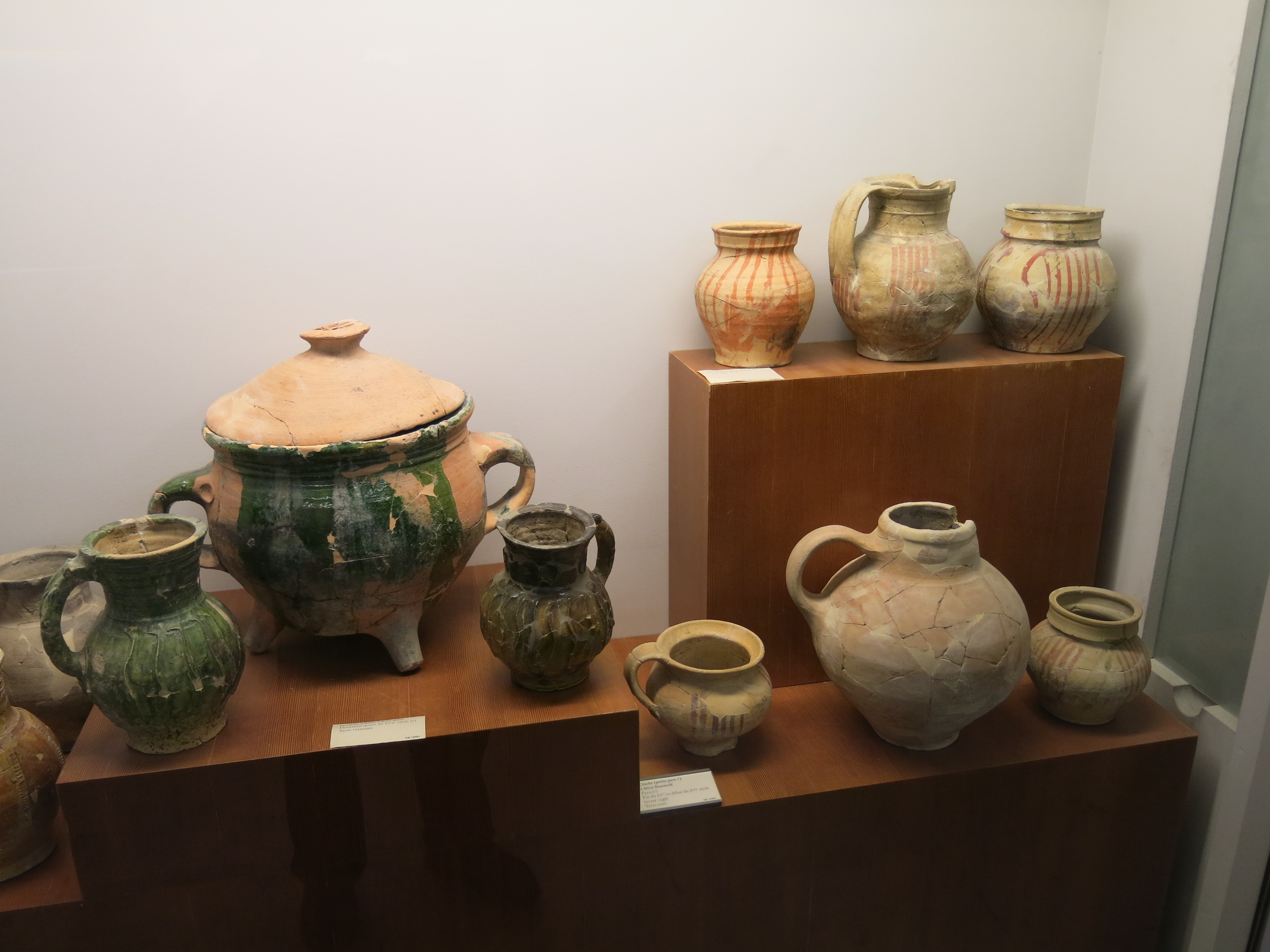
Pottery unearthed during the 1980s excavations

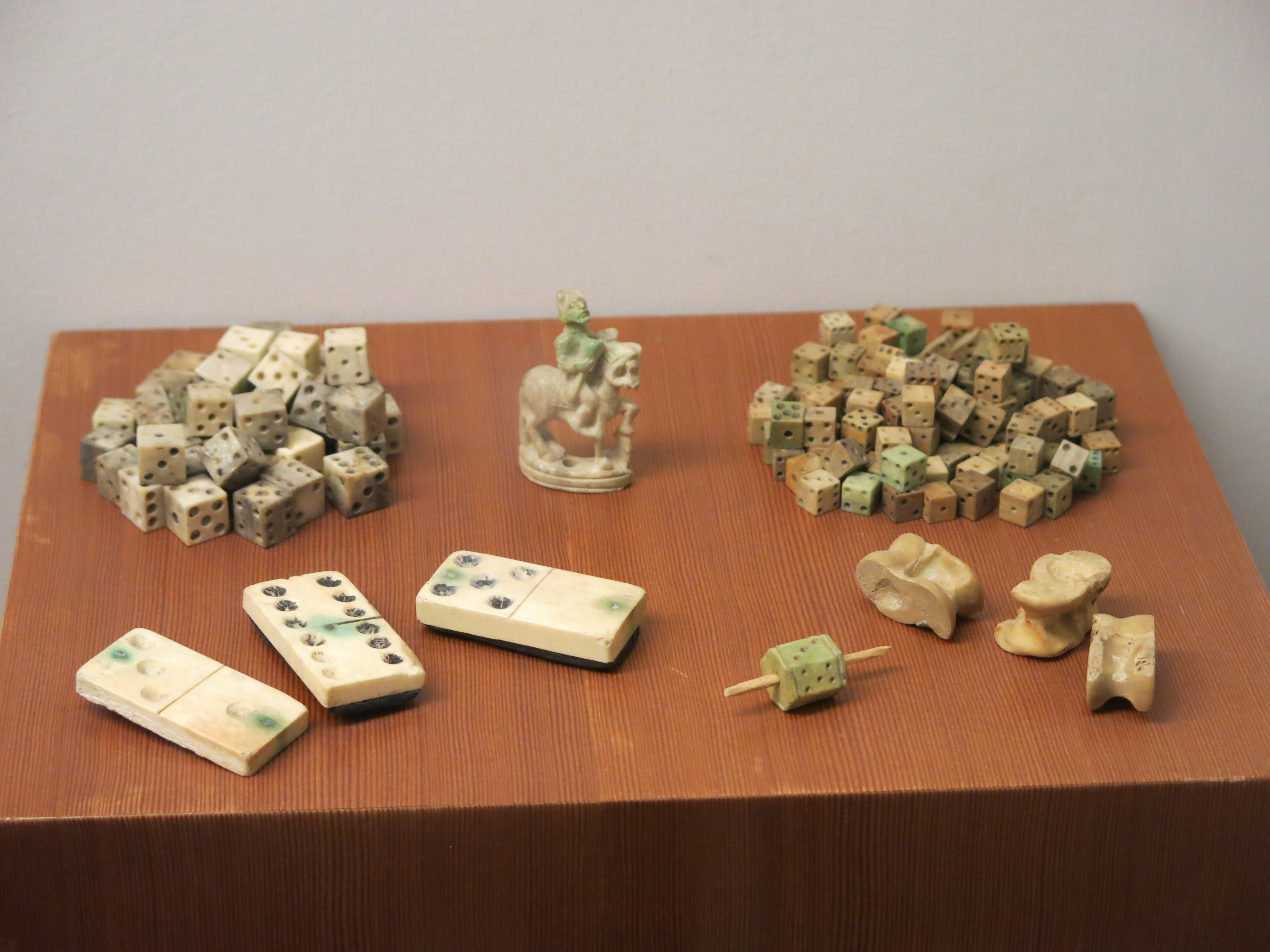
Dominoes, dice and other games

== Bibliography ==
- Christ, Yvan (1949). Le Louvre et les Tuileries: Histoire architecturale d'un double palais. Paris: Éditions "Tel". OCLC 905451047.
- Erlande-Brandenburg, Alain (1996). "Palais du Louvre", vol. 24, p. 161, in The Dictionary of Art, 34 volumes, edited by Jane Turner. New York: Grove. ISBN 9781884446009.
- Hanser, David A. (2006). Architecture of France. Westport, Connecticut: Greenwood Press. ISBN 9780313319020.
- Pérouse de Montclos, Jean-Marie, editor (1994). Le Guide du patrimoine Paris. Paris: Hachette. ISBN 9782010168123. OCLC 1075437769.
