= Claude, Duke of Chevreuse =

French nobleman

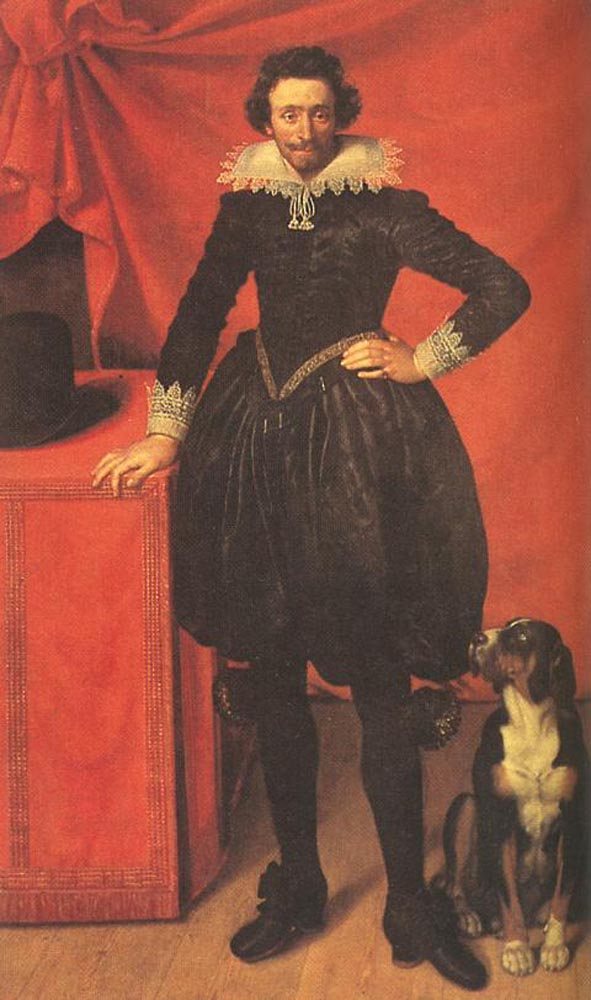
Claude de Guise, Prince de Joinville (1610).

Arms of Claude.

Claude de Lorraine (5 June 1578 – 24 January 1657), also called Claude de Guise, was a French noble and husband of Marie de Rohan. He was the Duke of Chevreuse, a title which is today used by the Duke of Luynes.

== Biography ==
He was the third son of Henry I, Duke of Guise and Catherine de Clèves. First known as the Prince of Joinville, he was made Duke of Chevreuse and peer of France by Louis XIII in 1611, Grand Chamberlain of France in 1621, and Grand Falconer of France in 1622.

Claude visited England in May and June 1607, and was welcomed by the court of James VI and I. The visit is said to have been prompted by his affair with Jacqueline de Bueil, a mistress of Henry IV of France.

The French ambassador Antoine Lefèvre de la Boderie described his reception in England. Claude was entertained by Anne of Denmark with a musical evening on the Thames by Greenwich Palace. On another day, there was a tournament. A feast and a play, The Tragedy of Aeneas and Dido, was hosted and produced by the Earl of Arundel. Claude visited Prince Henry and gave him a pair of horses. He also gave the Prince a diamond ring and Anne of Demark a huge pearl for an earring. New linen was bought to dress the cupboards of estate of the Banqueting House at Whitehall Palace. After his return to France, Claude sent Prince Henry a suit of armour, which survives in the Royal Collection.

Claude's visit to Theobalds on 22 May 1607 was included in the script of the entertainment by Ben Jonson. James gave him jewels made by Abraham der Kinderen and Philip Jacobson, which were presented to Claude by James Hay, 1st Earl of Carlisle. English records refer to him as the "Prince de Joinville, brother of the Duke of Guise".

Chevreuse stood as proxy for Charles I of England in his marriage at Notre Dame to Henrietta Maria on 1 May 1625.' He hosted the Duke of Buckingham, who came to escort Henrietta to England, at the Hôtel de Chevreuse. The Duke and Duchess of Chevreuse accompanied Henrietta Maria to England. After their return to France, on 13 December 1625, Charles I made him a Knight in the Order of the Garter.

== Marriage and issue ==
In 1622, he married Princess Marie de Rohan, who was 22 years younger than himself.
They had 3 daughters:

- Anne Marie de Lorraine (1624–1652), abbesse of Pont-aux-Dames.
- Charlotte Marie de Lorraine (1627–1652), Mademoiselle de Chevreuse, lover of Jean François Paul de Gondi, cardinal de Retz.
- Henriette de Lorraine (1631–1693), abbesse of Jouarre.

He lived with his family in the Château de Dampierre, near Chevreuse.

He commissioned the royal architect, Clément Métezeau, to design a Parisian townhouse, the Hôtel de Chevreuse, constructed 1622–1623 on the Rue Saint-Thomas-du-Louvre on a site now part of the Cour Napoléon of the Louvre.

Living an inconspicuous life, Claude succeeded in distancing himself from his wife's plotting (as a favorite of Queen Anne of Austria she was involved in many political intrigues at the court of King Louis XIII).

He died without a male heir in 1657.
