= Abraham der Kinderen =

London-based Dutch goldsmith, active 1600–1620

Abraham der Kinderen was a London goldsmith who supplied jewels to the royal family.

He was a member of the Dutch Church in London, a "merchant stranger". His wife Lucretia was English, and in 1617 they lived in Aldgate street with their two children. The registers of St Dionis Backchurch include the burial of three children of "Abraham Derkinder stranger" in October 1606.

He was active between 1600 and 1620. He supplied jewels costing £192 to the Earl of Hertford in 1605 for diplomatic gifts.

In May 1607 he supplied a ring valued at £2000 as King James' gift to the Prince Joinville, brother of the Duke of Guise, who was visiting England. In January 1608 Abraham der Kinderen, Humphrey Fludd, and others were paid for jewels and pearls supplied for New Year's gifts distributed by Anne of Denmark, Princess Elizabeth, and Prince Charles, Duke of York.

This Humphrey Fludd is known for supplying a jewel-studded clock to King James in 1607. Another man of the same name, a trumpeter at court, was involved in the Bellott v Mountjoy case.

Lord Hertford bought jewels from Abraham de Kinderen, John Spilman, Abraham Harderet, and Peter Vanlore to take on his embassy to Brussels in 1605.

Arbella Stuart was a prisoner in the Tower of London in 1613. She expected to be released to attend the marriage of Princess Elizabeth in February 1613 and bought pearls and a gown embroidered with pearls to wear from Abraham der Kinderen. Arbella was not invited and pawned and sold most of the pearls for funds a few months later. Abraham der Kinderen petitioned for the return of the pearl embroidered gown after her death.
