= Topographia Galliae =

Illustrated book on 17th-century French towns

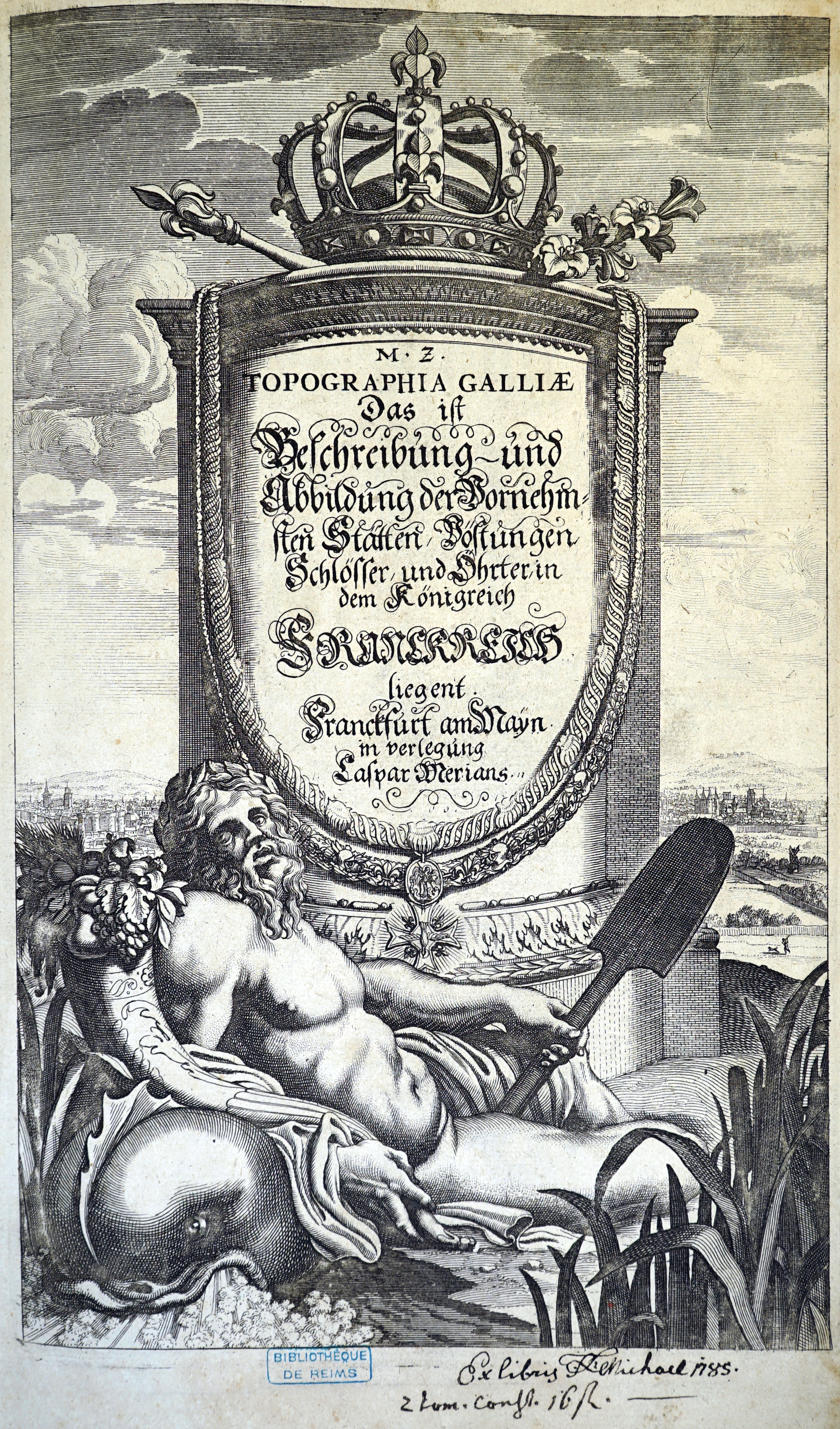
Engraved title page of first volume, Topographia Galliae, 1655

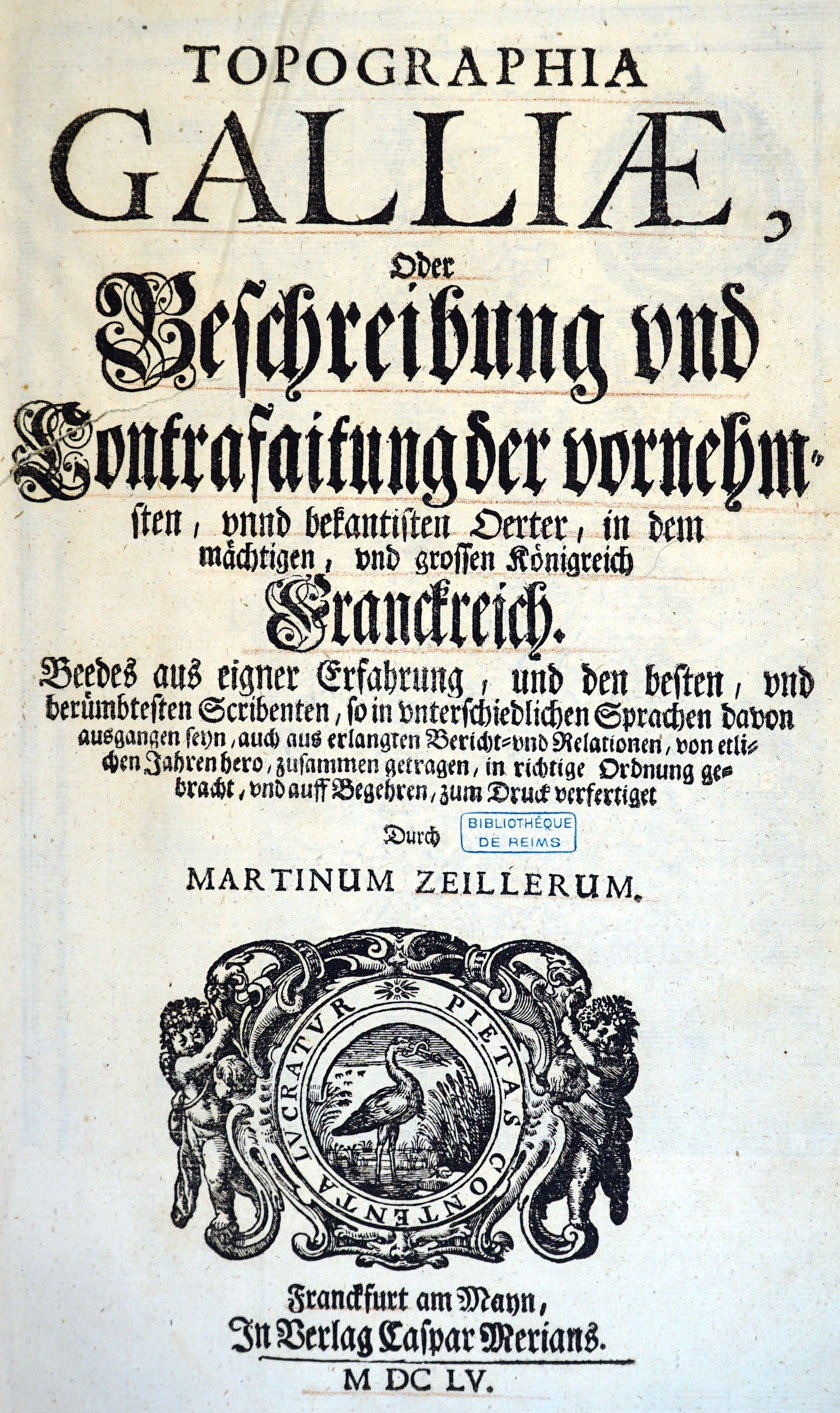
Titel

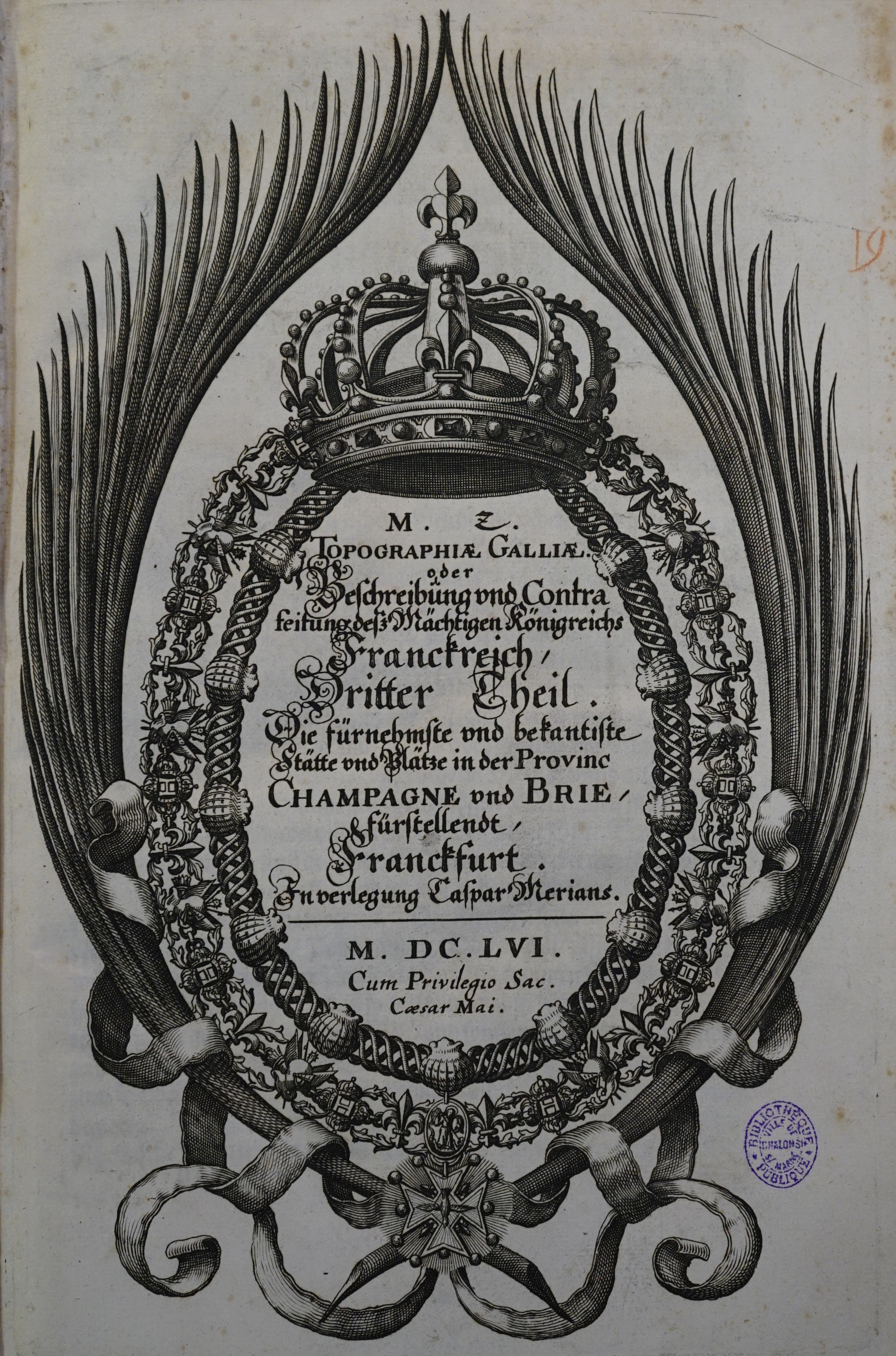
Champagne

Topographia Galliae (1655–1661) is a German-language series of illustrated books created by engraver Matthäus Merian and writer Martin Zeiler, and published in Frankfurt. It describes cities and towns in 17th-century France. Wenceslaus Hollar also contributed to its engravings.

== Volumes ==
- Topographia Galliae (in German and Latin) (1st ed.), Frankfurt: Caspar Merian 1655- (13 volumes)
  - Topographia Galliae. Vol. 1. 1655 – via Bayerische Staatsbibliothek.; via Google Books
    - Contents: Paris, Île-de-France; index
  - Die fürnehmste und bekantiste Stätte und Plätze in der Provinc Picardiae. Vol. 2. 1656.
    - Contents: Picardy province; index
- Topographia Galliae (in German) (2nd ed.). Frankfurt: Caspar Merian. 1655–1661 – via Rhineland-Palatinate Dilibri.
  - Die fürnehmste und bekandiste Stätte und Plätze in der Provinc Champagne und Brie. Vol. 3. 1656.
  - Die fürnehmste vnd bekantiste Stätte vnd Plätze von Burgund Bresse. Nivernois vnd Dombes. Vol. 4. 1656.
  - Die fürnehmste vnd bekantiste Stätte vnd Plätze in den Ländern. Lyonnois. Forests. Beaviolois, vnd Bovrbonnois. Vol. 5. 1657.
    - Contents: Lyon
  - Die fürnehmste vnd bekantiste Stätte, vndt Plätze in den Ländern. Berry, Avergne. vnd Limosin. Vol. 6. 1657.
  - Die fürnehmste vnd bekantiste Stätte vnd Plätze in der Provinc Beavsse, Chartrain. l Angov le Maine. le Perche. Vandosme. le Blaisois. Dvnois. la Tovraine. l'Orleanois. Poictov. l'Avnis. vnd l'Angovmois, Abhandlent. Vol. 7. 1657.
    - Contents: Chartres, Orléans, etc.; index
  - Die fürnehmste vnd bekantiste Stätte vnd Plätze in dem Hertzogthumb Normandie. Vol. 8. 1657.
  - Der Oerter Beschreibung in dem Hochlöblichen Königreich Franckreich/ Der Neundte Theil. Darinn Von dem Hertzogthum Bretaigne, oder dem Kleinern Britannien, in Franckreich gelegen. Vol. 9. 1661.
  - Die fürnehmste und bekannteste Städte und Plätze in Guienne, Guascoigne, Saintonge, Bearn, und andern herumbligenden/ als/ Perigord, l'Agenois, &c. Vol. 10. 1661.
    - Contents: Bayonne, Bordeaux, etc.; index
  - Die fürnehmste und bekanteste Stätte und Plätze in Languedoc, Albigeois, Foix, Giuaudan, Lauraguez, Velay, Vivarez, Quercy, und Roüergue. Vol. 11. 1661.
    - Contents: Montpelier, Toulouse, etc.
  - Die Provantz, oder la Provence, sambt der anstossenden Graffschafft Venaiscin, Venissy, oder d'Avignon, und das Fürstenthumb von Oranges. Vol. 12. 1661.
    - Contents: Avignon, etc.
  - Das Land Dauphiné, oder das Delphinat. Vol. 13. 1661.
    - Contents: Grenoble, etc.

== See also ==
- Merian map of Paris
