= Adolphe Berty =

French historian and architect

- Born: Adolphe Eugène Étienne Berty; 13 May 1818; Paris
- Died: 18 August 1867 (aged 49); Paris
- Occupations: Architect; Archaeologist; Historiographer

Adolphe Berty (also known as Boulet; 13 May 1818, Paris – 18 August 1867, Paris) was a historiographer, archaeologist, historian of architecture, and French architect.

Berty was the founder of Parisian topography; he was also responsible for important work on the historiography of Paris. One of his main works is the Topographie historique du vieux Paris
