= Brûlart family =

Brûlart dynasty of French origin

- Country: Kingdom of France
- Titles: Marquis of Sillery; Marquis of Genlis; Marquis of La Borde; Marquis of Puisieulx; Viscount of Puisieulx; Viscount of Ludes; Baron of Boursault; Baron of Grand-Pressigny
- Cadet branches: Sillery; La Borde; Genlis

The Brûlart family was a family of the French nobility that was established in Paris, in the service of the Kings of France, which then relocated to Burgundy. It is said to have originated from Saint-Martin-d'Ablois, the Marne department in Champagne. The Brûlart family died out in 1793 upon the extinction of the Genlis branch.

== History ==
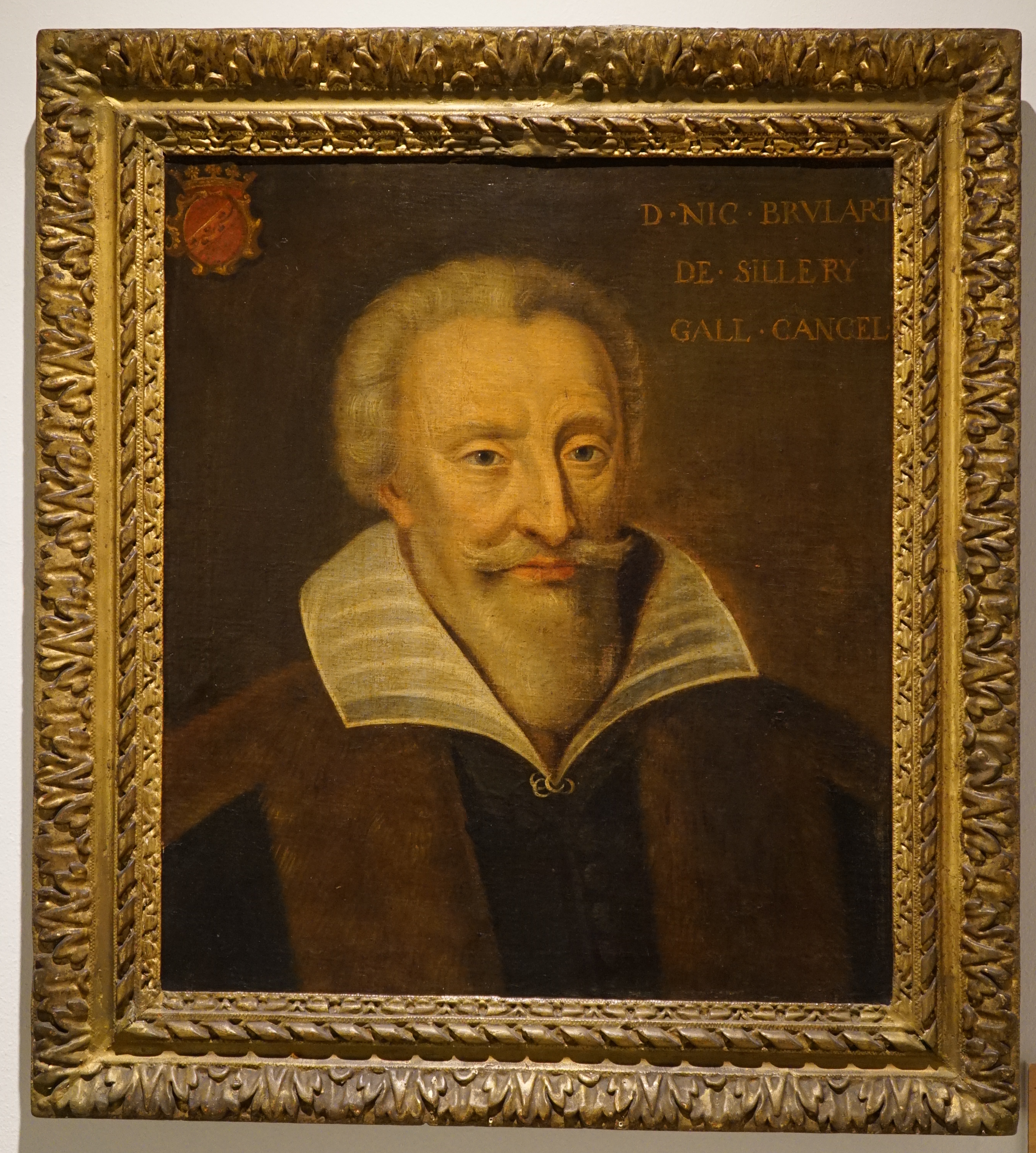
Nicolas Brûlart de Sillery

The Brûlart family, formed three main branches:

- Elder branch of the Lords of Sillery, land created into a marquisate by Henry IV, extinct in 1770.
- Younger branch of the Lords of La Borde, including Marie Brûlart de La Borde, lady-in-waiting to Marie Leszczyńska, extinct after 1738.
- Younger branch of the Lords of Genlis, extinct in 1793.

== Prominent members ==
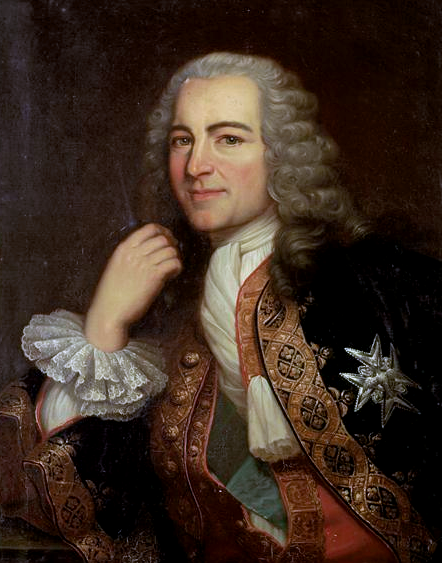
Louis Philogène Brûlart, by Louis Joseph Toussaint Rossignon

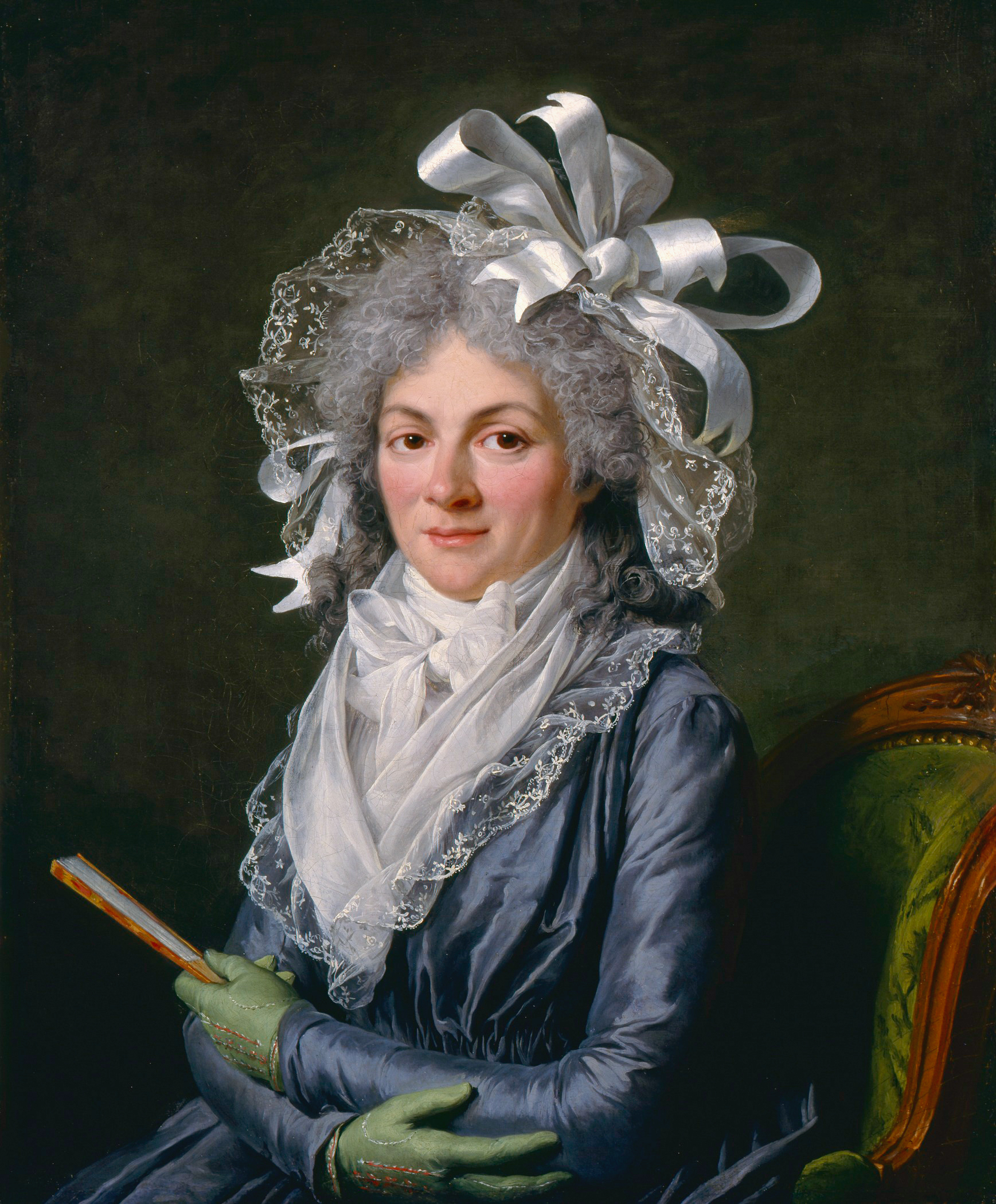
Madame de Genlis, by Adélaïde Labille-Guiard, 1790

- Pierre Brûlart, seigneur de Genlis (c. 1535–1608), a statesman and secretary of state.
- Nicolas Brûlart de Sillery (1544–1624), diplomat, Keeper of the Seals and Chancellor of France.
- Noël Brûlart de Sillery (1577–1640), a diplomat who became a priest and used his fortune to establish a mission in New France.
- Pierre Brûlart, marquis de Sillery (1583–1640), minister of foreign affairs.
- Louis Roger Brûlart de Sillery (1619–1691), governor of the Duke of Chartres.
- Fabio Brulart de Sillery (1655–1714), Bishop of Avranches and Bishop of Soissons.
- Marie Brûlart (c. 1684–1763), a courtier, close friend and confidante to the queen consort, Marie Leszczyńska.
- Louis Philogène Brûlart, vicomte de Puisieulx (1702–1770), a diplomat who served as foreign minister.
- Charles Alexis Brûlart de Sillery (1737–1793), deputy to the National Convention.
- Stéphanie Félicité, comtesse de Genlis (1746–1830), a writer of novels and theories of children's education.
- Pamela Brûlart de Sillery (c. 1777–1831), illegitimate daughter of Philippe d'Orléans and Félicité de Genlis.

== Family tree ==
- Pierre I Brûlart (c. 1422–1483) m. Denise Dourdin (d. 1466)
  - Jean Brûlart (c. 1456–1519) m. Jeanne Jayer (d. 1505)
    - Jacques Brûlart, Lord of Heez and Aignets m. Isabelle-Antoinette Le Picart
      - Jeanne Brûlart, m. Pierre Hennequin d'Ecquevilly and Boinville
    - Pierre II Brûlart (1484–1541) m. Ambroise Regnault de Montmort de Berny
      - Elder branch, called Sillery
    - Noël Brûlart (1486–1557), Lord of Crosne m. Isabeau Bourdin (d. 1589)
      - Denis I Brûlart de La Borde (1532–1611) m. Madeleine Hennequin
        - Younger branch, called La Borde
      - Pierre Brûlart de Genlis (1535–1608) m. Madeleine Chevalier
        - Younger branch, called Genlis
      - Nicolas II Brûlart de Crosne (d. 1597)
      - Marguerite Brûlart m. Louis Alleaume
      - Ambrosia Brûlart m. Raoul Avrillot de Champlâtreux (uncle of the Marie of the Incarnation)
      - Madeleine Brûlart m. Thierry Cauchon de Condé (his brother, Laurent Cauchon, m. Anne Brûlart, daughter of Pierre III Brûlart de Sillery)
    - Catherine Brûlart m. 1518: Louis de Longueil, Lord of Chèvreville and Bou

=== Elder branch, called Sillery ===
- Pierre II Brûlart (1484–1541) m. Ambroise Regnault de Montmort de Berny
  - Pierre III Brûlart de Berny (d. 1584) m. 1543: Marie Cauchon, Lady of Sillery and of Puisieulx
    - Nicolas Brûlart de Sillery (1544–1624), 1st Marquis of Sillery, Viscount of Puisieulx and of Ludes, Baron of Boursault, Lord of Génicourt, Marines and Bréançon, m. 1574: Claude Prudhomme
      - Pierre IV Brûlart de Sillery (d. 1640), 2nd Marquis of Sillery and Puisieulx, Baron of Grand-Pressigny and Lord of Ferrières and Etableau, m. 1615: Charlotte d'Estampes de Valençay (1597–1677)
        - Charlotte Brûlart (c. 1619–1697) m. 1640: François d'Estampes, Marquis of Mauny
        - Nicolas-François Brûlart
        - Louis Roger Brûlart de Sillery (1619–1691), 3rd Marquis of Sillery, m. 1638: Marie-Catherine de La Rochefoucauld
          - Charles-Roger Brûlart (1640–1719), 4th Marquis of Sillery, m. 1668: Claude Godet de Renneval
            - Félix-François Brûlart (d. 1707), styled Count of Sillery m. Claudine-Anne Brulart (c. 1673–1740)
          - Fabio Brulart de Sillery (1655–1714)
          - Carloman-Philogène Brûlart (c. 1656–1727), m. 1697: Marie-Louise Bigot
            - Louis-Philogène Brûlart de Sillery (1702–1770), m. 1722: Charlotte-Félicité Le Tellier de Louvois de Souvré (1708–1783)
              - Adélaïde-Félicité Brûlart m. 1744: Louis-Charles-César Le Tellier de Louvois de Courtanvaux, Duke of Estrées (1695–1771)
          - Louis Brûlart (1642–1664)
          - Charles-Henri (c. 1650–1664), Lord of Briançon
          - Achille Brûlart (d. 1674)
          - François Brûlart (d. 1668)
    - Mathieu Brûlart, Lord of Berny m. Marie de Boudeville, Lady of Vaux
      - Pierre Brûlart m. Marie-Madeleine de Cerisiers
        - Noël Brûlart (d. 1714), Lord of Vaux
    - Marie Brûlart m. Louis II Durand de Villegagnon
    - Anne Brûlart m. 1582: Laurent Cauchon
    - Madeleine Brûlart (d. 1635) m. 1587: Guichard Faure
      - Angélique Faure m. 1612: Claude de Bullion
    - Noël Brûlart de Sillery (1577–1640)
  - Marie Brulart m. Charles Le Prévost
    - Madeleine Le Prévost (b. 1566) m. 1587: Charles III d'O de Baillet (d. 1639).

=== Younger branch, called La Borde ===
- Denis I Brûlart (1532–1611) Lord of Reullée, Baron of Sombernon and of La Borde
  - Nicolas I Brûlart (d. 1627) m. 1593: Marguerite-Marie Bourgeois d'Origny
    - Denis II Brûlart, Marquis of La Borde, x 1623 Marie Massol de Rouvres
      - Nicolas II Brûlart (1627–1692), Marquis of La Borde, Baron of Sombernon, Couches and Mâlain, m. (1) Marie Cazet de Vautort, (2) 1669: Marie Bouthillier de Chavigny
        - Jacqueline-Charlotte Brûlart (c. 1660–1743) m. 1689: André-Louis de Loménie, Count of Brienne.
        - Marie Brûlart de La Borde (c. 1684–1763) m. (1) 1704: Louis-Joseph de Béthune Marquis of Charost, (2) 1732: Charles Philippe d'Albert, 4th Duke of Luynes
        - Anne Brûlart (d. 1711) m. Gaspard II de Vichy de Montceaux, Count of Champrond (1664–1736)
      - Noël Brûlart (1632–1694), Count of Rouvres m. (1) Jeanne Gruyn des Bordes (d. 1686), (2) 1695: Bonne-Marie Bachelier de Beaubourg (d. 1716)
        - Madeleine Brûlart (c. 1666–1761), Lady of Rouvres m. 1696: Louis Tissart
        - Denis-Noël Brûlart (1670–1739), Marquis of Rouvres
    - Françoise-Marguerite Brûlart m. 1613: Claude de Saulx-Tavannes de Buzançais
  - Noël Brûlart (d. c. 1653), Baron of Sombernon, Lord of Mâlain

=== Younger branch, called Genlis ===
- Pierre Brûlart de Genlis (1535–1608), Lord of Genlis and of Crosne
  - Gilles Brûlart (1575–1637) m. (1) Anne de Hallwin, Lady of Quierzy
    - Florimond I Brulart (c. 1602–1685), 1st Marquis of Genlis, Lord of Triel, m. (1) 1628: Charlotte de Brunetel.
      - Florimond II Brûlart (c. 1626–1653), 2nd Marquis of Genlis
      - Charles Brûlart (c. 1628–1714)
      - Claude-Charles Brûlart (d. 1673), 3rd Marquis of Genlis, m. 1669: Angélique Fabert
        - Marie-Anne Claude Brulart (1669–1750), Lady of Abbécourt and of Pisy, m. Henri d'Harcourt de Beuvron 1st Duke of Harcourt
      - Hardouin Brûlart (d. 1699)
      - Pierre-François Brûlart de Genlis (c. 1648–1733), 4th Marquis of Genlis, m. 1703: Claudine-Anne Brûlart, Marquise of Sillery, Lady of Sillery, Ludes and Puisieulx.
        - Charles-Pierre Brûlart (c. 1706–1753), 5th Marquis of Genlis, m. 1726: Louise-Charlotte-Françoise d'Hallencourt de Dromesnil
          - Charles-Claude Brûlart (b. 1733), 6th Marquis of Genlis, (Note: Charles-Claude Brûlart, 6th Marquis of Genlis, sold the marquisate on 5 October 1772 to Louis-Alexandre Céleste d'Aumont, which was elevated into the Duchy of Villequier d'Aumont in April 1774.) m. 1765: Jeanne-Marie-Pulchérie de Riotot de Villemeur de La Martinière
          - Charles Alexis Brûlart de Sillery (1737–1793), styled Count of Genlis, 5th Marquis of Sillery, m. Félicité du Crest de St-Aubin (1746–1830)
            - Caroline-Jeanne-Séraphine Brûlart (1765–1786)
            - Edmée-Nicole-Pulchérie Brûlart (1767–1847) m. Jean-Baptiste Cyrus de Timbrune, Count of Valence (1757–1822)
              - Rose-Edmée-Louise-Paméla "Rosemonde" de Timbrune de Valence (1789–1860) m. Étienne Maurice Gérard (1773–1852)
                - Louis Maurice Fortuné Gérard (1819–1880), Sylvie Perruche (1833–1903)
                  - Rosemonde Gérard (1871–1953) m. Edmond Rostand (1868–1918)
                    - Maurice Rostand (1891–1968)
                    - Jean Rostand (1894–1977) m. 1920: Andrée Mante
            - Casimir-Charles-Philogène Brûlart (1768–1783)
          - Louis-Marie Brûlart (1738–1761)
    - Charles Brûlart (d. 1669), Abbot of Prémontrés
    - René Brulart (1617–1696), styled Baron of Genlis, Marquis of Pisy, Lord of Presles in Cussy, and of Villeprenoy and Ferrières in Andryes, m. Anne de Longueval
  - Charles I Brûlart de Genlis (1572–1649)
  - Noël Brûlart (d. 1597), Lord of Crosne
  - Louis-Roger Brûlart (d. 1646), Lord of Broussin in Fay and of Ranché in Teloché, m. Madeleine Colbert de Villacerf (d. 1690)
  - Magdelaine Brûlart m. François Robertet d'Alluyes in Perche-Gouët
  - Nicolas Brûlart (d. 1659), Lord of Boulay à Souppes, de Poligny and of Obsonville, m. Marie-Madeleine de Cerisiers, widow of Pierre Brûlart de Sillery de Vaux
    - François Brûlart (d. 1703), who inherited from Marie-Sidonie de Lenoncourt, Marquise of Courcelles
    - Anne Brûlart m. Louis d'Estourmel du Frétoy
    - Marie Brûlart m. Nicolas-Louis, Marquis of Vitry (younger son of Nicolas de L'Hospital)
    - Louis Brûlart (d. 1676), Abbot of Neauphle
  - Marie Brûlart (d. 1631) m. (1) 1587: François, Baron of Mailloc and Lord of Émalleville, (2) François de Raveton de Chauvigny de Crulai

== Titles ==
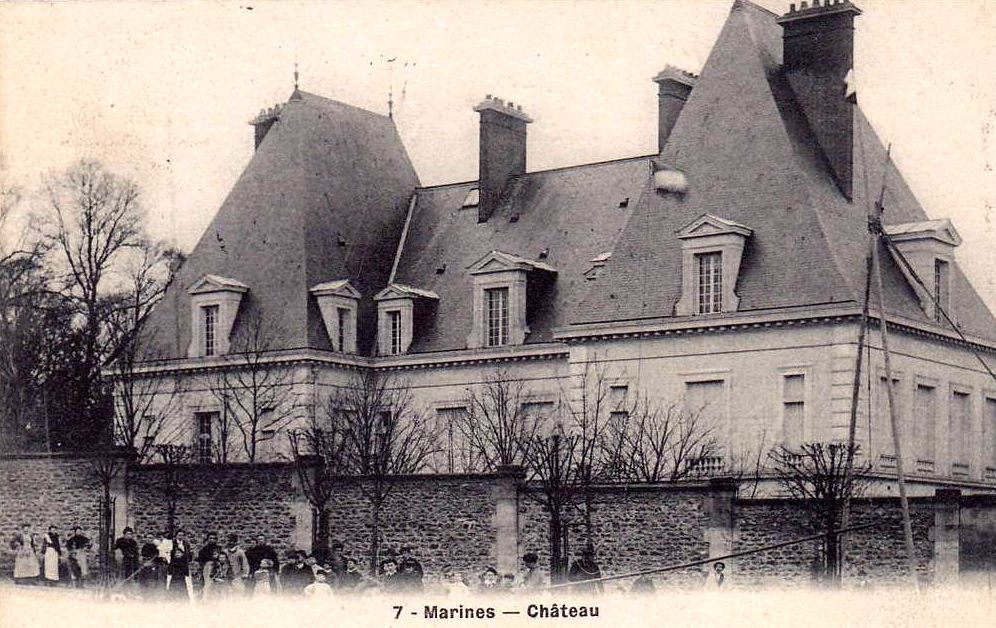
Château de Marines in Marines, Val-d'Oise

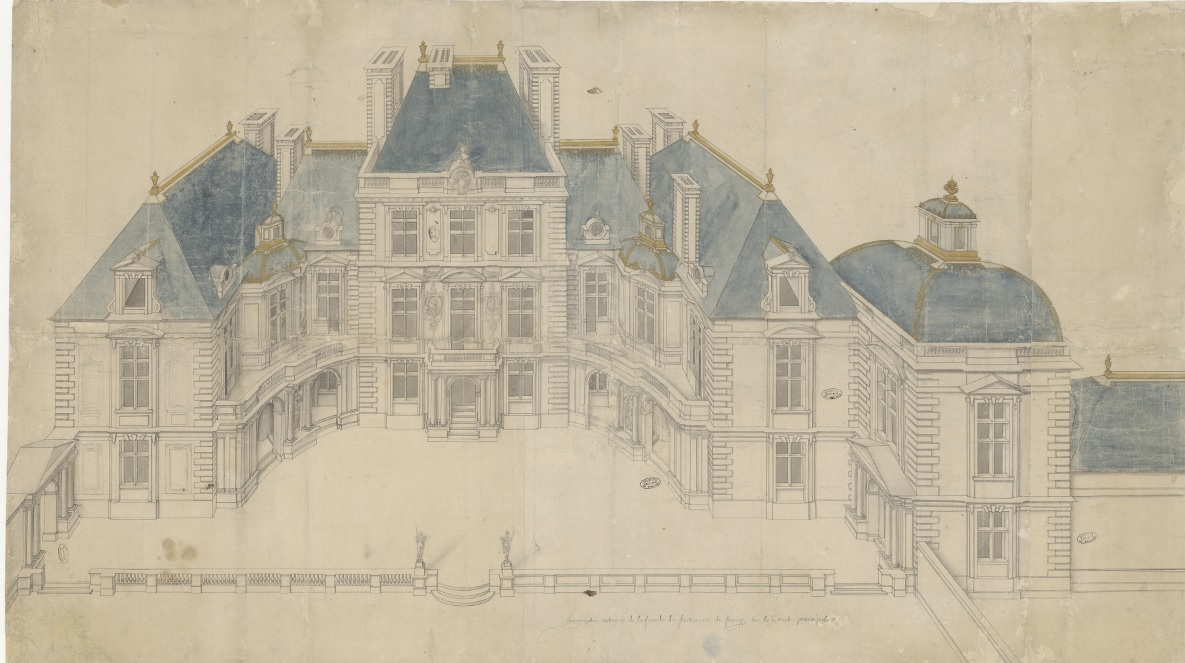
Château de Berny in today's Val-de-Marne

- Marquis of Sillery
- Marquis of Genlis
- Marquis of La Borde
- Marquis of Puisieulx
- Viscount of Puisieulx
- Viscount of Ludes
- Baron of Boursault
- Baron of Grand-Pressigny
- Lord of Génicourt
- Lord of Marines
- Lord of Bréançon
- Lord of Ferrières
- Lord of Etableau

== Châteaux and mansions ==
- Hôtel Brulart, 25 rue des Écouffes
- Château de Marines
- Château de Berny
- Château de Pisy

== See also ==
- French nobility
