= Marie Brûlart =

French court official

- Duchess of Luynes
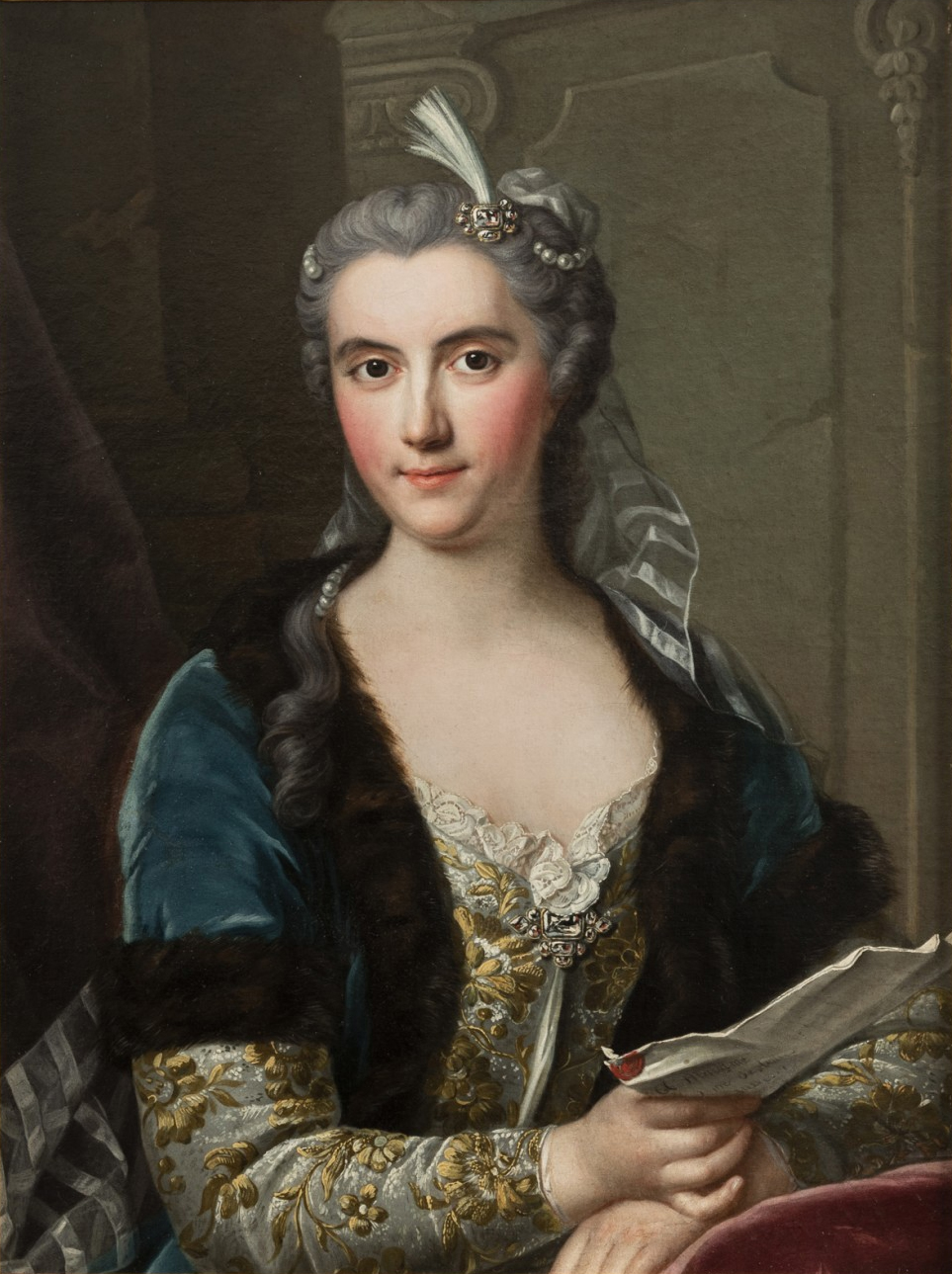
- Presumed portrait of Marie Brûlart, attributed to Louis Tocqué, c. 1720–1740
- Full name: Marie Brûlart
- Born: c. 1684
- Died: 11 September 1763 (aged 78–79); Versailles, France
- Noble family: Brûlart (by birth); Béthune (by marriage); Albert (by marriage)
- Spouses: Louis Joseph de Béthune, Marquis of Chârost (m. 1704; died 1709) Charles Philippe d'Albert, 4th Duke of Luynes (m. 1732; died 1758)
- Issue: Marie Therese de Béthune-Chârost
- Father: Nicolas Brûlart, Marquis of La Borde
- Mother: Marie Bouthillier de Chavigny

Marie Brûlart, duchesse de Luynes (c. 1684 – 11 September 1763), was a French court official (dame d'honneur) and close friend and confidante to Louis XV's queen consort, Marie Leszczyńska, whom she attended at Versailles for nearly thirty years (1735–63).

== Early life ==
Marie was born in c. 1684, the daughter of Nicolas Brûlart, Marquis of La Borde, and, his second wife, Marie Bouthillier de Chavigny. From her father's first marriage to Marie Cazet de Vautort, she had an elder half-sister, Jacqueline-Charlotte Brûlart, who married André-Louis de Loménie, Count of Brienne.

Her paternal grandparents were Denis II Brûlart, Marquis of La Borde, and the former Marie Massol de Rouvres.

== Personal life ==
In 1704, she married Louis Joseph de Béthune, Marquis of Chârost (1681–1709), who was killed fighting against the British forces of the Duke of Marlborough at the Battle of Malplaquet, four days after the marquise gave birth to their only child:

- Marie Therese de Béthune-Chârost (1709–1716), who died young.

As a widow, she remarried as her second husband, and his second wife, Charles Philippe d'Albert (1695–1758), the fourth Duke of Luynes, in 1732. From this marriage, she became step-mother of Marie Charles Louis d'Albert, duc de Chevreuse (1717–1771).

=== Court life ===
On 18 October 1735, she was appointed to succeed Catherine-Charlotte de Boufflers as dame d'honneur of the queen. A relation to a previous court official was a qualification to a court office, and she was the sister-in-law to the duchess de Béthune, who had been one of the twelve original Dame du Palais appointed to the queen in 1725. The position of dame d'honneur was formally the deputy and second in rank among the queen's female courtiers after the surintendante, but it was transformed to become the first in rank and chief lady-in-waiting when the position of surintendante was left vacant after 1741, which made her the first ranked of all ladies-in-waiting for the duration of her time in the position. As such, she was responsible for the rest of the queen's ladies-in-waiting.

Marie Brûlart was the personal friend and confidante of the queen, and described as one of her two favorites among her ladies-in-waiting, the other one being duchess Françoise de Mazarin (d. 1742) and, after her death, Amable-Gabrielle de Villars. She was a part of the intimate circle of friends with whom the queen retired to her apartments after having fulfilled her ceremonial duties, consisting also of her grand almoner Cardinal de Luynes, Duke Charles Philippe d'Albert de Luynes, President Hénault, her Surintendant since 1753, and Count d'Argensson. From 1751, Marie Brûlart allowed her duties to be handled by her deputy, her daughter-in-law Henriette-Nicole Pignatelli d'Egmont, duchess de Chevreuse (1719-1782), but she formally kept her rank and title of dame d'honneur and kept attending court in her capacity of the queen's friend. When de Chevreuse resigned in 1761, Marie Brûlart resumed the duties of her office again and retained them until her death.

Her husband left memoirs of the couple's life at court, leaving many interesting observations of the royal family, and of the king's mistress, Madame de Pompadour, whom the duke and duchess appear to have grown to respect over a period of time, though this grudging admiration did not affect the duchess's friendship or loyalty to Queen Marie Leszczyńska. Madame de Luynes died aged 79.

Court offices
Preceded by Catherine-Charlotte de Boufflers	Première dame d'honneur to the Queen of France; 1735–1763	Succeeded by Anne d'Arpajon
