= Ram Sahai (disambiguation) =

Ram Sahai may refer to several notable individuals:

- Ram Sahai, Indian politician and Rajya Sabha member from Madhya Pradesh
- Ram Sahai (tabla player), Indian tabla player
- Ram Sahai Tiwary, member of the Constituent Assembly of India
- Ramsahai Pandey, member of parliament, Lok Sabha
- Ram Sahay Panday, Indian Rai dancer
- Ram Sahaya Yadav, Nepalese politician
- Ram Sahay Varma, member of 16th Rajasthan Assembly
