= Cormontreuil =

- Commune
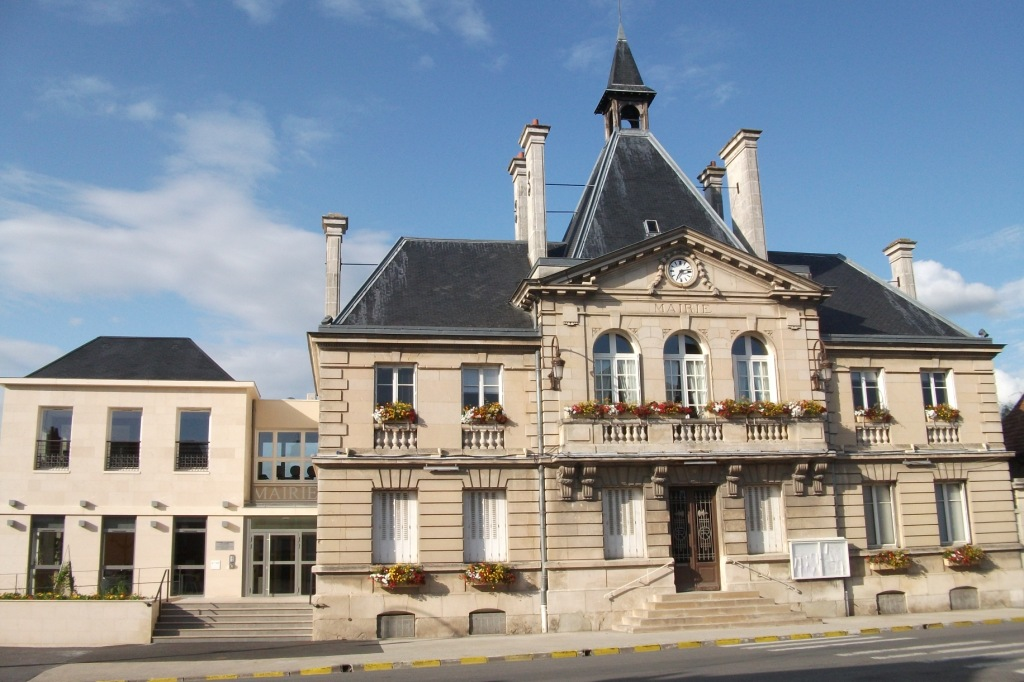
- The town hall in Cormontreuil

- Coat of arms
- Location of Cormontreuil
- Location within France Location within Grand Est
- Coordinates: 49°13′23″N 4°03′10″E
- Country: France
- Region: Grand Est
- Department: Marne
- Arrondissement: Reims
- Canton: Reims-8
- Intercommunality: CU Grand Reims

Government
  - Mayor (2020–2026): Jean Marx
- Area^{1}: 4.62 km^{2} (1.78 sq mi)
- Elevation: 84 m (276 ft)
- Population (2023): 6,534
  - Density: 1,410/km^{2} (3,660/sq mi)
- Time zone: UTC+01:00 (CET)
  - Summer (DST): UTC+02:00 (CEST)
- INSEE/Postal code: 51172 /51350
- ^{1} French Land Register data, which excludes lakes, ponds, glaciers > 1 km^{2} (0.386 sq mi or 247 acres) and river estuaries.

Cormontreuil (French pronunciation: [kɔʁmɔ̃tʁœj]) is a commune in the Marne department in north-eastern France.

== Population ==
Historical population
Year	Pop.	±% p.a.
1968	1,602	—
1975	3,601	+12.27%
1982	6,080	+7.77%
1990	5,745	−0.71%
1999	6,390	+1.19%
2007	6,269	−0.24%
2012	6,057	−0.69%
2017	6,524	+1.50%
2023	6,534	+0.03%
Source: INSEE

== See also ==
- Communes of the Marne department
