= Prunay =

- Commune
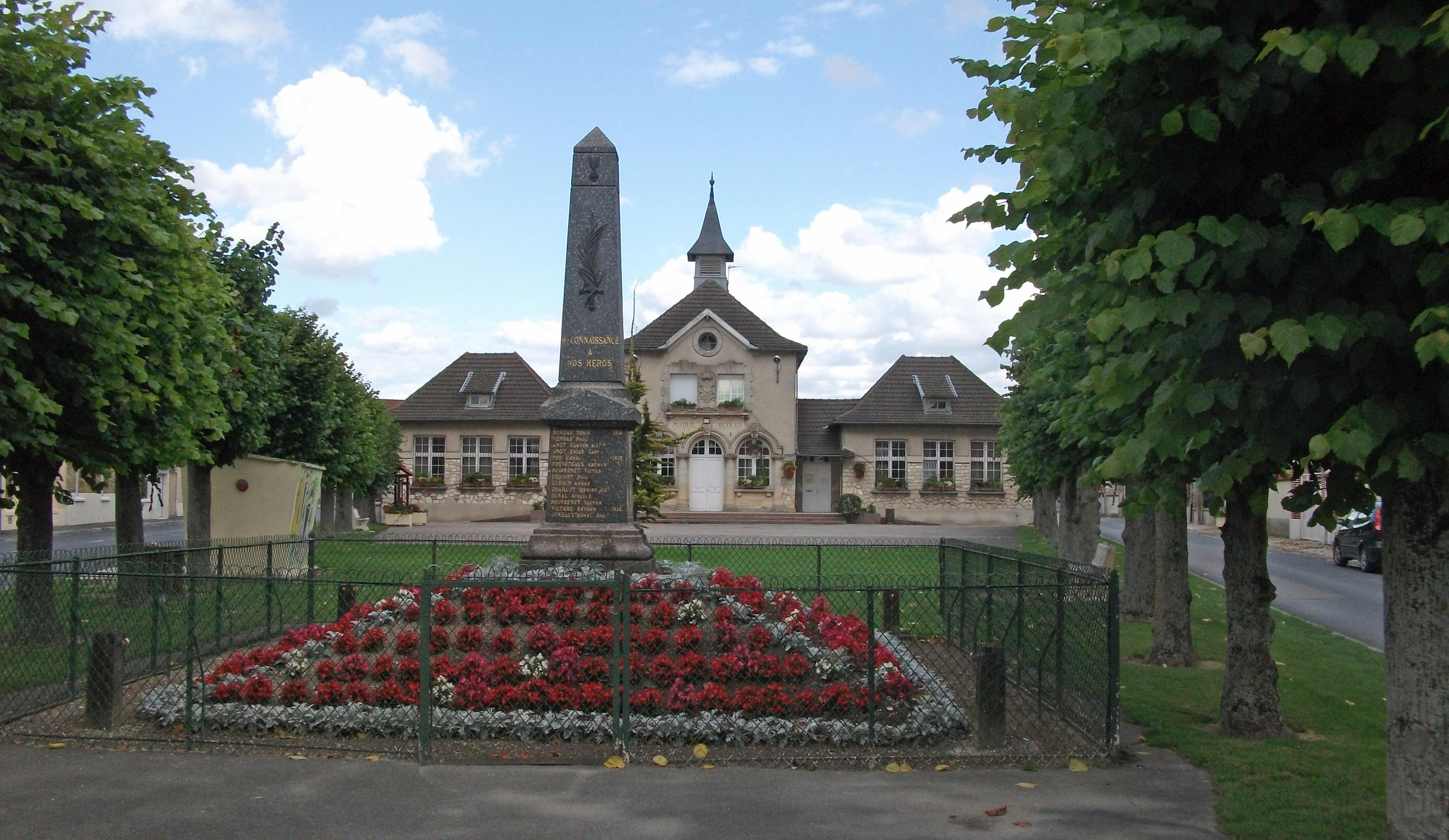
- The town hall and war memorial in Prunay

- Coat of arms
- Location of Prunay
- Location within France Location within Grand Est
- Coordinates: 49°11′51″N 4°11′05″E
- Country: France
- Region: Grand Est
- Department: Marne
- Arrondissement: Reims
- Canton: Reims-8
- Intercommunality: CU Grand Reims

Government
  - Mayor (2020–2026): Frédéric Lepan
- Area^{1}: 18.41 km^{2} (7.11 sq mi)
- Highest elevation: 160 m (520 ft)
- Lowest elevation: 86 m (282 ft)
- Population (2023): 1,042
  - Density: 56.60/km^{2} (146.6/sq mi)
- Time zone: UTC+01:00 (CET)
  - Summer (DST): UTC+02:00 (CEST)
- INSEE/Postal code: 51449 /51360
- ^{1} French Land Register data, which excludes lakes, ponds, glaciers > 1 km^{2} (0.386 sq mi or 247 acres) and river estuaries.

Prunay (pronounced [pʁy.nɛ]) is a commune in the Marne department in north-eastern France. An important pottery vase with La Tène decoration dating to between 400-350 BC was found in the commune. Known as the Prunay Vase, it is now in the British Museum's collection.

== See also ==
- Communes of the Marne department

== Gallery ==
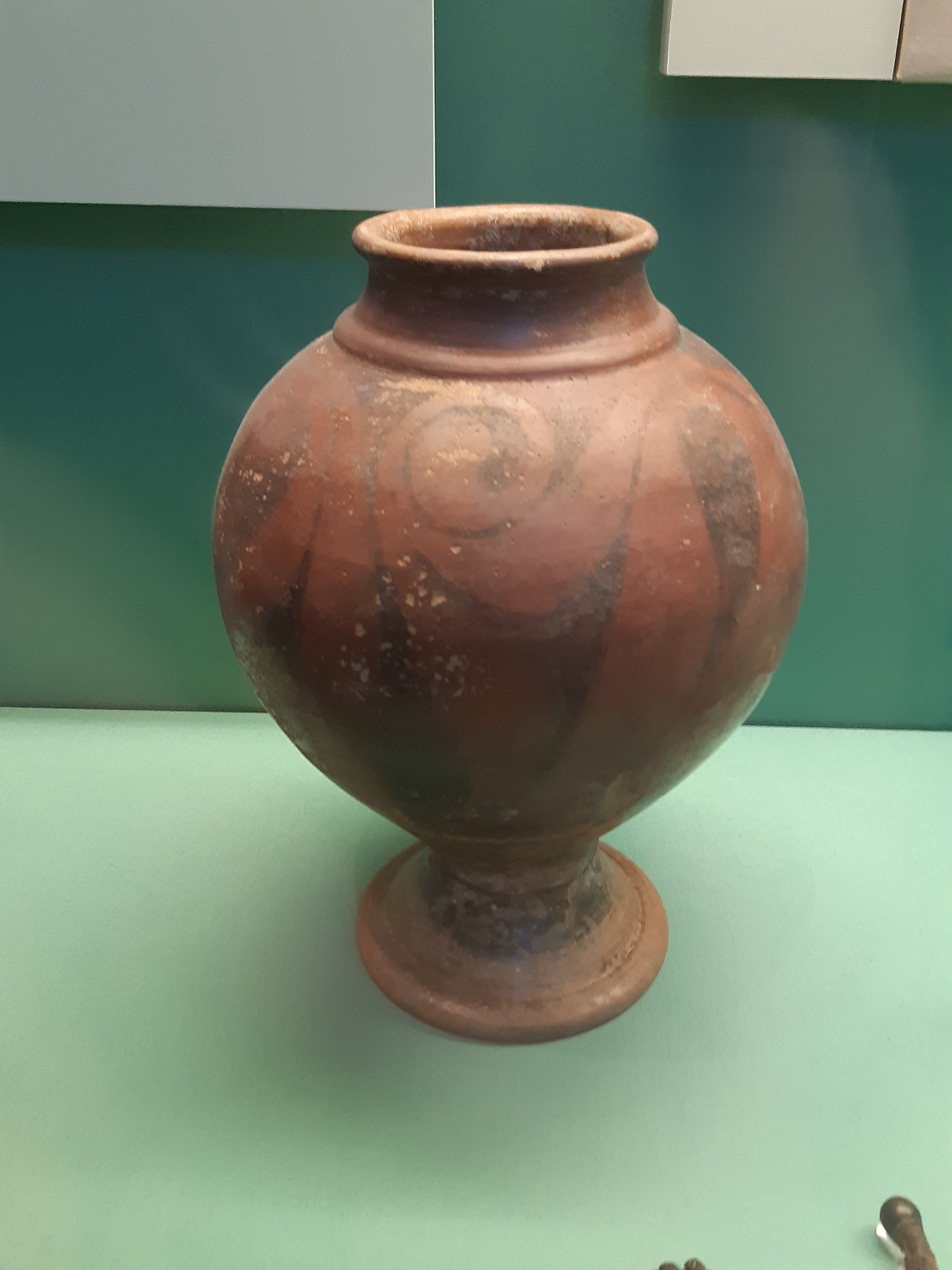
Prunay Vase in the British Museum
