= Saint-Léonard, Marne =

Saint-Léonard
- Commune
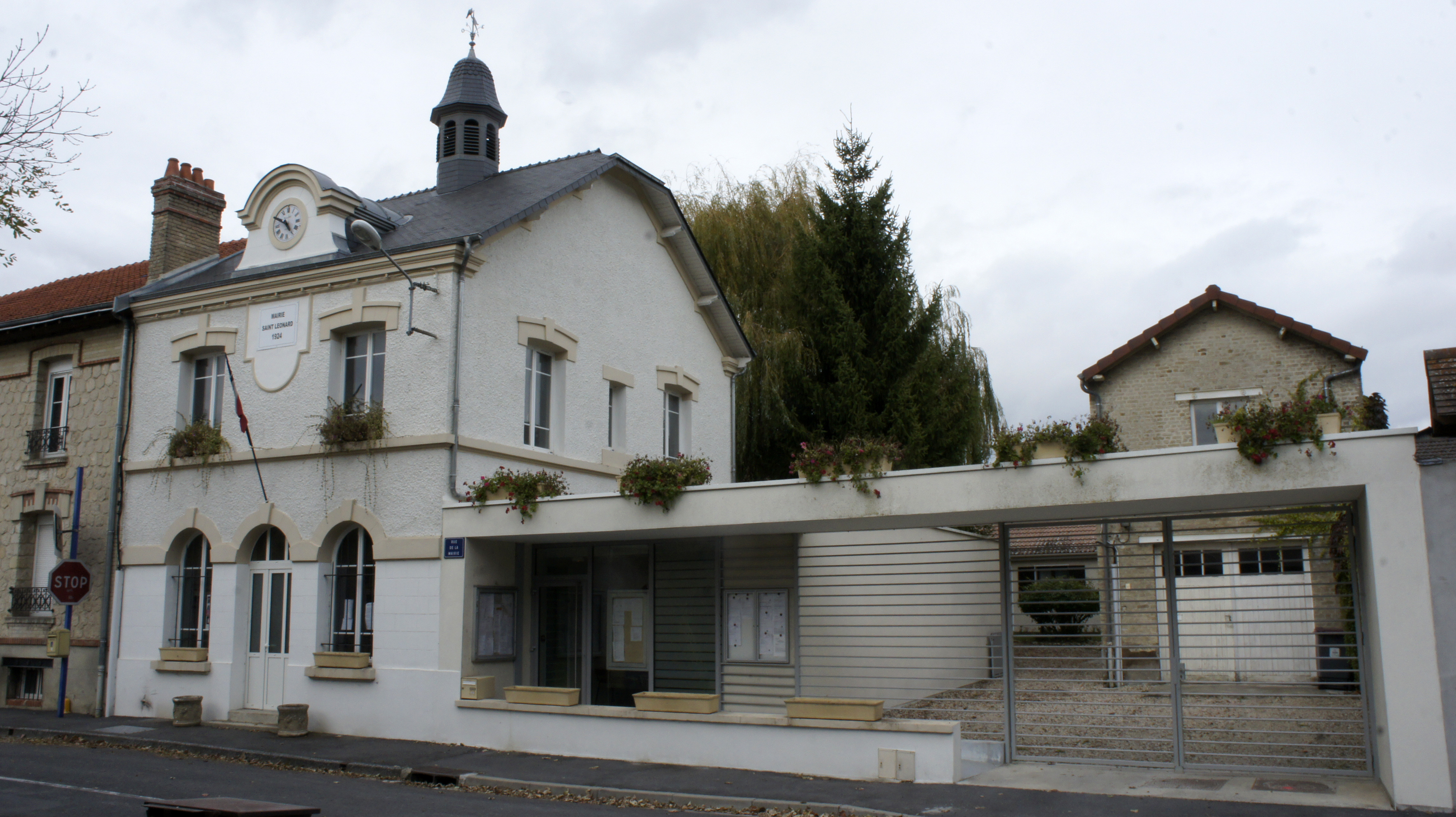
- The town hall in Saint-Léonard
- Location of Saint-Léonard
- Location within France Location within Grand Est
- Coordinates: 49°13′17″N 4°05′50″E
- Country: France
- Region: Grand Est
- Department: Marne
- Arrondissement: Reims
- Canton: Reims-8
- Intercommunality: CU Grand Reims

Government
  - Mayor (2023–2026): Michèle Renard
- Area^{1}: 3.04 km^{2} (1.17 sq mi)
- Elevation: 82 m (269 ft)
- Population (2023): 96
  - Density: 32/km^{2} (82/sq mi)
- Time zone: UTC+01:00 (CET)
  - Summer (DST): UTC+02:00 (CEST)
- INSEE/Postal code: 51493 /51500
- ^{1} French Land Register data, which excludes lakes, ponds, glaciers > 1 km^{2} (0.386 sq mi or 247 acres) and river estuaries.

Saint-Léonard (French pronunciation: [sɛ̃ leɔnaʁ]) is a commune in the Marne department in north-eastern France.

== See also ==
- Communes of the Marne department
