= Taissy =

- Commune
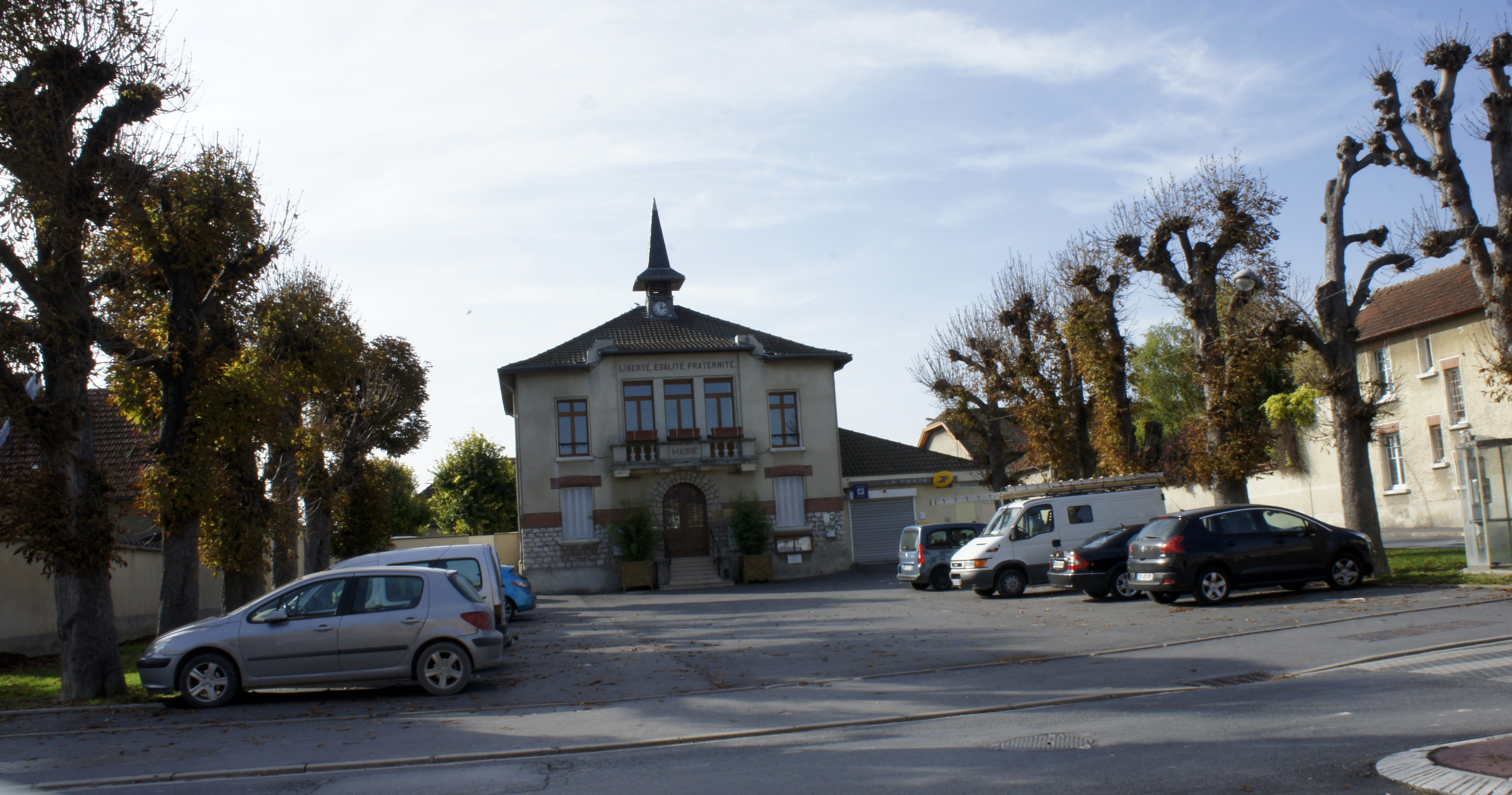
- The town hall in Taissy

- Coat of arms
- Location of Taissy
- Location within France Location within Grand Est
- Coordinates: 49°12′56″N 4°05′44″E
- Country: France
- Region: Grand Est
- Department: Marne
- Arrondissement: Reims
- Canton: Reims-8
- Intercommunality: CU Grand Reims

Government
  - Mayor (2020–2026): Patrice Barrier
- Area^{1}: 11.53 km^{2} (4.45 sq mi)
- Elevation: 85 m (279 ft)
- Population (2023): 2,194
  - Density: 190.3/km^{2} (492.8/sq mi)
- Time zone: UTC+01:00 (CET)
  - Summer (DST): UTC+02:00 (CEST)
- INSEE/Postal code: 51562 /51500
- ^{1} French Land Register data, which excludes lakes, ponds, glaciers > 1 km^{2} (0.386 sq mi or 247 acres) and river estuaries.

Taissy (French pronunciation: [tɛsi]) is a commune in the Marne department in north-eastern France.

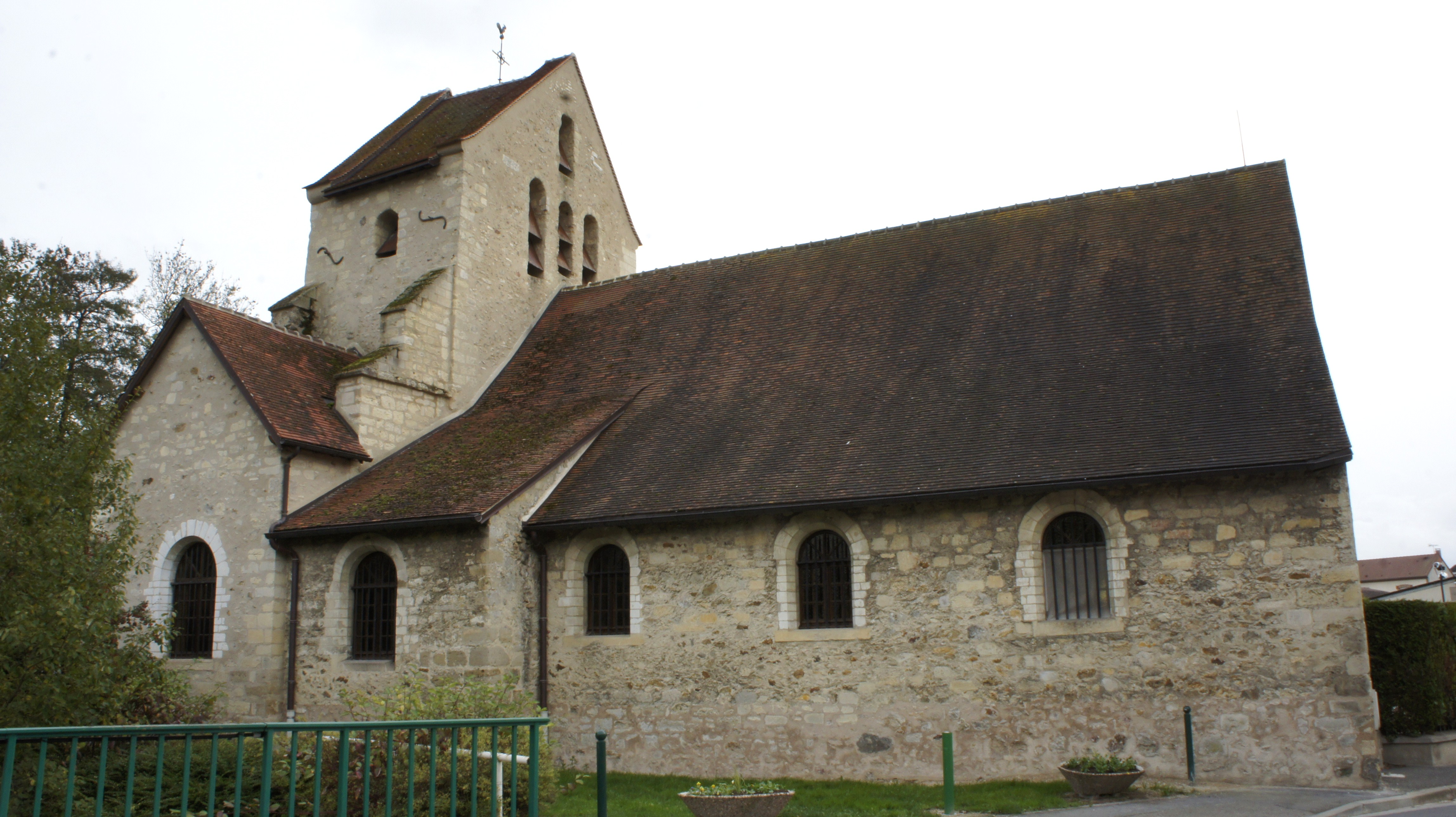
church.

== Population ==
Historical population
Year	Pop.	±% p.a.
1968	620	—
1975	1,879	+17.16%
1982	1,969	+0.67%
1990	2,318	+2.06%
1999	2,355	+0.18%
2007	2,199	−0.85%
2012	2,284	+0.76%
2017	2,199	−0.76%
2023	2,194	−0.04%
Source: INSEE

== See also ==
- Communes of the Marne department
