= Cernay-lès-Reims =

- Commune
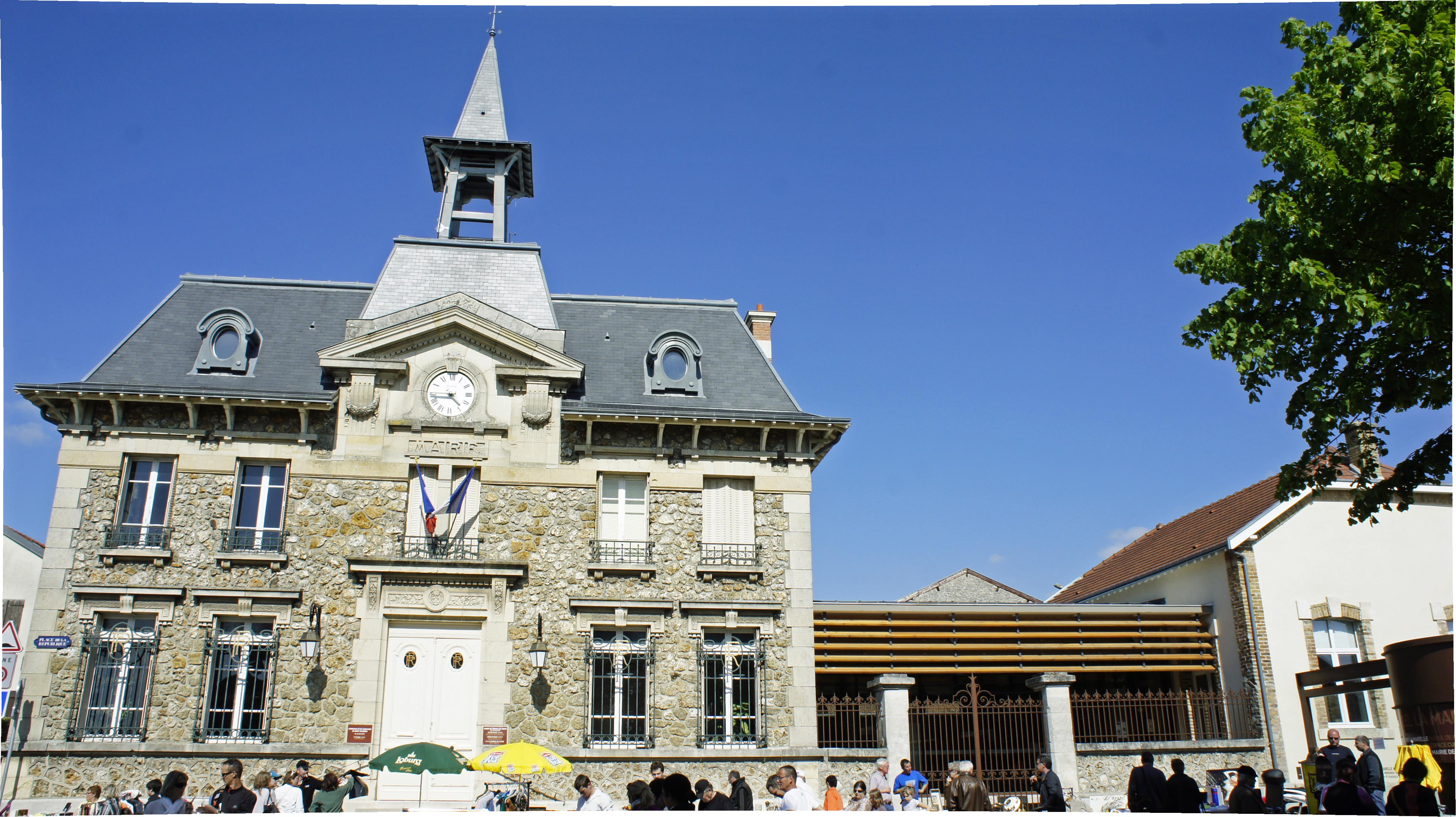
- The town hall in Cernay-lès-Reims

- Coat of arms
- Location of Cernay-lès-Reims
- Location within France Location within Grand Est
- Coordinates: 49°09′19″N 4°03′41″E
- Country: France
- Region: Grand Est
- Department: Marne
- Arrondissement: Reims
- Canton: Reims-8
- Intercommunality: CU Grand Reims

Government
  - Mayor (2020–2026): Patrick Bedek
- Area^{1}: 16.49 km^{2} (6.37 sq mi)
- Elevation: 140 m (460 ft)
- Highest elevation: 217 m (712 ft)
- Lowest elevation: 96 m (315 ft)
- Population (2023): 1,624
  - Density: 98.48/km^{2} (255.1/sq mi)
- Time zone: UTC+01:00 (CET)
  - Summer (DST): UTC+02:00 (CEST)
- INSEE/Postal code: 51105 /51420
- ^{1} French Land Register data, which excludes lakes, ponds, glaciers > 1 km^{2} (0.386 sq mi or 247 acres) and river estuaries.

Cernay-lès-Reims (French pronunciation: [sɛʁnɛ lɛ ʁɛ̃s], literally Cernay near Reims) is a commune in the Marne department in north-eastern France.

Cernay-lès-Reims, along with the neighboring commune of Berru, is notable in the literature of paleontology as the site of a geologic formation (part of the Paris Basin) that has yielded a significant number of Paleocene-strata fossils.

== See also ==
- Communes of the Marne department
