= Sahai =

Sahai (also spelled as Sahay) is a surname. Notable people with the surname include:

- Krishna Ballabh Sahay, Chief Minister of Erstwhile Bihar
- Dinesh Nandan Sahay, Former IPS and Governor of Tripura and Chhattisgarh.
- Shyam Nandan Sahay, Indian landlord, educationist and legislator
- Subodh Kant Sahay, Indian politician and Former Minister of Tourism, Government of India
- Chandipat Sahay, Indian zamindar and politician
- Lala Hanumant Sahay, Indian freedom fighter
- Chaturbhuj Sahay (1883-1957), Indian mystic
- Acharya Shivpujan Sahay, Indian Hindi novelist, editor and prose writer
- Alankrita Sahai (born 1994), Indian model
- Amit Sahai (born 1974), American computer scientist
- Ganga Sahai, British Indian 19th-century Sanskrit scholar
- Raghunath Sahai Puri, Indian politician
- Ram Sahai (1895-?), Indian politician
- Sachchidanand Sahai (born 1941), Indian epigraphist
- Sanjiv N. Sahai (born 1961), Indian businessman
- Shashi Bhushan Sahai, Indian writer and police officer
- Sheetla Sahai (1932-2011), Indian politician
- Suman Sahai, Indian activist
- Vivek Sahai, Indian transportation and management expert
- Ram Sahai (tabla player), Founder of the Benares gharana
