= Hôtel de Chevreuse =

Demolished 17th-century Parisian mansion

Coordinates: 48.85554°N 2.32679°E

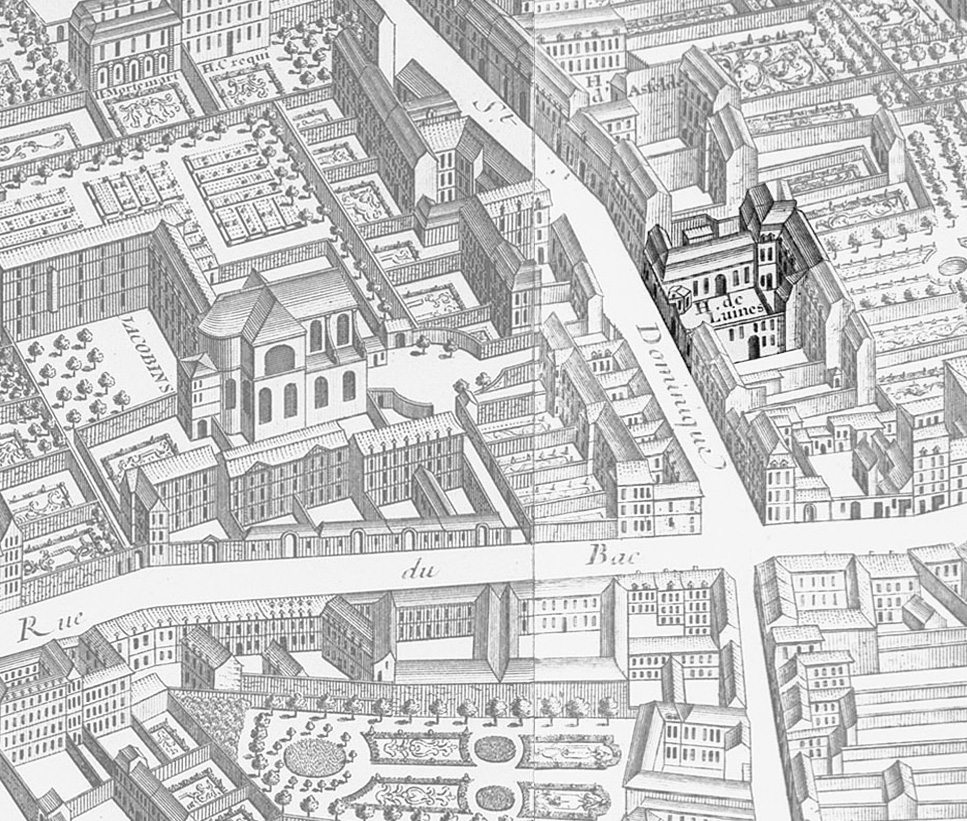
The Hôtel de Chevreuse ("H. de Luines") on the 1739 Turgot map of Paris

The former Hôtel de Chevreuse (French pronunciation: [otɛl də ʃəvʁøz]; later known as the Hôtel de Luynes [otɛl də lɥin]) was a Parisian hôtel particulier located at 33 Rue Saint-Dominique (on a site that now includes part of the Boulevard Saint-Germain), just south of the Église Saint-Thomas-d'Aquin.

== History ==
The Hôtel de Chevreuse was constructed in 1660 for Marie de Rohan, Duchess of Chevreuse, by the architect Pierre Le Muet, whose designs were engraved by Jean Marot and published in the Grand Marot in 1686. Le Muet's hôtel was in the traditional French style, between court and garden.

Pierre Le Muet's designs, engraved by Jean Marot

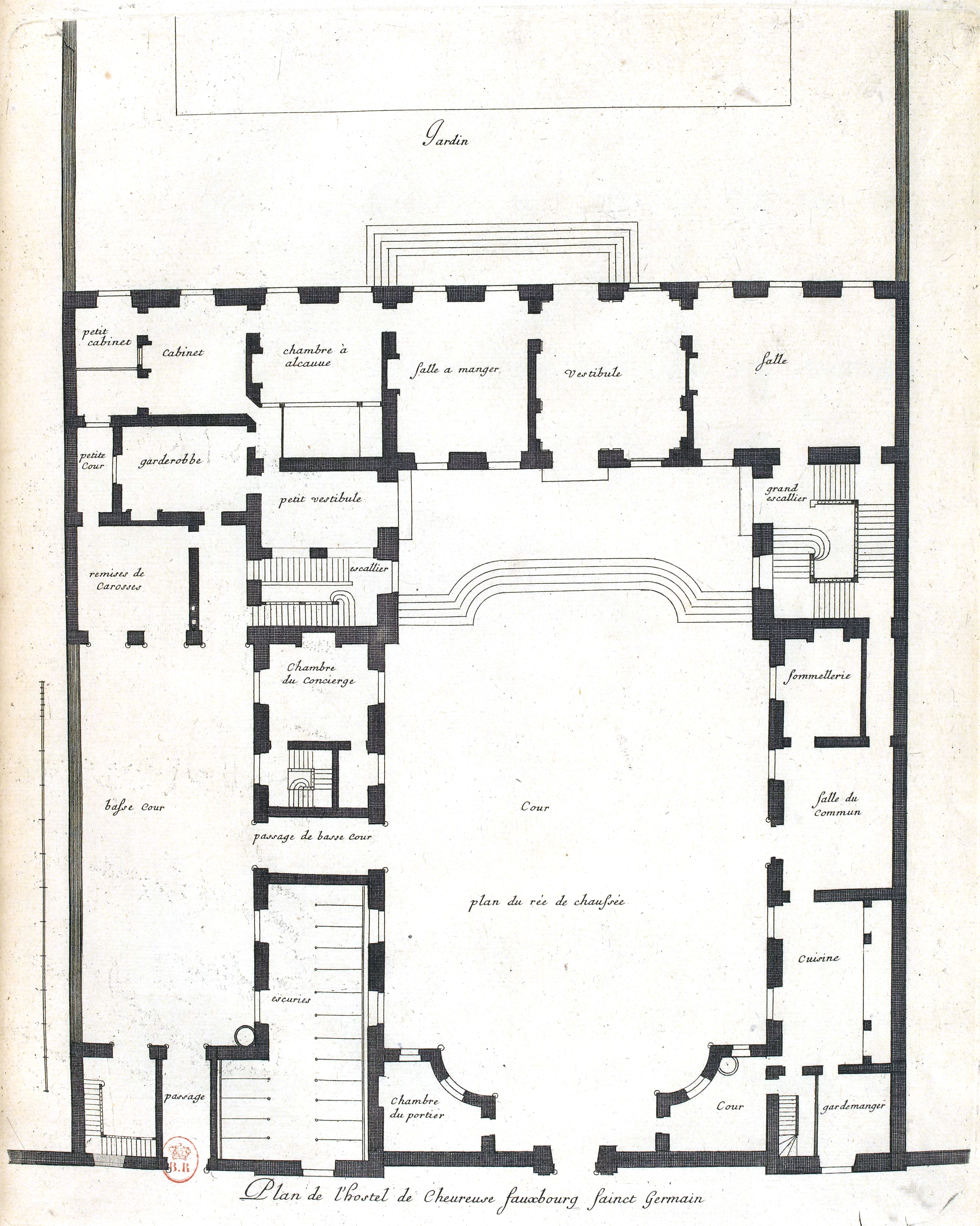
Plan of the ground floor

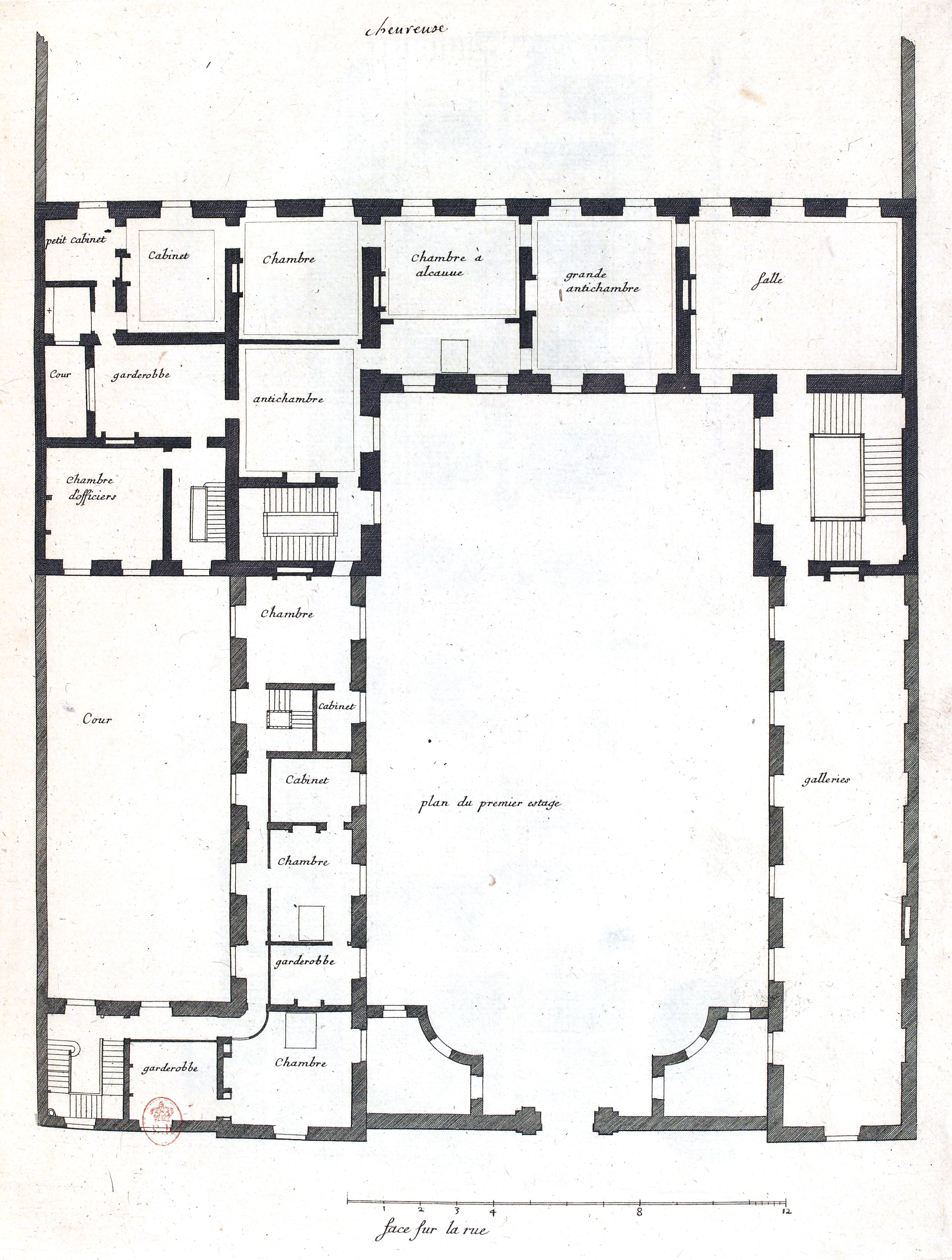
Plan of the main floor

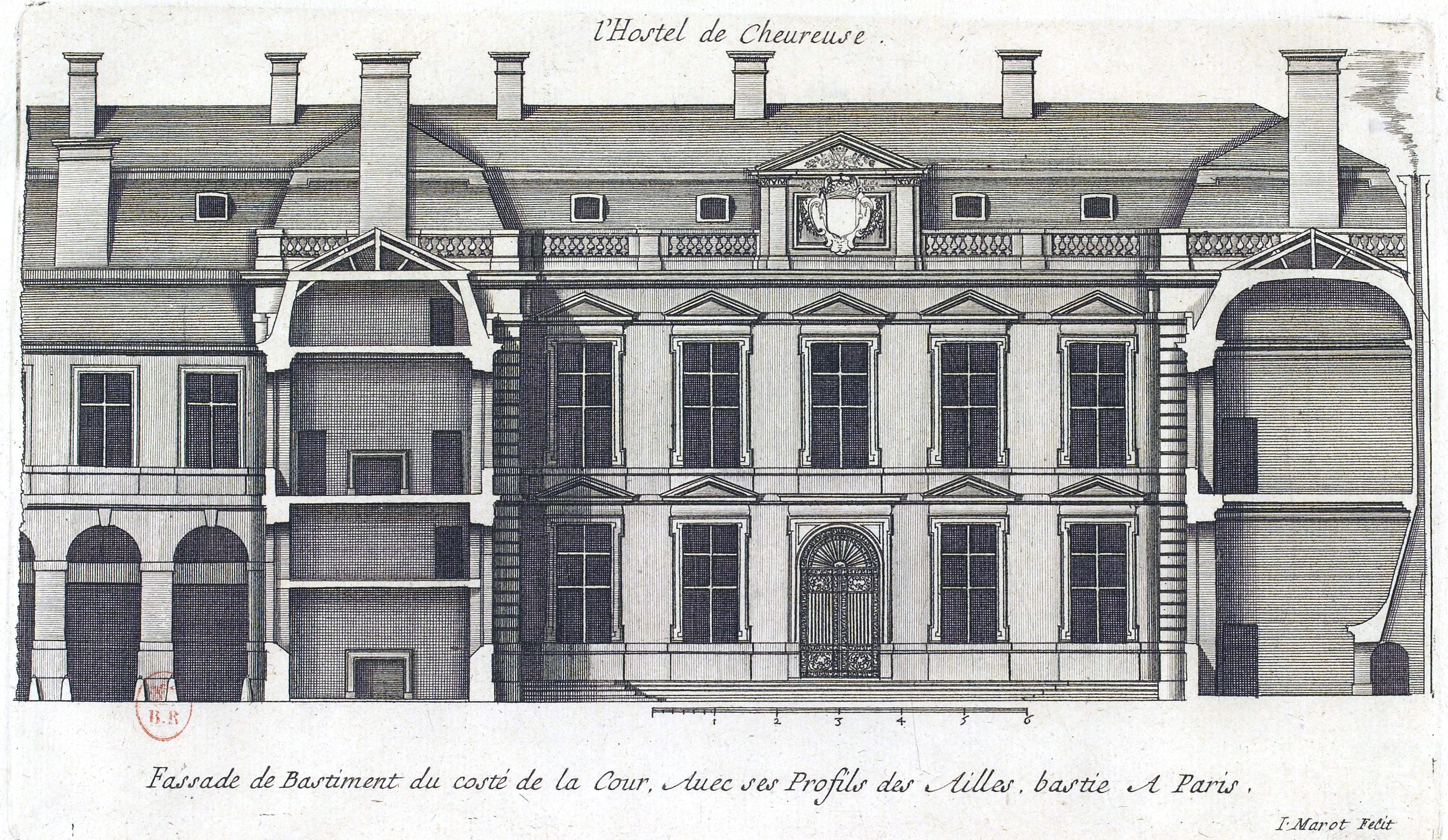
Court facade of the corps de logis

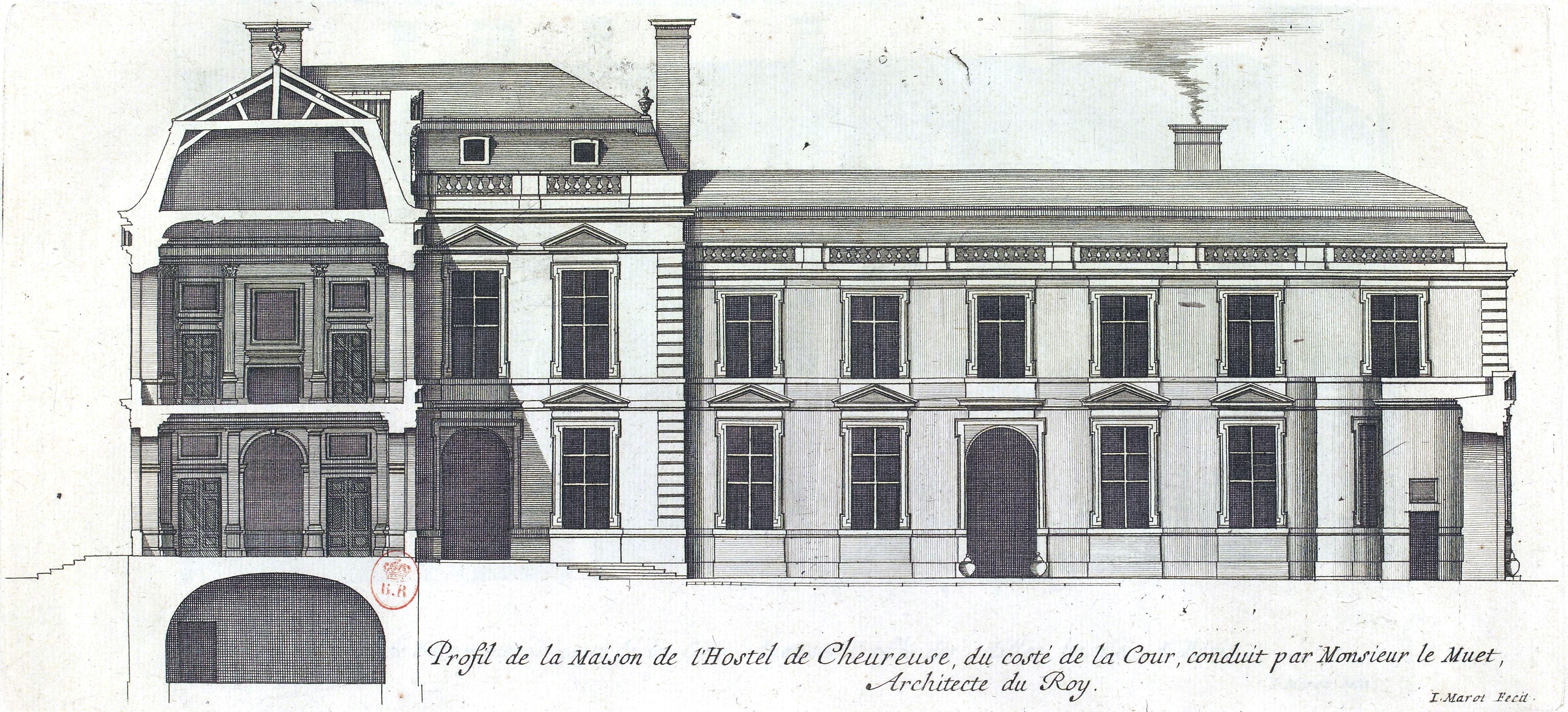
Transverse section of the corps de logis and elevation of the court facade of the west wing

In 1670, the granddaughter of Marie de Rohan, Jeanne Baptiste d'Albert, was born at the Hôtel de Chevreuse. Upon Marie de Rohan's death in 1679, the house passed to Jeanne-Baptiste's father, Louis Charles d'Albert, Duke of Luynes, Marie de Rohan's son from her first marriage.

In 1747 the Italian painter Paolo Antonio Brunetti decorated the grand staircase with wall paintings depicting figures in a simulated architecture. These paintings can still be viewed in the Luynes Staircase at the Musée Carnavalet.

The apartment of Charles Louis d'Albert de Luynes, Duke of Chevreuse and Governor of Paris, was remodeled in 1767 by Pierre-Louis Moreau-Desproux. His boiserie and fireplace from the former chambre de parade of the Duke of Chevreuse was bequeathed in 1962 to the Musée du Louvre by the widow of the French industrialist Pierre Lebaudy and was refurbished and reinstalled in the Department of Decorative Arts in 2013.

The hôtel was partly destroyed in 1868, during the creation of the Boulevard Saint-Germain. The remaining sections were demolished in 1900 to make way for the Rue de Luynes and the Boulevard Raspail.

== Image gallery ==
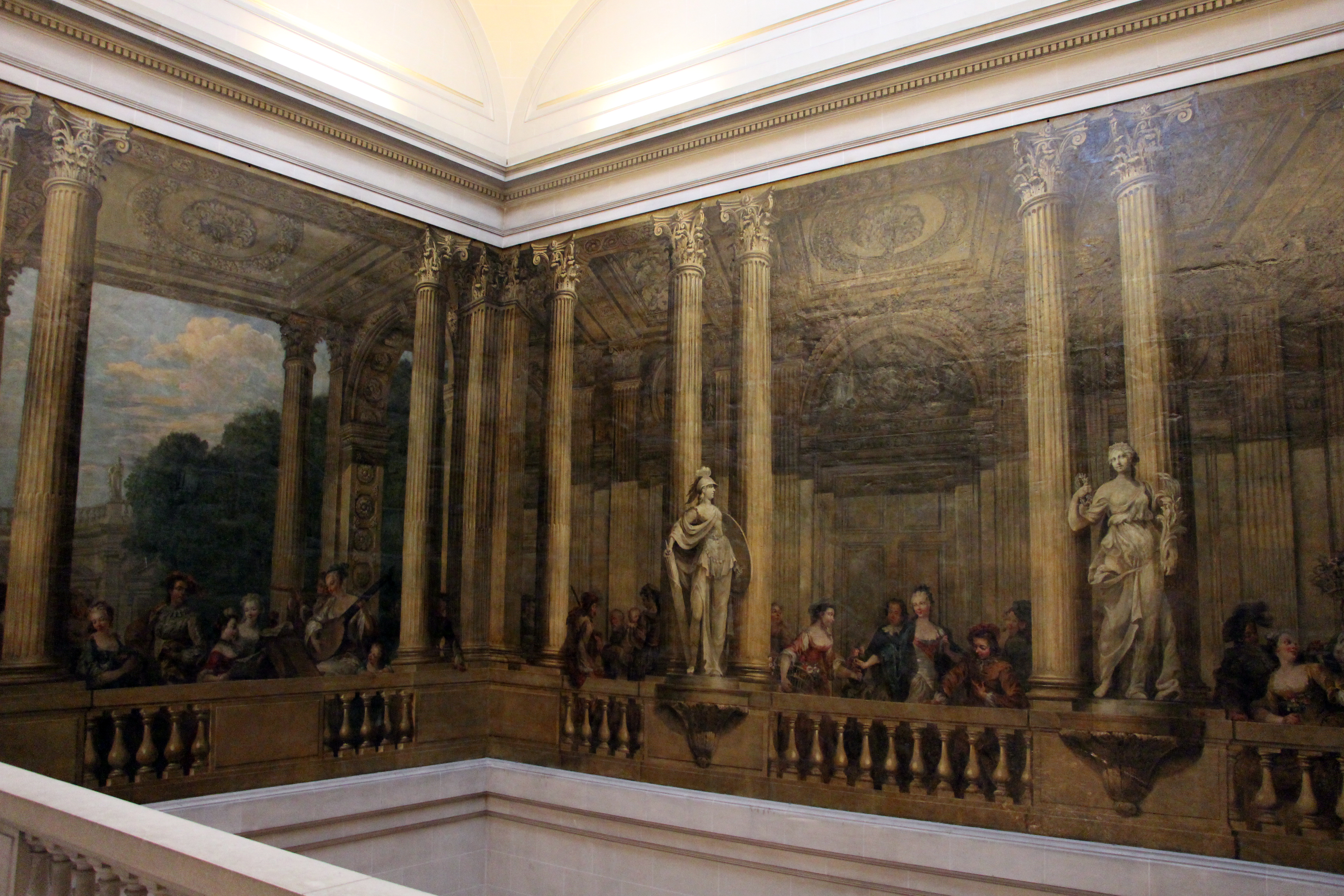
The Luynes Staircase at the Musée Carnavalet

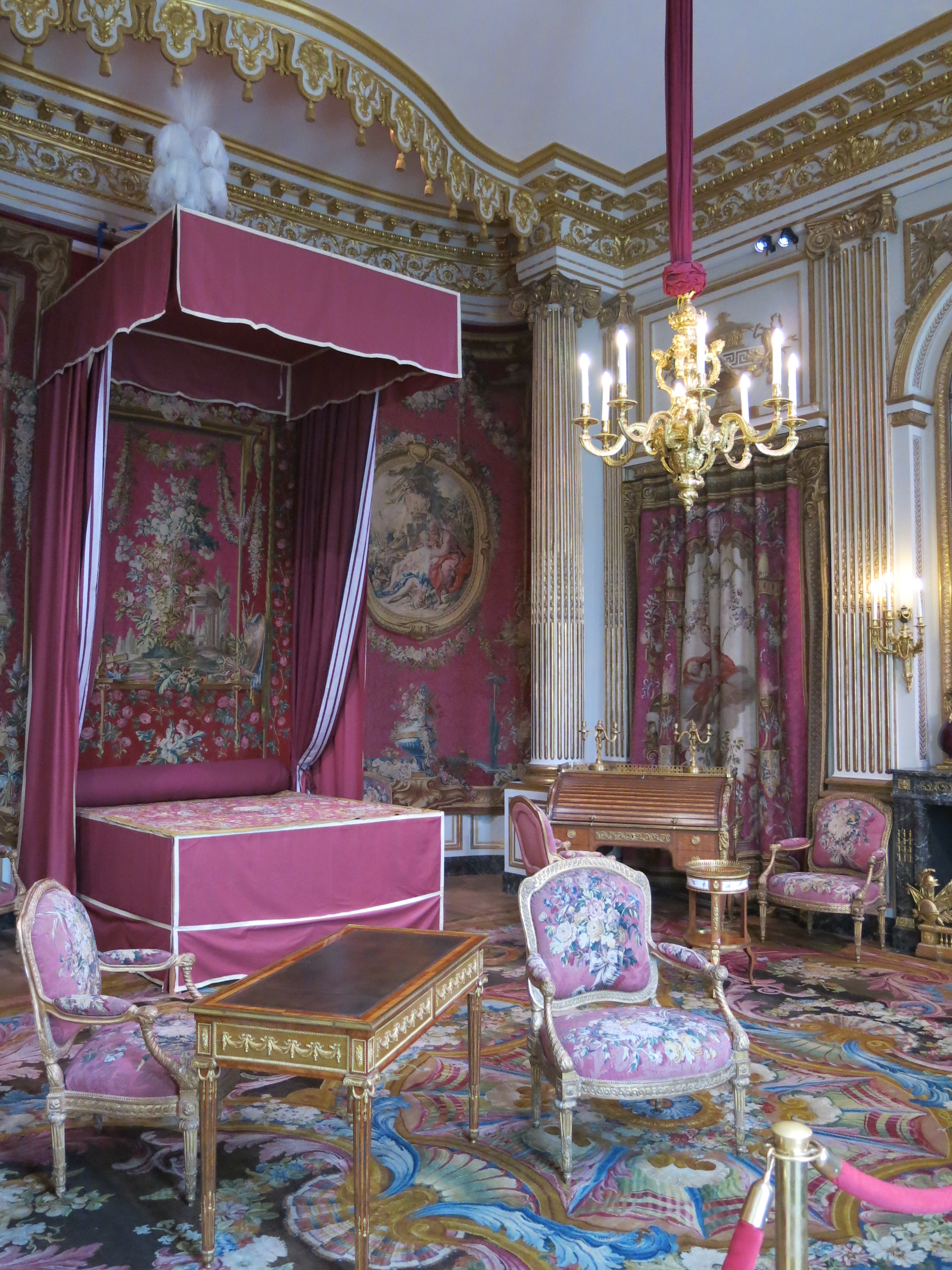
Chambre de parade of the Duke of Chevreuse at the Louvre

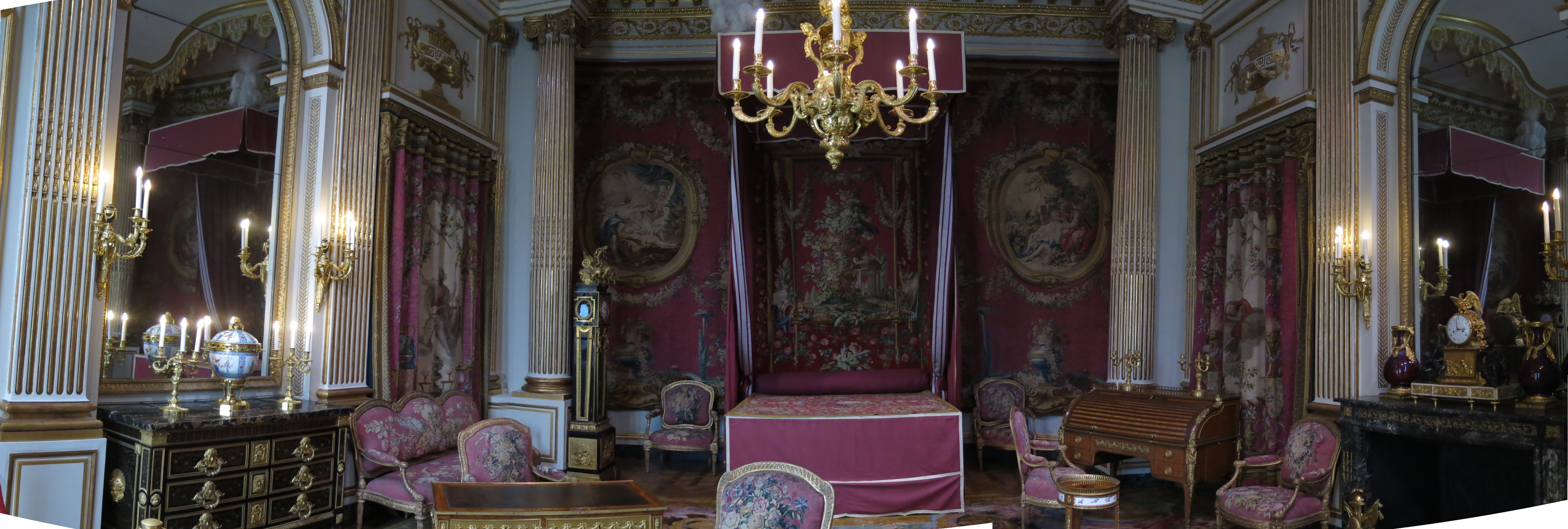
Panorama of the chambre de parade

== Bibliography ==
- Benezit (2006). Benezit Dictionary of Artists. Paris: Gründ. ISBN 9782700030709. Also at Oxford Art Online.
- Deutsch, Kristina (2015). Jean Marot : Un graveur d'architecture à l'époque de Louis XIV. Berlin: De Gruyter. ISBN 9783110375954.
- Gady, Alexandre (2012). "Boiseries Voyageuses". Tribune des Amis du Louvre.
- Mignot, Claude (1996). "Le Muet, Pierre", vol. 19, pp. 144–146, in The Dictionary of Art, 34 volumes, edited by Jane Turner, reprinted with minor corrections in 1998. New York: Grove. ISBN 9781884446009. Also at Oxford Art Online.
- Sellier, Charles (1900). L'Hôtel de Chevreuse ou de Luynes. Saint-Denis: Imprimerie H. Bouillant. Copy at Google Books.
