= Prunay Vase =

Celtic Art

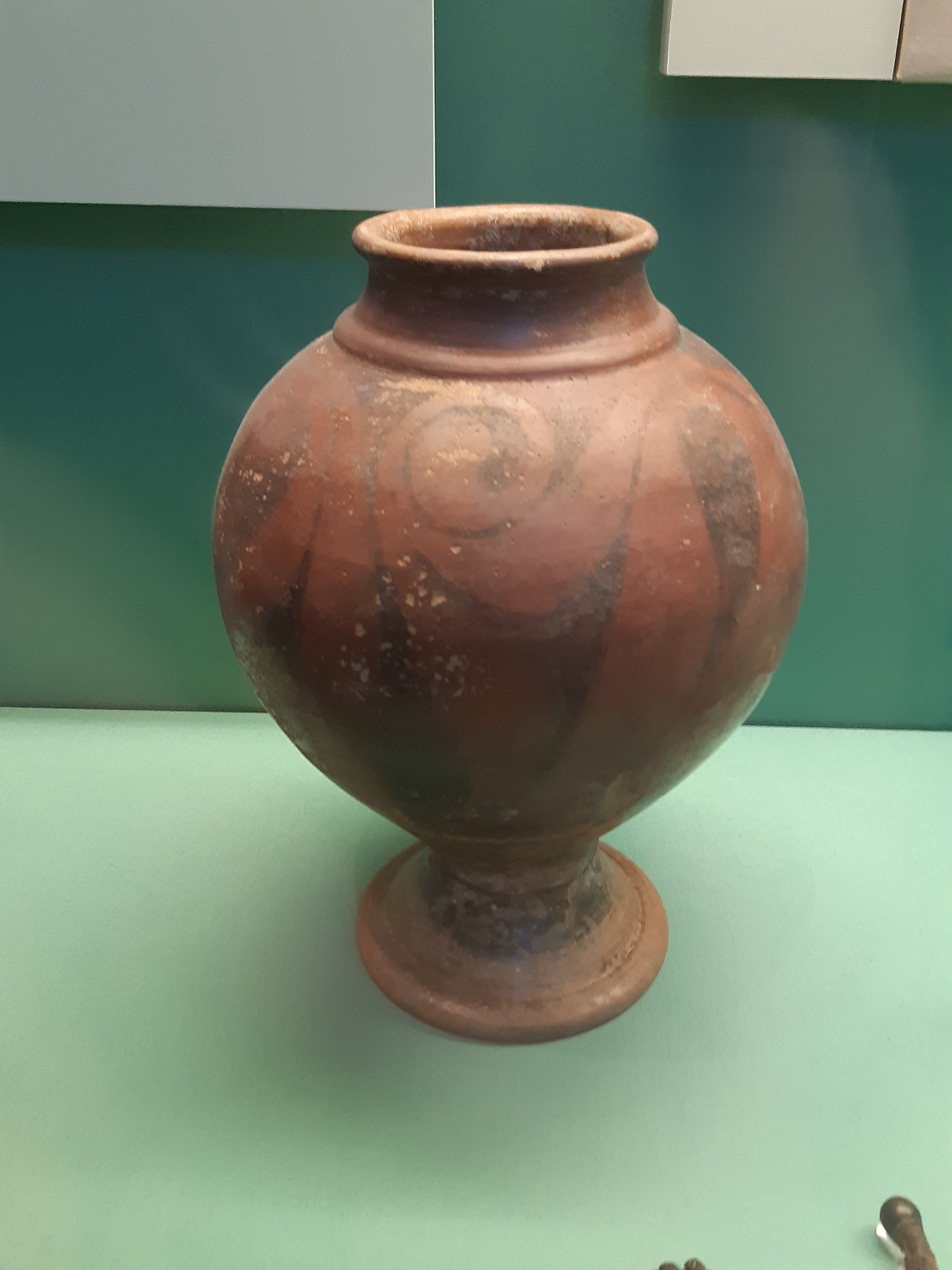
- Prunay Vase as displayed in the British Museum
- Material: Pottery
- Size: 30 cm high, 21.5 cm wide
- Created: 400-350 BC
- Discovered: Prunay, France
- Present location: British Museum, London

The Prunay Vase is a pedestal pottery vase with Celtic La Tène decoration found at Prunay, Marne in northeastern France and is one of the best preserved and most remarkable vessels of its kind extant from this period.

== Design and manufacture ==
This type of vessel is known as a pedestal jar because it sits on a pedestal shaped foot. The Prunay Vase is one of the first vessels to be made on a potter's wheel in western Europe. It was very unusual for pottery jars like this to be decorated with the swirling patterns of La Tène Celtic Art which was normally only preserved for metal objects.

The pattern on this pot is a single integrated curvilinear symmetrical design of whirligigs that covers the entire decorative zone and is repeated three times. The pot was fired to a red colour in a bonfire kiln before the pattern was painted on the jar. It was then re-fired in the kiln to turn the painted pattern black.

== Provenance ==
The vessel was found in grave 51 at la Fosse Minore cemetery, Caurel, a commune adjacent to Prunay. It was collected by the French archaeologist Léon Morel in the nineteenth century. The British Museum acquired the vase along with the rest of Morel's collection in 1901.

== Sources ==
- Stead & Rigby 1999 / The Morel Collection. Iron Age Antiquities from Champagne in the British Museum (p.49-50)
