= Nicolas Brûlart de Sillery =

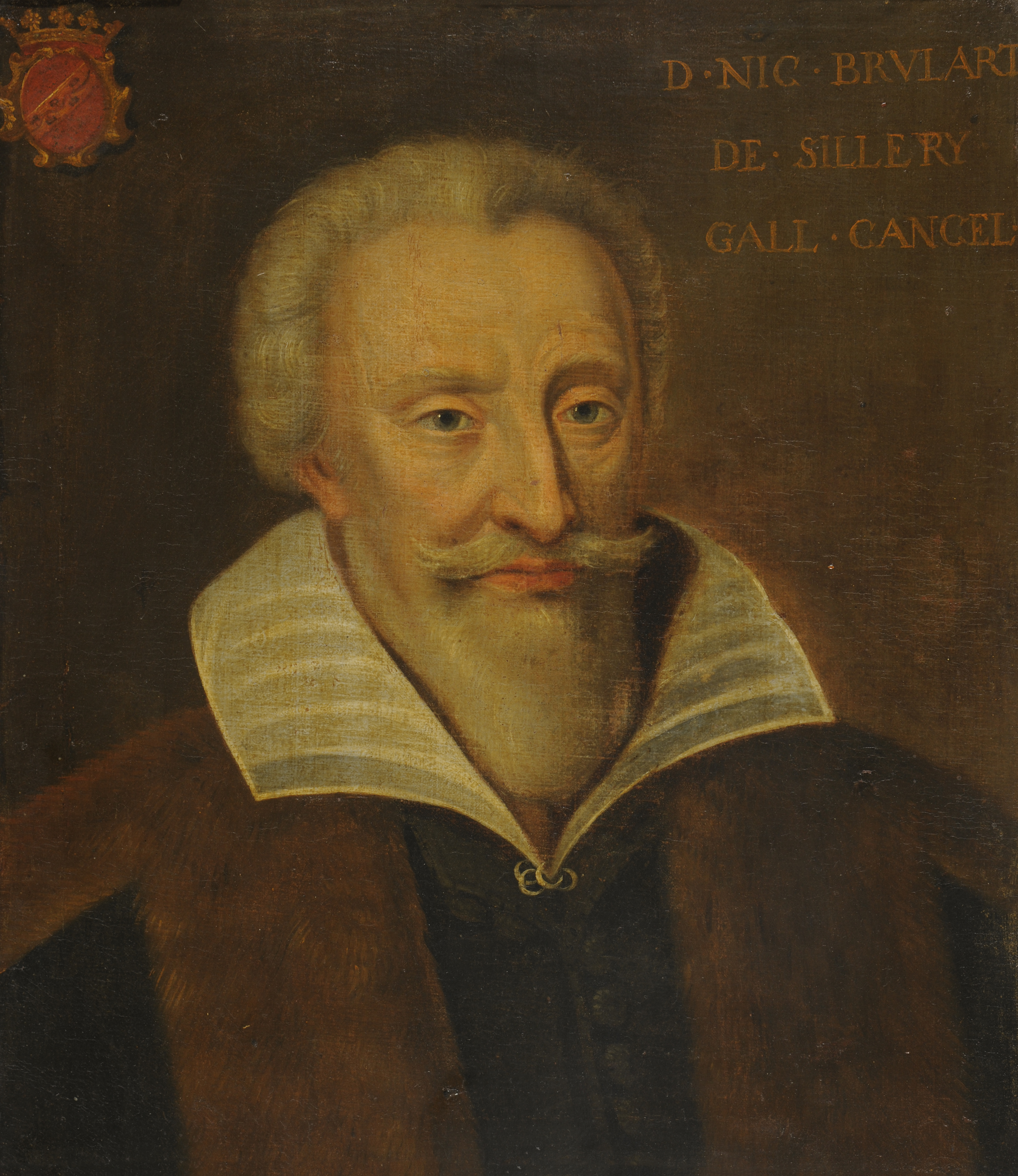

Chancellor of France
- In office 10 September 1607 – 1 October 1624
- Monarchs: Henry IV; Louis XIII
- Preceded by: Pomponne de Bellièvre
- Succeeded by: Étienne I d'Aligre

Personal details
- Born: 1544
- Died: 1 October 1624 (aged 79–80)

Nicolas Brûlart, marquis de Sillery (1544 – 1 October 1624) was a French nobleman who served as Keeper of the Seals and Chancellor of France.

== Early life ==
He was son of Pierre Brûlart, seigneur de Berny, and Marie Cauchon, dame de Sillery et de Puisieux.

== Personal life ==
He married Claude Prudhomme on 24 November 1574 and had five daughters and two sons, including Pierre Brûlart, marquis de Sillery, who was Secretary of State for Foreign Affairs from 24 April 1617 to 11 March 1626.

== Sources ==
- Bernard Barbiche & Ségolène Dainville-Barbiche, Sully, Paris, 1997.
- Gédéon Tallemant des Réaux, Historiettes, Paris, 1960, édition révisée et annotée par Antoine Adam.
- Pierre Chevallier, Louis XIII, page 690.
- Phillipe Tamizey de Larroque, Lettres de Peiresc aux frères Dupuy, paris, 1888, tome 1, page 804.
- Suzanne et René Pillorget, France baroque, France Classique, Dictionnaire, Paris, 1995, pages 173 et 174.

Preceded by Pomponne de Bellièvre	Keeper of the Seals; 1605–1607	Succeeded by Guillaume du Vair
Preceded by Pomponne de Bellièvre	Chancellor of France; 1607–1624	Succeeded by Guillaume du Vair
