= Charles Louis d'Albert, 5th Duke of Luynes =

French nobleman

Charles Louis d'Albert
- 5th Duke of Luynes; Duke of Chevreuse
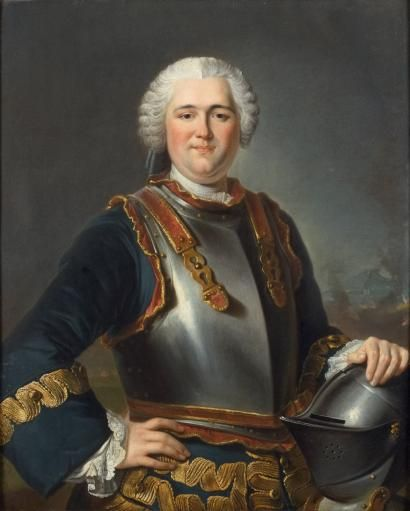
- Born: 24 April 1717; Hôtel de Luynes, France
- Died: 8 October 1771 (aged 54); Paris, France
- Noble family: House d'Albert
- Spouses: Thérèse Pelagie d'Albert, Princesse de Grimberghe (m. 1735; died 1736) Henriette Nicole d'Egmont-Pignatelli (m. 1738)
- Issue: Charles Marie Léopold d'Albert; Marie Paule Angélique d'Albert; Louis Joseph d'Albert de Luynes
- Father: Charles Philippe d'Albert, 4th Duke of Luynes
- Mother: Louise Léontine de Bourbon

Charles Louis d'Albert, 5th Duke of Luynes (Marie Charles Louis; 24 April 1717 – 8 October 1771) was a French nobleman and member of the House of Albert. He was the fifth Duke of Luynes as well as Duke of Chevreuse.

== Early life ==
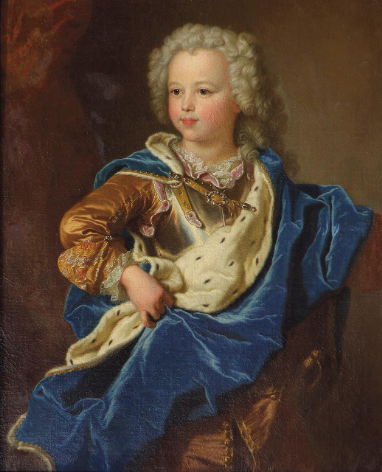
1722 portrait of Charles Louis d'Albert, Duke of Chevreuse (later Luynes) by Hyacinthe Rigaud.

Luynes was born on 24 April 1717 in Paris at the Hôtel de Luynes on the rue Saint Dominique. He was the only child of Charles Philippe d'Albert de Luynes and his wife Louise Léontine de Bourbon, he was styled the duc de Chevreuse while his father was alive. Charles Louis was the titular Duke of Montfort. Through his mother, a granddaughter of Louis Henri de Bourbon who was an illegitimate son of the Count of Soissons, Charles Louis was also the claimant to the Principality of Neuchâtel in modern-day Switzerland.

His parents were great friends of Queen Marie Leszczyńska, consort of King Louis XV. At his father's death in 1758, he succeeded to the title of Duke of Luynes.

== Career ==
He took part in the war in 1733 in the War of the Polish Succession. He also took part in campaigns in 1735 and 1745, the latter in the War of the Austrian Succession, and was injured in combat at Sahay at the head of the Dragoons. He participated in the attack of Prague in 1742, and also assisted in various sieges and battles of the era.

In 1754, he was created a Colonel General of the Dragoons. From 1757 to 1771, he was the Gouverneur de Paris (Military governor of Paris), an ancient and prestigious rank representing the king in the capital. He also was created a Knight of the Order of the Holy Spirit at Versailles on 2 February 1759.

== Personal life ==
The Duke married twice. His first marriage was to Thérèse Pélagie d'Albert on 22 January 1735; they had no issue.

After the death of his first wife, he married, secondly, to Henriette Nicole d'Egmont-Pignatelli on 27 April 1738 with whom he had three children with:

1. Charles Marie Léopold d'Albert, Count of Dunois (1740–1758), who died unmarried.
2. Marie Paule Angélique d'Albert (1744–1781) married her cousin Louis Joseph d'Albert d'Ailly, 7th Duke of Chaulnes.
3. Louis Joseph Charles Amable d'Albert, Duke of Luynes (1748–1807), who married Guyonne Élisabeth de Montmorency-Laval (aunt of Mathieu de Montmorency) and had issue.

He died in Paris in his hôtel. He was buried at the Chapelle de Saint Jean l'Évangeliste at the Église Saint-Sulpice, Paris.

== Ancestry ==
Ancestors of Charles Louis d'Albert, 5th Duke of Luynes

8. Charles Honoré d'Albert de Luynes
4. Honoré Charles d'Albert de Luynes
9. Jeanne Marie Colbert
2. Charles Philippe d'Albert de Luynes
10. Philippe de Courcillon, Marquis of Dangeau
5. Marie Anne Jeanne de Courcillon
11. Anne Françoise Morin
1. Marie-Charles-Louis d'Albert de Luynes
12. Louis de Bourbon, Count of Soissons
6. Louis Henri de Bourbon, Count of Noyers
13. Élisabeth des Hayes
3. Louise Léontine de Bourbon
14. François Henri de Montmorency, Duke of Luxembourg
7. Angélique Cunegonde de Montmorency, Mademoiselle de Luxembourg
15. Madeleine Charlotte Bonne Thérèse de Clermont-Tonnerre

French nobility
Preceded by Charles Philippe d'Albert de Luynes	Duke of Luynes; 1758–1771	Succeeded by Louis Joseph d'Albert de Luynes
