= Pierre Brûlart, marquis de Sillery =

17th century French diplomat

Pierre Brûlart

Secretary of State for Foreign Affairs & War
- In office April 1617 – March 1626
- Preceded by: Cardinal Richelieu
- Succeeded by: Raymond Phelypeaux, seigneur d'Herbault

French Ambassador to Spain
- In office 1612–1612

Personal details
- Born: 1583 Paris
- Died: 22 April 1640 (aged 56–57) Marines
- Other political affiliations: Order of Saint Michael
- Spouse(s): Magdelaine de Neufville (died 1613); Charlotte d'Estampes (1597-1677)
- Children: Charlotte (1619-1697); Louis-Roger Brûlart, Marquis de Sillery (1619-1691); Nicolas (died after 1677), Claude, Marie Eléonor (died 1687), Françoise, Eléonor Adam (died 1699)

Pierre Brûlart, Marquis de Sillery, Viscount Puisieux, Baron Grand Pressigny (1583 – 22 April 1640) served Louis XIII as joint Minister of Foreign Affairs and War from 1617 to 1626.

== Life ==
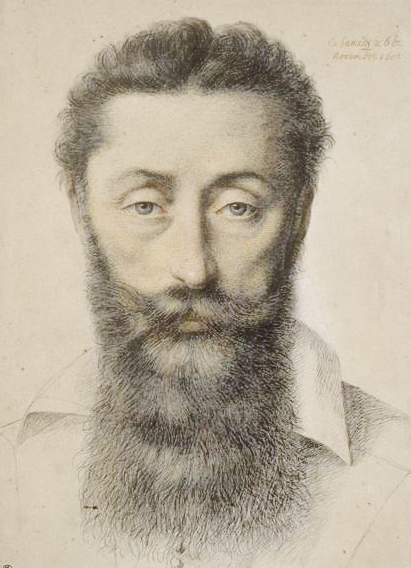
Pierre's father, Nicolas Brûlart ca 1605

Pierre Brûlart was born in 1583, son of Nicolas Brûlart, marquis de Sillery, 1544–1624 and Claude Prudhomme. His father was Chancellor of France from 1607 to 1624.

He married in 1606 Magdalena de Neufville, granddaughter of Nicolas de Neufville, who was combined Secretary of State for War & Foreign Affairs from 1567 to 1588, and again since 1594. Also in 1606, he succeeded his wife's grandfather as Secretary of State for War, but Nicolas de Neufville retained the post of Secretary of State for Foreign Affairs until 1616.

In 1613, his first wife Magdalena de Neufville died childless; his second marriage was to Charlotte d'Estampes (ca. 1597–1677) in 1615. They had seven children who survived to adulthood; Charlotte 1619–1697, Roger Louis 1619–1691, Nicolas (died after 1677), Claude, Marie Eléonor (died 1687), Françoise and Eléonor Adam (died 1699).

As was then common, only Charlotte and Roger Louis married and the other five entered religious orders. Marie Eléonor became Abbess of the Benedictine convent founded at Avenay by Bertha of Val d'Or at the end of the sixth century CE. One of the most prestigious religious institutions in Champagne, this was testimony to the family's status; it was so popular, limits were placed on the numbers accepted.

He died in April 1640 and was buried in the Chapelle du Sacré-Cœur, built in Marines by his father.

== Career ==
In 1606, he succeeded Nicolas de Neufville, his wife's grandfather, as Secretary of State for War. When Nicolas de Neufville died in 1617, and after a short period when Cardinal Richelieu was minister, he succeeded them as Foreign Affairs, a post he held until 1626.

He was also sent to Spain in 1612, as Ambassadeur extraordinaire to arrange a royal wedding.
As testimony of his activity as French ambassador in Spain, there is a mention in the text of the approval of the second part of Don Quixote by Miguel de Cervantes, signed by Francisco Márquez Torres (chaplain of the archbishop of Toledo, Bernardo de Sandoval y Rojas). The text briefly mentions his participation in the marriage agreement between the Spanish infanta (princess) Anne of Austria, daughter of King Philip III, and the French monarch Louis XIII.

== Sources ==
- Anselme de Saint Marie, Augustin, Du Forny (1730). Histoire généalogique et chronologique de la maison royale de France, des Pairs etc Volume 16. Compagnie des Libraires.
- Evergates, Theodor (1999). Aristocratic Women in Medieval France. University of Pennsylvania Press. ISBN 978-0812235036.

Political offices
| Preceded by Cardinal Richelieu | Secretary of State for Foreign Affairs; 24 April 1617 – 11 March 1626 | Succeeded by Raymond Phelypeaux, seigneur d'Herbault |
| Preceded by Nicolas de Neufville | Secretary of State for War; 4 March 1606 - 9 August 1616; 24 April 1617 - 5 February 1624 | Succeeded by Charles Le Beauclerc |
