= Fabio Brulart de Sillery =

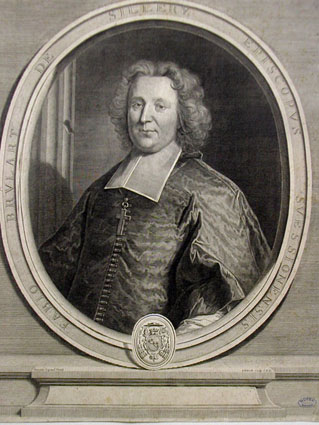

Personal details
- Born: 25 October 1655 château de Le Grand-Pressigny, France
- Died: 20 November 1714 (aged 59) Paris, France

Fabio Brulart de Sillery (25 October 1655 – 20 November 1714) was a French churchman, bishop of Avranches and bishop of Soissons.

== Biography ==
Fabio Brulart de Sillery was the great grandson of Henri de Montmorency and the godson of Pope Alexander VII, to whom he owes his Italian given name. He studied ancient Greek and Hebrew and received the title of doctor at age 26. Député to the assembly of the clergy in 1685, he became Bishop of Avranches in 1689, then of Soissons from 1692 to 1714. A member of the Académie de Soissons, he was elected a member of the Académie des inscriptions in 1701, then of the Académie française in 1705.

== Writings ==
Few of Fabio Brulart de Sillery's writings survived, including some poems and dissertations, a harangue against James II of England, a catechism, and some other texts published by François Lamy in 1700 with some by Antoine Arnauld and Dominique Bouhours under the title Réflexions sur l'éloquence.
