= Charles Philippe d'Albert, 4th Duke of Luynes =

French noble

The Duke of Luynes
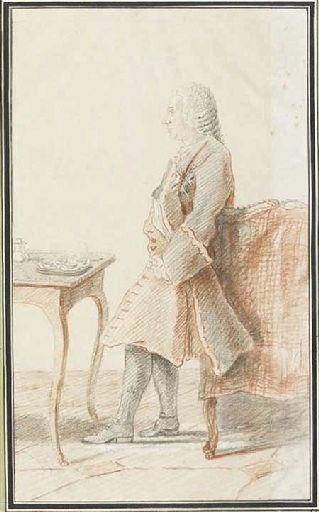
- Born: Charles Philippe d'Albert de Luynes; 30 July 1695
- Died: 2 November 1758 (aged 73); Château de Dampierre
- Spouse: Louise-Léontine de Bourbon (m. 1710; died 1721) Marie Brulart (m. 1732; died 1758)
- Issue: Marie Charles Louis d'Albert de Luynes
- Father: Honoré Charles d'Albert
- Mother: Henriette Nicole d'Egmont-Pignatelli

Charles Philippe d'Albert, 4th Duke of Luynes (30 July 1695 – 2 November 1758) held the title Duke of Luynes from 1712 to 1758. He wrote an important memoir of life at the court of Louis XV.

== Life ==
Charles Philippe the son of Honoré Charles d'Albert and Henriette Nicole d'Egmont-Pignatelli.

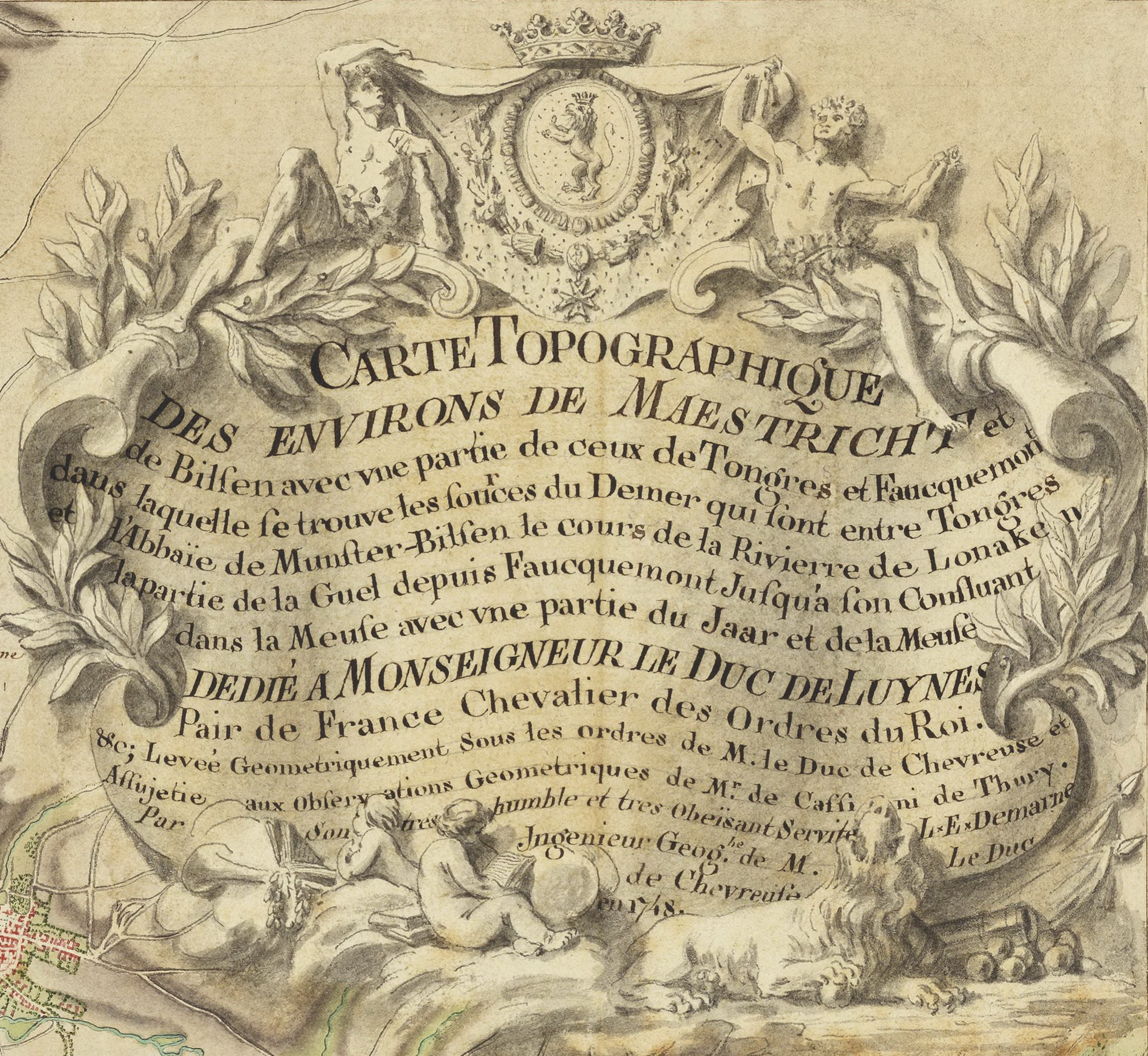
Dedication to the Duke of Luynes after the Siege of Maastricht (1748)

Luynes was a Peer of France and cavalry officer. He was part of the intimate group that she called her "gentlefolk" (honnêtes gens). He wrote a journal of historic events and facts about the court, a work which has no pretension of literary merit, but is valuable as a document for the study of the aristocratic society of his time.

== Marriage & issue ==
Charles Philippe married Louise-Léontine de Bourbon, Princess of Neuchatel. They had:

- Marie Charles Louis d'Albert de Luynes (1717–1771), who married Thérèse Pélagie d'Albert in 1735.

In 1732, Charles Philippe married Marie Brulart, she became lady-in-waiting to the Queen Maria Leszczyńska, the consort of King Louis XV.

Charles Philippe died at the Château de Dampierre and was buried at the Église Saint-Sulpice, Paris.
