= Meursanges =

- Commune
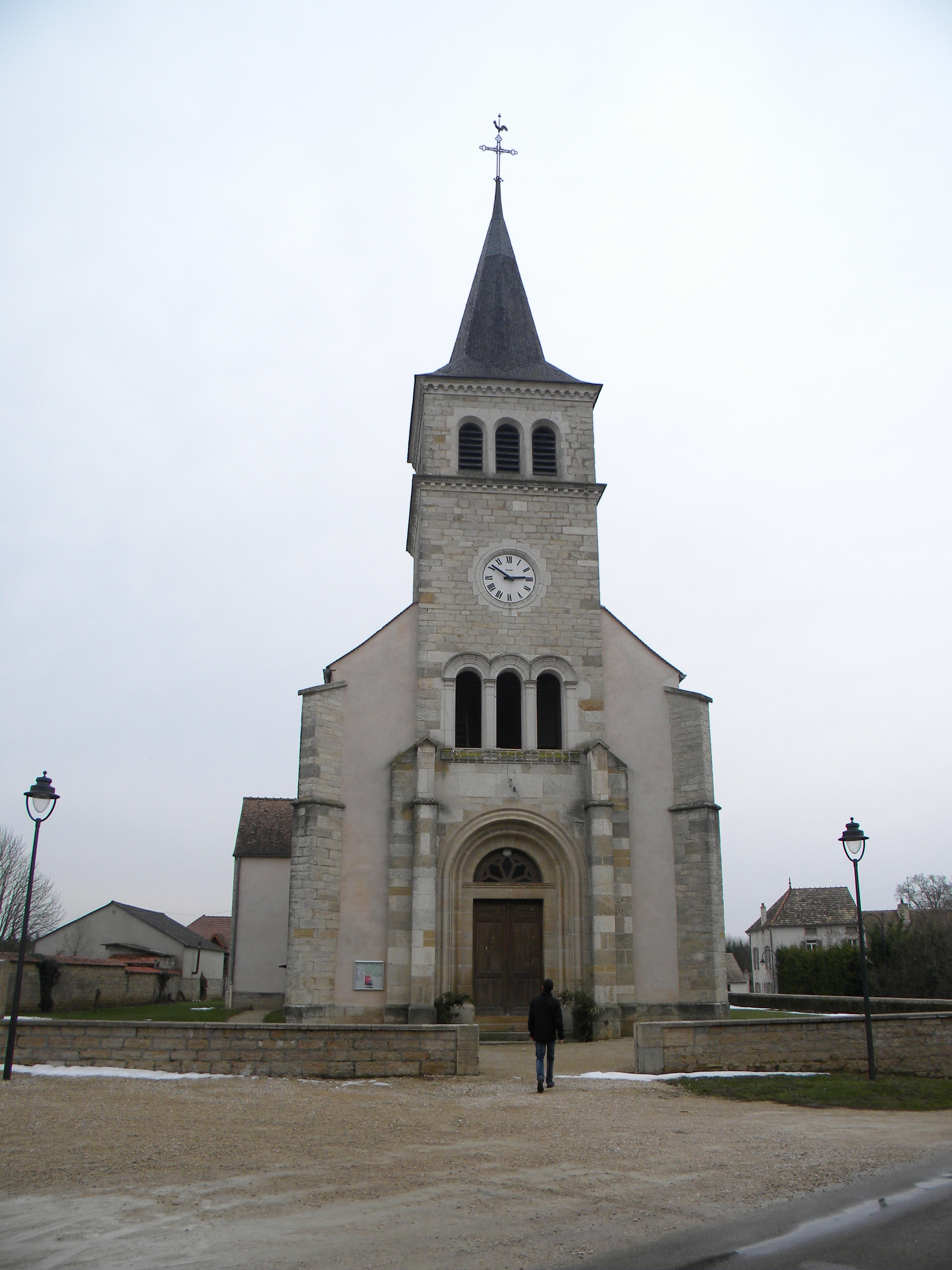
- The church in Meursanges
- Location of Meursanges
- Location within France Location within Bourgogne-Franche-Comté
- Coordinates: 46°59′31″N 4°56′45″E
- Country: France
- Region: Bourgogne-Franche-Comté
- Department: Côte-d'Or
- Arrondissement: Beaune
- Canton: Ladoix-Serrigny
- Intercommunality: CA Beaune Côte et Sud

Government
  - Mayor (2020–2026): Jean-Paul Roy
- Area^{1}: 14.26 km^{2} (5.51 sq mi)
- Highest elevation: 204 m (669 ft)
- Lowest elevation: 178 m (584 ft)
- Population (2023): 591
  - Density: 41.4/km^{2} (107/sq mi)
- Time zone: UTC+01:00 (CET)
  - Summer (DST): UTC+02:00 (CEST)
- INSEE/Postal code: 21411 /21200
- ^{1} French Land Register data, which excludes lakes, ponds, glaciers > 1 km^{2} (0.386 sq mi or 247 acres) and river estuaries.

Meursanges (French pronunciation: [mœʁsɑ̃ʒ]) is a commune in the Côte-d'Or department in eastern France.

== Population ==
Historical population
| Year | Pop. | ±% p.a. |
|---|---|---|
| 1968 | 262 | — |
| 1975 | 242 | −1.13% |
| 1982 | 285 | +2.36% |
| 1990 | 312 | +1.14% |
| 1999 | 364 | +1.73% |
| 2007 | 456 | +2.86% |
| 2012 | 510 | +2.26% |
| 2017 | 557 | +1.78% |
| 2023 | 591 | +0.99% |
Source: INSEE

== See also ==
- Communes of the Côte-d'Or department
