= Puisieulx =

- Commune
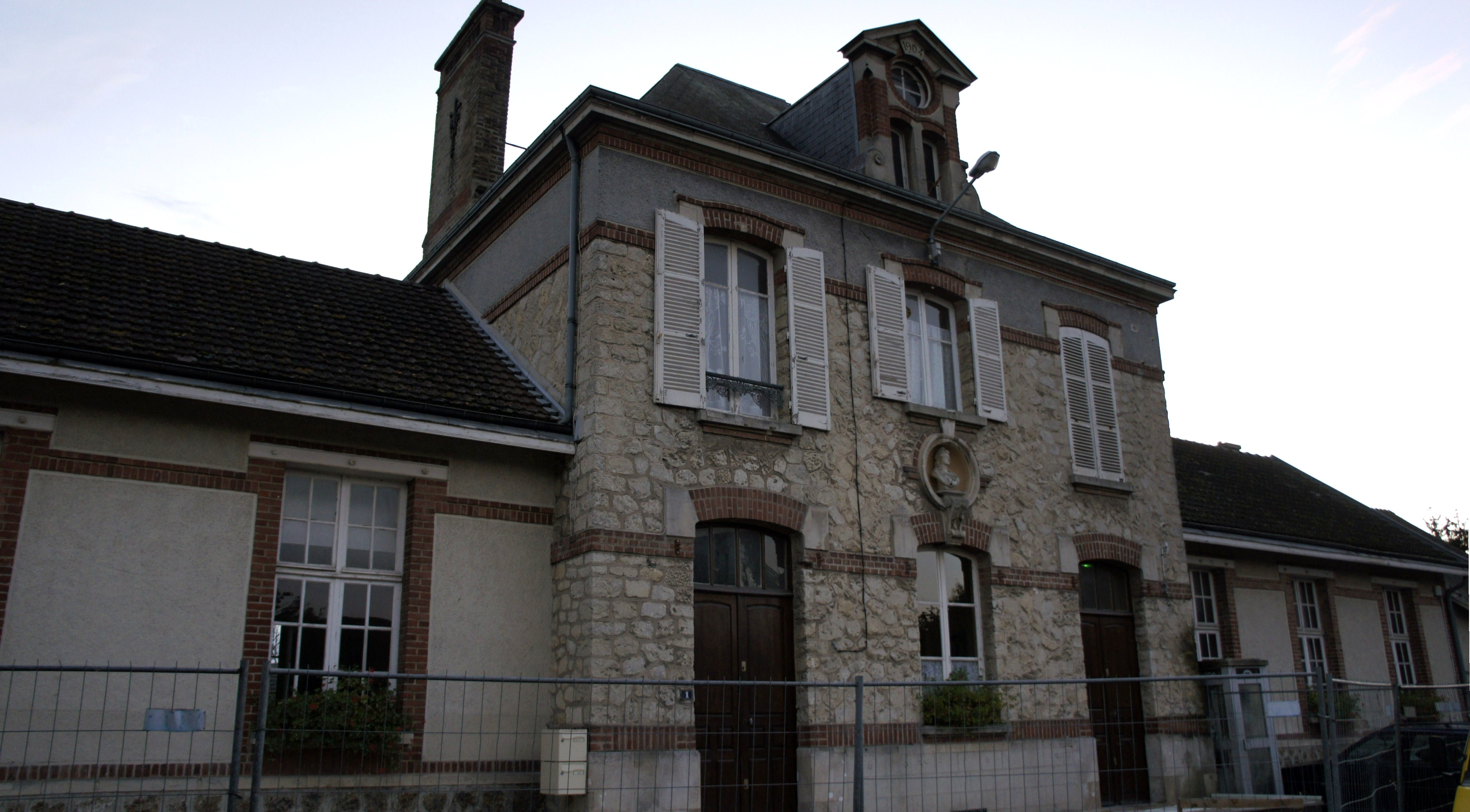
- The town hall in Puisieulx
- Location of Puisieulx
- Location within France Location within Grand Est
- Coordinates: 49°11′38″N 4°06′51″E
- Country: France
- Region: Grand Est
- Department: Marne
- Arrondissement: Reims
- Canton: Reims-8
- Intercommunality: CU Grand Reims

Government
  - Mayor (2020–2026): André Secondé
- Area^{1}: 9.07 km^{2} (3.50 sq mi)
- Highest elevation: 148 m (486 ft)
- Lowest elevation: 81 m (266 ft)
- Population (2023): 466
  - Density: 51.4/km^{2} (133/sq mi)
- Time zone: UTC+01:00 (CET)
  - Summer (DST): UTC+02:00 (CEST)
- INSEE/Postal code: 51450 /51500
- ^{1} French Land Register data, which excludes lakes, ponds, glaciers > 1 km^{2} (0.386 sq mi or 247 acres) and river estuaries.

Puisieulx (French pronunciation: [pɥizjø]) is a commune in the Marne department in north-eastern France.

== Champagne ==
The village's vineyards are located in the Montagne de Reims subregion of Champagne, and are classified as Grand Cru (100%) in the Champagne vineyard classification.

== See also ==
- Communes of the Marne department
- Classification of Champagne vineyards
