= Rouvres-sur-Aube =

- Commune
- Location of Rouvres-sur-Aube
- Location within France Location within Grand Est
- Coordinates: 47°51′30″N 4°59′44″E
- Country: France
- Region: Grand Est
- Department: Haute-Marne
- Arrondissement: Langres
- Canton: Villegusien-le-Lac
- Intercommunality: Auberive Vingeanne et Montsaugeonnais

Government
  - Mayor (2020–2026): Gilles Simon
- Area^{1}: 20.18 km^{2} (7.79 sq mi)
- Elevation: 293 m (961 ft)
- Highest elevation: 429 m (1,407 ft)
- Lowest elevation: 277 m (909 ft)
- Population (2023): 72
  - Density: 3.6/km^{2} (9.2/sq mi)
- Time zone: UTC+01:00 (CET)
  - Summer (DST): UTC+02:00 (CEST)
- INSEE/Postal code: 52439 /52160
- ^{1} French Land Register data, which excludes lakes, ponds, glaciers > 1 km^{2} (0.386 sq mi or 247 acres) and river estuaries.

Rouvres-sur-Aube (French pronunciation: [ʁuvʁ syʁ ob], literally Rouvres on Aube) is a commune in the Haute-Marne department in north-eastern France.

== See also ==
- Communes of the Haute-Marne department
