= Ram Sahai (tabla player) =

Indian tabla player (1780–1826)

- Born: 1780; Benares (Varanasi), India
- Died: 1826 (aged 45–46)
- Occupation: Tabla player
- Known for: Founder of the Benares gharana

Ram Sahai (1780–1826) was an Indian tabla player and the founder of the Benares gharana. He was born in Benares and trained under Modhu Khan of the Lucknow gharana from the age of nine. After performing in Benares, he developed a unique style of tabla playing that led to the formation of the Benares gharana, which became an influential gharana in Indian classical music.

== Biography ==
Ram Sahai was born in 1780 in Kashi (now Varanasi). His father, Prakash Sahai, and grandfather, Siya Sahai, were from Gopalpur village in Jaunpur. His uncle, Prayag Sahai, worked at the court of the Nawab of Ayodhya and later in Lucknow. Ram Sahai's siblings Janki, Gauri, and Ishwari Sahai were all Kathak dancers.

He began learning tabla at the age of five under the tutelage of his father. At the age of nine, he moved to Lucknow and became a disciple of Modhu Khan, the founder of the Lucknow Gharana. Under Modhu Khan's mentorship, Ram Sahai developed his tabla skills and learned the nuances of the Lucknow style. When he was seventeen, he was invited by Wazir Ali Khan, the newly appointed Nawab, to perform a recital. Modhu Khan agreed to this on the condition that Sahai would not be interrupted during the performance. It is said that Ram Sahai performed for seven consecutive nights, which earned him recognition in the community.

After years of studying the Lucknow style, Sahai returned to Benares, where he felt the need to create a more versatile style of tabla playing. He spent six months in seclusion, experimenting with different techniques. This intense practice led to the creation of the Benares Gharana (or Benares Baj), a new style that would become one of the most influential forms of tabla music. The core philosophy behind the Benares style was to create a tabla playing method adaptable to various musical and dance forms, including both delicate music such as khyal (vocal classical music) and more vigorous genres like dhrupad and kathak dance.

Sahai used a curved ring finger for the Na stroke on the dahina (left-hand drum), which became part of the Benares style. He composed in traditional forms like gats, tukras, and parans, and introduced compositions like uthan, the Benares theka, and fard.

== Legacy ==
The Benares Gharana has two main branches: one from Sahai's lineage, known as pure Benares and the other influenced by Kanthe Maharaj, particularly in Kathak dance. Prominent contemporary exponents include Anokhelal Mishra, Kishen Maharaj, and Sharda Sahai.
