= List of French marquesses =

Heraldic depiction of the coronet of a marquis

This is a list of French marquesses (French: marquisats de France) of the Ancien Régime, created by letters patent granted by a sovereign and, for the most part, seated on a fief. Also included are marquis titles granted in the 19th century, although the fiefs were no longer, and a large number of majorats have become financial and no longer landed.

== History ==
Authentic titles are understood to mean titles erected by letters patent of the Sovereign (the King, or the Emperor Napoleon III, or possibly a foreign sovereign whose lands have become French), registered or published with a court of justice or sovereign (parliament, court of auditors, etc.), or even subordinate, which gives them a legal and permanent status. These marquisates are in bold. The particular case of unregistered letters is studied below.

Patents differ from simple patents (such as that of the Marquise de Pompadour) and other titles of honor, which are purely formal, most often lifelong, do not need to be verified or registered, and which, therefore, cannot be imposed on the parties concerned. Some fiefs having been erected several times for various families, these confirmations can receive a serial number. Courtesy titles should not appear in the list. The papal nobility was only admitted before the Revolution, the Popes being then sovereigns of the Comtat Venaissin and Avignon: they would have created 26 hereditary marquis titles on their lands located in France. Later titles, awarded by the Popes as foreign sovereigns, are excluded.

At the end of the Ancien Régime, a large number of noble families – or so-called noble families – with a certain social standing, bore a courtesy title of count or marquis, unduly taken up or invented. In the absence of an official census, there is no clear boundary between unfinished (unregistered) titles, those called courtesy titles, and the purely fanciful titles that flourish in all eras, including today.

== List of marquesses ==
Marquis	Province	Department	Creation	Family	Status	Notes
Abos*, alias Binanville	Île-de-France	Yvelines, Arnouville-lès-Mantes	1689 (brevet), 1718 (LP)	Abos de Binanville (d')	Extinct 1809	
Achères	Île-de-France	Seine-et-Marne, Achères-la-Forêt	1680	Argouges (d')	Sold 1786	
Achy	Picardy	Oise, Achy	1664	Carvoisin (de)	Extinct 1837	
Acigné	Bretagne	Ille-et-Vilaine, Acigné	1609	Cossé-Brissac (de)	Sold 1657, Extinct 1812	
Acy or Assy	Île-de-France	Oise, Acy-en-Multien	1668	Rouhault or Rouault de Gamaches	Sold 1719	
Agrain	Velay	Haute-Loire, Ouides	1760 (brevet)	Pradier de Mons (de)	Extant	
Agrain	Bourgogne	Sâone-et-Loire, Bressey-sur-Tille	1826	Pradier de Mons (de)	Extant	
Aguesseau	Île-de-France	Seine-et-Marne, Fresnes-sur-Marne	1817	Aguesseau (d')	Extinct 1826	
Aguilar	Languedoc	Aude, Tuchan	1648	Margarit de Biure (de)	Extinct 1838	
l'Aigle	Normandie	Orne, L'Aigle (formerly Laigle)	1650	Acres de l'Aigle (des)	Extinct 1996	
Aigremont	Flandre	Nord, Ennevelin	1773	Jacops d'Aigremont	Extant	
Aigueblanche	Savoie	Savoie, Aigueblanche	1680	Carron de Saint-Thomas	Extinct	
Airvault, alias Hervault 1	Poitou	Deux-Sèvres, Airvault	1651	Ysoré (d')	Sold 1677, Extinct 1917	
Airvault, alias Hervault 2	Poitou	Deux-Sèvres, Airvault	1678	Darrot de la Poupelinière	Sold 1785, Extinct 1917	
Aix	Savoie	Savoie, Aix-les-Bains	1575	La Chambre-Seyssel (de)	Extinct 1660; raised and still used by another branche	
Aizenay	Poitou	Vendée, Aizenay	b1660	La Tour d'Aizenay (de)	Extinct 1814	
Alauzier	Comtat-Venaissin	Vaucluse	1741	Ripert de Fabry d'Alauzier (de)	Extant	
Albert* (Ancre 2)	Picardy	Somme, Albert	1620	Albert de Luynes (d')	Sold 1695 / Extant	
Albertas*	Provence	Bouches-du-Rhône, Bouc-Bel-Air	1767, 1817	Albertas (d')	Extinct 2006	
Albon	Lyonnais	Rhône, Saint-Romain de Popey	1820, 1828	Albon de Saint-Marcel (d')	Extinct 2015	
Alby	Savoie	Haute-Savoie, Alby-sur-Chéran	1681	Maillard de Tournon	Extinct 1819	
Alègre or Allègre	Velay	Haute-Loire, Allègre	1576	[de Tourzel] Alègre (d')	Sold 1766, Extinct 1797	
Alembon	Artois	Pas-de-Calais, Alembon	1650	Roussé (de)	Extinct 1822	
Aligre*	Aunis	Charente-Maritime, Marans	1777, 1825	Aligre (d')	Extinct 1889	
Alincourt or Alaincourt	Île-de-France	Oise, Parnes	1610	Neufville de Villeroi (de)	Duchy 1729, Sold 1733, Extinct 1831	
Alleyns or Alein	Provence	Bouches-du-Rhône Alleins	1695, 1714	Renaud d'Allins (de)	Extinct 1872	
Allemogne 1	Pays-de-Gex	Ain, Thoiry	1722	Livron (de) then Brisson	Sold	
Allemogne 2	Pays-de-Gex	Ain, Thoiry	1769	Conzié (de)	Extinct 1833	
Alluyes	Perche-Gouët	Eure-et-Loir, Alluyes	1591	Escoubleau de Sourdis (d')	Sold 1714, County 1768	
Alphonse	Languedoc	31	1865	Alphonse (d')	Extinct 1870	
Ambert	Auvergne	Puy-de-Dôme, Ambert	c1785	Merle de Beauchamps (de)	Extinct 1798	
Amblimont	Champagne	Ardennes, Amblimont	1675	Renart de Fuchsamberg	Extinct 1797	
Ambly (sur Bar)	Champagne	Ardennes, Vendresse	c1660, 1768	Ambly (d')	Extinct 1869	
Ambres	Albigeois	Tarn, Ambres	c1600	Gélas de Léberon (de)	Extinct 1794	barons d'États d'Albigeois
Amfreville	Normandie	Manche, Amfreville	1653	Davy d'Amfreville	Extinct 1849	
Amou	Gascogne	Landes, Amou	1664	Caupenne d'Amou (de)	Extant	
Amy	Picardy	Oise, Amy	1678	Scarron	Extinct 1681	
Ancre (1) or Encre	Picardy	Somme, Albert	1576	Humières (d')	Sold 1610	1620 confirmed with new name, Albert
Andelarre	Franche-Comté	Haute-Sâone, Andelarre	1760	Jacqüot d'Andelarre (de)	Name change 1777	Changed name to Jacqüot d'Andelarre
Andelot (1)	Franche-Comté	Jura, Andelot-Morval	1617	Coligny (de)	Sold 1702	
Andelot (2)	Franche-Comté	Jura, Andelot-Morval	1744	Guyennard d'Andelot	Extinct 1827	
Andrésy	Île-de-France	Yvelines, Andrésy	c1650	l'Isle d'Andrésy (de) (rameau de l'Isle-Adam)	Sold 1674 + 1679	
Anduze	Languedoc	Gard, Anduze	1078	Pelet d'Anduze	Dissolved 1226	
Anduze	Languedoc	Gard, Anduze	1645	Folquier d'Airebaudouze	Sold 1760 + 1780	
Angerville	Normandie	Seine-Maritime, Angerville-l'Orcher	1742 (brevet), 1864 (DI)	Angerville d'Auvrecher (d')	Extant	
Anglade	Guyenne	Gironde, Anglade	1788	Anglade (d')	Extant	Probably courtesy title
Anglure (1)	Champagne	Marne, Anglure	1657	Braux (de)	Sold c1724	
Anglure (2)	Champagne	Marne, Anglure	1682	Savigny d'Anglure (de)	Sold c1724	
Anguitard	Poitou	Vienne, Poitiers	c1650	Poussard du Vigean	Extinct 1748	
Annebault	Normandie	Calvados, Appeville-Annebault	1643	Potier de Blérancourt	Sold 1723	
Annonay	Vivarais	Ardèche, Annonay	1620	Lévis-Ventadour (de)	Extinct 1830	
Antigny	Bourgogne	Côte-d'Or, Foissy	1654	Damas d'Antigny (de)	Extinct 1908	
Antin	Bigorre	Hautes-Pyrénées, Antin	1615	Pardaillan de Gondrin (de)	Duchy 1711–1757, Sold 1787	
Aoust-Jumelles*	Flandre	Nord, Cuincy	1739	Aoust de Cuinchy (d')	Extinct 1845	
Apreville	Bretagne	Côtes-d'Armor, Quimper-Guézennec	c1660 (brevet)	Bourblanc (du)	Extinct 1839	
Aquéria alias Rochegude	Languedoc	Gard, Tavel	1742	Robert d'Aquéria (de)	Extinct 1940	
Aragon	Languedoc	Aude, Aragon	1697	Maurel d'Aragon (de)	Extant	
Aramon	Languedoc	Gard, Aramon	c1650	Sauvan d'Aramon (de)	Extant	
Arbouville	Orléanais	Eure-et-Loire, Rouvray-St.Denis	1756 (brevet)	Chambon d'Arbouville (de)	Extinct 1794	
Arc (-en-Barrois) (1)	Champagne	Haute-Marne, Arc-en-Barrois	1578	Bauffremont (de)	Sold 1622	
Arc (-en-Barrois) (2)	Champagne	Haute-Marne, Arc-en-Barrois	1650	l'Hôpital-Vitry (de)	Sold 1679	
Arc (-en-Barrois) (3)	Champagne	Haute-Marne, Arc-en-Barrois	1703	Bourbon-Penthièvre (de)	Extant	
Arc-sur-Tille	Bourgogne	Côte-d'Or, Arc-sur-Tille	b1670	Saulx-Tavannes (de)	Extinct 1845	
Arcelot (1)	Bourgogne	Côte-d'Or, Arceau	1674	Guéribout (de)	Sold 1711	
Arcelot (2)	Bourgogne	Côte-d'Or, Arceau	1697	Massuau (de)	Sold 1711, Extinct 1870	
Arces	Dauphiné	Isère, Saint-Ismier	1784 (brevet)	Morard d'Arces (de)	Extant?	
Archiac	Saintonge	Charente-Maritime, Archiac	1609	Bourdeille (de)	Extinct 1837	
les Arcis	Maine	Mayenne, Meslay-du-Maine	16xx	Cervon (de)	Sold c1770	
Les Arcs	Provence	Var, les Arcs	1612	Villeneuve (de)	Sold 17xx, Extinct 1814	
Arcy (1)	Bourgogne	Saône-et-Loire, Vindecy	c1580	Guillart (de)	Sold 1719. Extinct 1804	
Arcy (2)	Bourgogne	Saône-et-Loire, Vindecy	a1682	Valadoux d'Arcy (de)	Sold 1719. Extinct 1804	
Aresches (1)	Franche-Comté	Aresches	1717	Coquelin	1739	
Argence	Angoumois	Charente, Champniers	1707	Achard-Joumard-Tison	Extinct 2017	
Argens	Provence	Alpes-de-Haute-Provence, la Mure-Argens	1722	Boyer d'Argens (de)	Extinct 1956	
Argenson	Touraine	Indre-et-Loire, Maillé	1700	Voyer de Paulmy (de)	Extant	
Argenteuil	Champagne	Yonne, Argenteuil-sur-Armancon	c1720	le Bascle d'Argenteuil	Extinct a1825	
Argenton	Poitou	Deux-Sèvres, Argenton-Château	1625	Châtillon d'Argenton (de)	Extinct 1840	
Arifat	Albigeois	Tarn, Arifat	b1721	Soubiran (de)	Extinct 1878	
Armentières	Picardy	Aisne, Armentières-sur-Ourcq	c1630	Conflans d'Oulchy (de)	Extinct 1849	
Armolis*	Artois	Pas-de-Calais, Avion	1771	Roergas d'Armolis	Extinct 1803	
Arpajon*	Île-de-France	Essonne, Arpajon	1720	Arpajon (d')	Extant	
Arques (1)	Languedoc	Aude, Arques	c1575 (brevet)	Joyeuse (de)	Sold 1646	
Arques (2)	Languedoc	Aude. Arques	1651	Rébé (de)	Sold 1732 + 1746, Extinct 1814	
Ars	Angoumois	Charente, Ars	1652 (brevet)	Brémond d'Ars (de)	Extant	
Ars	Berry	Indre, Montlevicq	c1510	Ars (d')	Sold 1545	
Arvillard (La Bâtie d')	Dauphiné	Isère, la Chapelle-du-Bard	1739	Barral de Clermont (de)	Extant	
Arvillars	Savoie	Savoie, Arvillard	1678	Milliet d'Arvillars	Extinct 1909	
Arvisenet	Franche-Comté		1724, 1725	Arvisenet (d')	Extinct 1789	Never connected to a fief
Asfeld*	Champagne	Ardennes, Asfeld	1730	Bidal d'Asfeld	Extinct 1793	
Asnières	Marche	Vienne, Asnières-sur-Blour	1745 (brevet)	Guiot d'Asnières	Extinct 1881	
Asnières*-de-la-Châtaigneraye	Poitou	Vendée, La Chataigneraie	1776	Asnières de la Châtaigneraye (d')	Extinct 1892	
Assérac or Acérac	Bretagne	Loire Atlantique, Assérac	1574	Rieux-Assérac (de)	Sold 1656, 1679, Extinct 1794	
Assy	Normandie	Calvados, Ouilly-le-Tesson	1762	Morell d'Aubigny (de)	Extant	
Atilly	Île-de-France	Seine-et-Marne, Férolles-Attilly	1668	Bernard (de)	Sold 1683; Extinct 1795	
Aubais	Languedoc	Gard, Aubais	1724	Baschi d'Aubais (de)	Extinct 1927	
Aubepeyre	Limousin	Creuse, Saint-Yrieix-la-Montagne	c1713	Turenne d'Aubepeyre (de)	Extinct 1950	
Aubeterre	Angoumois	Charente, Aubeterre-sur-Dronne	1611	Esparbès de Lussan (d')	Extinct 1947	
Aubignan	Comtat-Venaissin	Vaucluse, Aubignan	1667	Panisse-Pazzi (de)	Extant	
Aubigny	Normandie	Calvados, Aubigny	Louis XVI	Morell d'Aubigny (de)		
Aubigny	Poitou	Deux-Sèvres, Aubigny	c1670	Châtelet-Clémont (du)	Sold 1744	
Aubijoux	Auvergne	Cantal, Marcenat	1561 (brevet), 1565	Amboise (d')	Extinct	Owners used title "comte d'Aubijoux"
Aulan	Dauphiné	Drôme, Aulan	1532	Suarez (de)	Extinct 1796	Title raised by family Harouard
Aulnay (-lès-Bondy)	Île-de-France	Seine-Saint-Denis, Aulnay-sous-Bois	1683	Gourgue (de)	Extinct 1949	
Aurimont	Armagnac	Gers, Aurimont	1690	Griffolet d'Aurimont (de)	Extinct 1914	
Aussonne	Languedoc	Haute-Garonne, Aussonne	1676	Buisson d'Aussonne (du)	Extinct 1887	
Authume	Franche-Comté	Jura, Authume	1750	Masson d'Autume (de)	Extant	
Autichamp	Dauphiné	Drôme, Autichamp	1680	Beaumont d'Autichamp (de)	Extant	Unregistered marquisate
Autry	Berry	Cher, Méreau	c1620	Estampes-Autry (d'), then Courtin	Extinct 1682 for d'Estampes and in 1813 for Courtin.	
Aux*	Maine	Sarthe, Louplande	1777	Aux de Villaines (d')	Extinct 1963	
Aux-Lally	Dauphiné	26	1815	Aux de Lescout (d')	Extant	
Auxy* alias Hanvoille alias la Grange-de-Monceaux	Picardy	Oise, Hanvoile	1687	Auxy de la Grange de Monceaux (d')	Extinct 1815	
Auzielle	Languedoc	31 Auzielle		Chalvet de Rochemonteix (de)		
Avalis	Normandie	Manche, Isigny-le-Buat	c1650	Avenel (d')	Extinct 1954	
Avaray	Blésois	Loir-et-Cher, Avaray	c1665	Bésiade (ou Béziade) d'Avaray (de)	Extinct 1941	
Avaugour	Bretagne	Côtes-d'Armor, St.Péver	c1670	Bretagne-Avaugour (de)	Extinct 1830	
Avéjan	Languedoc	Gard, Saint-Jean-de-Maruéjols	1736	Banne d'Avéjan (de)	Extinct 1876	
Avernes	Normandie	Orne, Avernes-Saint-Gourgon	Louis XIV	Bernard d'Avernes (de)	Extinct 1818	
Avèze	Languedoc	Gard, Avèze	1657	Frézals de Beaufort de Vabres (de)	Sold 1731, Extinct 1848	
Avoir	Anjou	Maine-et-Loire, Longué-Jumelles	1630	Chambes (de)	Sold 1686 + 1767	
Avremesnil	Normandie	Seine-Maritime, Avremesnil	c1660	de Pardieu	Extinct?	
Axat	Languedoc	Aude, Axat	1717 (brevet), 1740	Dax d'Axat (de)	Extinct 1788, relevé par une autre bche	
Aynac	Quercy	Lot, Aynac	1677	Turenne d'Aynac (de)	Extinct 1905	
les Ayvelles	Champagne	Ardennes, Les Ayvelles	1675	Ambly des Ayvelles (d')	Extinct 1869	
Bacquehem*	Artois	Pas-de-Calais, Vaudricourt	1765	Bacquehem (de)	Extinct 1917	
Bacqueville	Normandie	76 Bacqueville-en-Caux	c. 1715	Boyvin de Bonnetot	Extinct	
Bagé-le-Châtel	Bresse	Ain, Bagé-le-Châtel	1575	Savoie-Tende (de)	Sold 1610 + 1769, Extinct 1845	
Bagnac	Marche	Haute-Vienne, Saint-Bonnet-de-Bellac	1740	Saint-Martin de Bagnac (de)	Extinct 1892	
Baillet* (ou Givry 2)	Champagne	51 Givry-en-Argonne	1768	Baillet		
Bailly* or Bourg-Bailly	Maine	53 La Chapelle-Rainsouin	1768	Bailly (de)	Extinct	
Bains	Picardy	Oise, Boulogne-la-Grasse	c1680	Favier de Lancry	Sold 1777	
Balagny	Picardy	Oise, Balagny-sur-Thérain	c1620	Lasseran-Massencôme de Montluc (de)	Sold 1722, Extinct 1825	
Balay*	Franche-Comté	Jura, Marigna-sur-Valouse	1712	Balay (de)	Extinct 1843	
Balincourt	Île-de-France	Val-d'Oise, Arronville	1719; confirmed 1748	Testu de Balincourt	Extant	
Balleroy or La Cour*	Normandie	Calvados, Balleroy-sur-Drôme	1704	La Cour de Balleroy (de)	Extinct 1957	Possibly confirmation of an older title
La Ballue	Bretagne	Ille-et-Vilaine, Bazouges-la-Pérouse	1622	Ruellan du Tiercent de La Ballue (de)	Extinct 1819	
Balon or Ballon	Bugey	Ain, Lancrans	1760	Regard de Perrucard (de)	Extinct a1831	
Balon or Ballon	Maine	Sarthe, Ballon	1600	Saint-Gelais de Lusignan (de)	Sold 1762, Extinct 1846	
Bandeville (1)	Île-de-France	Essonne, St Cyr-sous-Dourdan	1682	Bazin	Sold 1704	
Bandeville (2)	Île-de-France	Essonne, Saint-Cyr-sous-Dourdan	1705	Doublet de Crouy	Extinct 1791, title raised by the Persan branch (Extant)	
Bantanges (1)	Bourgogne	71 Bantanges	1675	Potet	Extinct (Sold 1696)	
Bantanges (2)	Bourgogne	71 Bantanges	1696	Guyet	Extinct 1774	
Barastre alias Couronnel	Artois	Pas-de-Calais, Barastre	1771	Mailly-Couronnel (de)	Extinct 1924	
Barbantane or Barbentane	Provence	Bouches-du-Rhône, Barbantane	c1670; 1745, 1784 + 1862 (confirmations)	Puget de Cabassole du Réal (de)	Extant	
Barbentane	Provence	Bouches-du-Rhône, Barbentane	1862 + 1863	Robin de Barbentane (de)	Extant	confirmation of courtesy title from 1750
Barbezieux	Saintonge	Charente, Barbezieux-St-Hilaire	1678	Le Tellier de Louvois	Extinct 1792	
Barral	Languedoc	Gard, le Vigan	1771 + 1860	Barral d'Arènes (de)	Extinct 1950	
La Barre	Maine	Mayenne, Bierné	1633	Chivré (de)	Sold 1723, County 1735	
Barri	Comtat-Venaissin	Vaucluse, Bollène	1789	Ripert d'Alauzier	Extant	
Barrière	Périgord	Dordogne, Villamblard	c1650	Taillefer (de)	Extinct 1885	
Bartillat	Bourbonnais	Allier, Saint-Martinien	1825 + 1826	Jehannot de Bartillat	Extant	
Barville	Normandie	Eure, Thiberville	c1600	Livet de Barville (de)	Extinct 1891	
Bassecourt*	Artois	Pas-de-Calais, Auchy	1763	Bassecourt (de)	Extinct 1892	
Bassompierre*	Lorraine	Moselle, Boulange	1633	Bassompierre (de)	Extinct	
Bassompierre*	Lorraine	Vosges, Saint-Menge	1766	Bassompierre (de)	Extinct 1837	
Basville	Île-de-France	Essonne, Saint Chéron	1670	Lamoignon (de)	Extinct 1845	
La Bâtie-de-Seyssel	Savoie	Savoie, Saint-Jean-d'Arvey	1699	Oncieu de La Bâtie (d')	Extant	
Bauché	Berry	Indre, Vendœuvres	1649	Crevant-Bauché (de)	Extinct 1875	
Baudricourt	Lorraine	88 Saint-Menge	1719	Bassompierre (de)	Name change 1766, Extinct 1837	
Bauffremez*	Flandres	59 Esnes	1723	Bauffremez (de)		
La Baume-d'Hostun	Dauphiné	26 La Baume-d'Hostun	Henry IV	Hostun de Gadagne (d')	Extinct	
La Baume-Montrevel*	Franche-Comté	70 Pesmes	1754	La Baume-Montrevel (de)	Extinct 1754	
Bausset or Bausset-Roquefort	Provence	06	1736	Bausset-Roquefort (de)	Borrowed title, Extant	
Les Baux	Provence	13 Les Baux-de-Provence	1642	Grimaldi de Monaco (Grimaldi then Goyon-Matignon)	Substitution (through female line) in 1949 (House of Polignac)	
Bayers	Angoumois	16 Bayers	Louis XIV	La Rochefoucauld-Bayers (de)	Sold 1760, Branch extinct 1940	
Bayon	Lorraine	54 Bayon	1720	Ludre-Frolois (de)	Extinct 1846	
Bazillac	Bigorre	65 Bazillac	c. 1645	Audéric de Savignac (d')	Extinct 1878	
Beauchamp	Provence	Saint-Rémy-de-Provence	1659	Doni (de)	Extinct 18th century	
Beauchamp	Comtat	84	17th century	Merles de Beauchamp (de)	Extinct 1864	
Beaucourt-en-Santerre	Picardy	80 Beaucourt-en-Santerre	c. 1670	Festart (de)	Extinct 20th century	
Beaufort	Languedoc	30	mid-17th century	Frezals (de)	Extinct 1890	
Beaufort				Cassagnes de Beaufort	Extant	
Beaujeu	Berry	18 Sens-Beaujeu	mid-17th century	Mesnil-Simon (du)	Extinct 20th century	
Beaulévrier	Picardy	60 St-Quentin des Prés	1687	Espinay Saint-Luc (d')		
Beaumanoir*, then Bouhier-Lantenay	Bourgogne	21 Lantenay	1677	Bouhier de Lantenay	Extinct 1746; Renewed for a nephew (Extinct 1797)	
Beaumesnil	Normandie	27 Beaumesnil	1604			
Beaumont-la-Ronce	Touraine	37 Beaumont-la-Ronce	1757	Bonnin de La Bonninière (de)	Extant	
Beaupré	Champagne	Chassey-Beaupré	mid-17th century	Choiseul-Daillecourt (de)	Extinct	
Beaupréau	Anjou	49	1554	Montéspedon (de) + Bourbon-Montpensier (de)	Extinct 1884	
Beauregard	Savoie	74 Chens-sur-Léman	1700	Costa de Beauregard	Extant	
Beauvau* 1 (du Rivau)	Anjou	37 Lémeré	1664	Beauvau(-Craon) (de)	Extinct 1697 (sold); renewed then extinct 1982	
Beauvau 2	Lorraine					
Le Bellay	Anjou	49 Allonnes	Louis XIII	Bellay (du)	Extinct 1661, title raised	
Bellebrune	Picardy	62 Bellebrune	mid-17th century	Blondel de Joigny (de)	Extinct	
Bellebrune	Picardy	62	Louis XIII	Estampes-Valençay (d')	Extinct 1742	
Bellefonds	Normandie	50 La Haye-Bellefonds	Louis XIII	Gigault de Bellefonds	Extinct 1928	
Bellegarde* 1	Orléanais	45 Bellegarde	c. 1692	Pardaillan de Gondrin (de)	Extinct	
Bellegarde 2	Orléanais	45 Bellegarde	1757	Gaultier de Bézigny	Extinct 1776 (sold)	
Bellegarde 3	Orléanais	45 Bellegarde	1776	Gilbert de Voisins		
Belle-Isle 1	Bretagne	56 Belle-Île-en-Mer	1573	Gondi-Retz (de)	Extinct 1658 (vente)	
Belle-Isle 2	Bretagne	56 Belle-Île-en-Mer	1668	Fouquet de Belle-Isle	Extinct à la Révolution	
Bénac	Bigorre	65 Bénac	1636.	Montault-Bénac (de) [ou Montaut]	Extinct 1684	
Bénéhart	Maine	72 Chahaignes	1649	Maillé-Bénéhart (de)	Extinct 1726	
Bénouville	Normandie	14 Bénouville	1752	Gillain de Bénouville	Extinct 1768	
Bercy	Île-de-France	75 Paris, et 94 Charenton	Louis XIV	Malon de Bercy (de)	Extinct	
Bernières*	Normandie	76 Bernières	1678	Maignart de Bernières	Extinct 1734	
Berny	Île-de-France	94 Fresnes et 92 Antony	c. 1653	Lionne (de)	Extinct 1789	
Bersaillin	Franche-Comté	39 Bersaillin	1748	Froissard (de Bersaillin) (de)	Extant	
Bertoult* d'Œufs	Artois	62 Œuf-en-Ternois	1766	Bertoult de Hauteclocque (de)	Extant	
Bérulle*	Champagne	10 Bérulle	1720	Bérulle (de)	Extinct 1950	
Berville	Seine-Maritime	76 Berville	1729	Escors (d')	Extinct	
Beuvron	Normandie	14 Beuvron-en Auge	1593	Harcourt-Beuvron (d')		
Beynac	Périgord	24 Beynac-et-Cazenac	1619	Beynac (de)	Extinct 1753, relevé	
Beynes	Provence	04 Beynes	1673	Castillon (de) then Leydet (de)		
Biards (les)	Normandie	50 Isigny-le-Buat	1690	Pierrepont (de)	Extinct 1833	
Bièvre (-le-Châtel)	Île-de-France	91 Bièvres	1770	Mareschal de Bièvre	Extinct 1789, raised	
Bigny	Berry		c. 1640	Chevenon de Bigny (de)	Extinct 1910	
Biran	Armagnac	32 Biran	1657	Roquelaure (de)	Extinct 1884	
Biron	Périgord	24 Biron	1651	Gontaut-Biron (de)	Extant	
Bizy	Normandie	27 Vernon	1675	Jubert de Bouville	Extinct	
Bizy	Normandie	27 Vernon	1761	Bourbon (de) (House of Penthièvre)	Extinct	
Blain (1)	Bretagne	44 Blain	c. 1548	Rohan-Gié (de)	Extant	
Blain (2)	Bretagne	44 Blain	1660	Rohan-Chabot (de)	Extant	
Blainville	Lorraine	54 Blainville-sur-l'Eau	1729	Lenoncourt (de)	Extinct	
Blainville	Normandie	14 Blainville-sur-Orne	1680	Colbert de Seignelay	Extinct 1875	
Blainville	Normandie	76 Blainville-Crevon	Louis XIV	Tourzel d'Alègre (de)	Extinct	
Le Blaisel	Boulonnais	62	1780	Blaisel (du) (olim Le Canut)	Extant	
Blaisy	Bourgogne	21 Blaisy-Haut	1695	Joly de Blaisy	Extinct	
Le Blanc (1)	Berry	36 Le Blanc	1664	Aloigny de Rochefort (d')	Extinct 1701	
Le Blanc (2)	Berry	36 Le Blanc	1715	Pinsonneau	Extinct	
Blangy	Normandie	14	1864	Le Viconte de Blangy	Extant	
Blanquefort	Guyenne	33 Blanquefort	c. 1670	Durfort-Duras (de)	Extinct 1838	
Blaru	Île-de-France	78 Blaru	1659	Tilly-Blaru (de)	Extinct 1855	
Blérancourt	Picardy	02 Blérancourt	Louis XIII	Potier de Gesvres	Extinct 1839	
Bois-de-La-Motte	Bretagne	22 Trigavou	1621	Bellouan-Avaugour (de) devenu ensuite Avaugour (d')	Extinct 1633	
Le Bois-de-La-Musse or La Muce	Bretagne	44 Chantenay	1651	Blanchard de La Muce	Extinct	
Bois-Dauphin	Maine	72	c. 1640	(Montmorency) Laval-Boisdauphin (de)	Extinct 1835	
Le Bois-Février	Bretagne	35	1674	Langan (de)	Extinct 1795	
Boisgélin	Picardy	02	1819	Boisgélin (de)	Extant	
Boisy	Forez	42	1564	Gouffier de Roannais	Extinct 1802	
Bollwiller	Alsace	68	1739	Rosen (de)	Extinct 1779	
Bonac	Foix	09	1685	Usson de Bonac (d')	Extinct 1821	
Bonas	Armagnac	32	1629	Pardaillan de Séailles (de)	Extinct 1836	
Bonas	Armagnac	32	1773	Mellet (de)	Extinct 1836	Confirmation
Bonnecourt	Champagne	52	1685	Capizuchi de Bologne (de)	Extinct 1794	
Bonneguise	Périgord	24	1762	Bonneguise-Badefols (de)	Extinct 19th century	
Bonneval*	Normandie	27 Condé-sur-Risle	1671	Val de Bonneval (du)	Extinct 1949	
Bonnivet	Poitou	86 Vendeuvre-du-Poitou	c. 1525	Gouffier de Bonnivet	Extinct 1865	
Le Bordage	Bretagne	35 Ercé-près-Liffré	1656	Montbourcher (de)	Extinct 1744	
La Borde (-au-Château) 1	Bourgogne	21 Meursanges	1645	Brulart de La Borde	Sold late 18th century	
La Borde (-au-Château) 2	Bourgogne	21 Meursanges	1785	Laborde (de)	Extinct	
Born	Agenais	47	1724	Belsunce-Castelmoron (de)	en 1796	
Bouc 1	Provence	13 Bouc-Bel-Air	1690	Séguiran (de)	Extinct, transféré	
Bouc 2, alias Bouc-Albertas*	Provence	13 Bouc-Bel-Air	1767	Albertas (d')	Extant	
Le Bouchet-Valgrand (1) or Duquesne	Ile-de-Fce	91 Vert-le-Petit	1682	Duquesne	Extinct 1688	
Le Bouchet-Valgrand (2)	Île-de-France	91 Vert-le-Petit	1720	Le Bas de Montargis	Extinct 1731 avec le titulaire	
Bouclans	Franche-Comté	25	1749	le Bas	Extant	
Bouhier	Bourgogne	21 Lantenay				
Bouillé	Maine	53	c. 1615	Bouillé (de)	Extinct 1836	
La Boulaye 1	Bourgogne	71	1619	Rochefort-Luçay (de)	Extinct 1690	
La Boulaye 2	Bourgogne	71	1696	Gigault de Bellefonds	Extinct	
Bourbonne	Champagne	52	c. 1620	Livron (de)	Extinct 1805	
La Bourdaisière	Touraine	37	1717	Courcillon-Dangeau (de)	Extant	
Bourdeille	Périgord	24 Bourdeilles	18th century	Bertin, relevé par Bourdeille (de)	Extinct 1947	
du Bourdet	Poitou	79	mid 17th-century	Acarie du Bourdet	Extinct	
La Bourdonnaye	Bretagne	56	1717	La Bourdonnaye (de)	Extant	
Bournazel	Rouergue	12	1624	Buisson de Bournazel (de)	Extinct 1864	
Bournezeau	Poitou	85 Bournezeau	1681	Creil (de)	Extinct 1761	
Boury (1)	Île-de-France	60 Boury-en-Vexin	1652	Pellevé (de)	Extinct 1672	
Boury (2)	Île-de-France	60 Boury-en-Vexin	1686	Aubourg de Boury	Extant	
Bouteville	Angoumois	16 Bouteville	Louis XIII	Béon de Luxembourg (de)	Extinct 1883	
Boutières	Dauphiné	38 Le Touvet	1676	Émé de Guiffrey de Monteynard (de Marcieu)	Extinct 2004	
Bouville	Normandie	76 Bouville	1698	Jubert de Bouville	Extinct 1793	
Bouzols	Velay	43 Arsac	c. 1630	Montagut de Beaune (de)	Extinct 1834	
Boves	Picardy	80 Boves	1630	Moy-Riberpré (de)	Extinct 1681	
Boynes	Orléanais	45 Boynes	1867	Bourgeois de Boynes	Extant	
Bozas	Vivarais	07 Bozas	1693	Bourg de Bozas (du)	Extant	
Branges	Bourgogne	71 Branges	1655	Barillon d'Amoncourt (de)	Extinct 1890	
Brantes	Comtat	84 Brantes	1674	Laurents (des)	Extinct 1848	
Brazeux ((ou Braseux)	Île-de-France	91 Vert-le-Grand	Louis XIII	Gouffier d'Heilly	Extinct	
Brécey	Normandie	50 Brecey	c. 1775	de Vassy	Extinct 1856	
Brégançon	Provence	83 Bormes-les-Mimosas	1574	Escalin des Aimars	Extinct	
Breille	Comté de Nice	06 Breil-sur-Roya	1700	Solar de Gouvon	Extinct	
Bressieux	Dauphiné	38 Bressieux	1612	Grolée de Mevouillon (de)	Extinct	
La Bretesche	Bretagne or Poitou	44 Maisdon	1657	Jousseaume de La Bretesche	Extant	
du Breuil	Bourgogne	71 Gueugnon	1670	Chargères du Breuil (de)	Extinct 1760	
Bréval	Île-de-France	78 Bréval	1623	Harlay de Champvallon (de)	Extinct ca 1693	
Bressuire	Poitou	Vendée	Henry II	Vergier La Rochejacquelein (de)		
Brézé	Anjou	49 Brézé	1615	Maillé-Brézé (de)	Extinct 1646	
Brézé	Anjou	49 Brézé	1685	Dreux-Brézé (de)	Extant	
Brézolles	Perche	28 Brézolles	1660	Broglie (de)	Extinct 1824	
Bridoré	Touraine	37 Bridoré	1651	Boursault (de)	Extinct 1791	
Brie	Bretagne	35 Brie	1660	Loisel or Loaisel (de)	Extinct 1670	
Brinon* 1	Guadeloupe	971 Capesterre-Belle-Eau	1738	Senneterre (de)	Sold 1754	
Brinon 2	Guadeloupe	971 Capesterre-Belle-Eau	1755	Pinel Dumanoir	Extinct 1793	
Brinvilliers or Brunvillers 1 (then La Mothe)	Picardy	60 Sains-Morainvilliers	1660	Gobelin-l'Escalopier	Extinct 1677 (sold), renewed	
Brion	Gévaudan	48 Brion	1756	Michel du Roc de Brion (de)	Extant	
Broc	Anjou	49	1758	Broc (de)	Extinct 1916	
Broissia	Franche-Comté	39 Broissia	1697	Froissard de Broissia	Extant	
Brou	Île-de-France	77 Brou-sur-Chantereine	1761	Feydeau	Extinct 1882	
Les Brosses	Poitou	16	c. 1740	Assier des Brosses (d')	Extinct 1914	
Brue	Provence	83 Brue-Auriac	1750	Roux (dit de Corse)	Extinct 1792	
Brunoy	Île-de-France	91 Brunoy	1737	Paris de Montmartel	Extinct (Sold 1774, Duché-pairie en 1775)	
Bruyères-le-Châtel 1	Île-de-France	91 Bruyères-le-Châtel	1676	Lespinette Le Meirat	Extinct 1713	
Bruyères-le-Châtel 2	Île-de-France	91 Bruyères-le-Châtel	1731	Lespinette Le Meirat	Extinct (sold 1785)	
Buchepot	Berry	36	1863; 1865	Buchepot (de)	Extinct 1940	
La Buissière	Artois	62 Labuissière	1663	Maulde (de)	Extinct 1844	
La Bussière	Orléanais	45 La Bussière	1679	Tillet (du)	Extinct 19th century	
Bussy-le-Château	Champagne	51 Bussy-le-Château	1699; confirmed 1703	Arnolet de Lochefontaine (d')	Extinct 1706	
Buzancy	Champagne	08 Buzancy	1658	Anglure (d')	Extinct 1756 (sold)	
Cabannes	Provence	13 Cabannes	1680	Rollands (des)	Extinct	
Cabris	Provence	06 Cabris	c. 1750	Clapiers-Cabris (de)	Extinct 1813	
Cagnes	Provence	06 Cagnes-sur-Mer	1677	Grimaldi de Cagnes	Extinct 1895	
Cailly	Normandie	76 Cailly	1661	Lefèvre de Caumartin	Extinct 1706	
La Calmette	Languedoc	30 La Calmette	1764	Mathéï (ou Mathieu) de la Calmette		
Calonges, also called Bougy	Guyenne	47 Calonges	1667	Le Révérend de Bougy	Extinct 1744	
Calvisson	Languedoc	30 Calvisson	1644	Louet de Nogaret (de)		
Campet	Gascogne	40 Campet-et-Lamolère	1731	Lyon de Campet (du)	Extinct 1914	
Candau	Béarn	64 Castétis	1718	Nays (de)	Extinct 1913	
Candolle	Provence	13	1866	Candolle (de)	Extant	
Canillac	Gévaudan	48 Canilhac	1400	Rogier de Beaufort	Extinct 1725	
Canisy	Normandie	50	1619	de Carbonnel de Canisy	Transfer via donation 1715; Extinct 1997	
Canisy	Normandie	50	1619	de Faudoas	Extinct 1784	
Cannet (du)	Provence	83	1746	de Rascas	Extant	
Cany-Barville	Normandie	76	1648	Le Marinier	Extinct 1878	
Caradeuc	Bretagne	22	1779	de Caradeuc de La Chalotais	Extinct 1859	
Cardaillac	Quercy	46	1645	de Cardaillac	Extinct 1742	
Carency	Artois	62	1665	Toustain de Frontebosc	Extinct	
Cargèse	Corse	20A				
Carman or Kerman	Bretagne	29 Kernilis	1612	Maillé de L'Islette (de)	Extinct 1786/89	
Carmaux	Albigeois	81	1731	de Solages	Extinct	
Carmaux	Albigeois	81	1763	de Solages	Extinct	
Cassagne-Miramon	Auvergne	15	1768	de Cassagne de Beaufort de Miramon	Extant	
Castellane	Provence	04	16	de Castellane-Novejean	Extinct	
Castellet	Provence	04 Castellet-lès-Sausses	1752	Gueidan (de)		
Castelmoron	Agenais	47	c. 1620	de Caumont-La Force	Extinct	
Castelnau	Berry	18	1652	de Castelnau-Jonville	Extinct 1835	
Castelnau-d'Estretefonds	Languedoc	31	c. 1537	de Vabres	Extinct	
Castelnau-Laloubère	Bigorre	65	1666	de Castelnau	Extinct	
Castelviel	Bigorre	65	1724	d'Aignan	Extinct 1802	
Castilly	Normandie	14	1683	de Boran	Extinct	
Castries	Languedoc	34	1645	de La Croix de Castries		
Caulaincourt	Picardy	02	1714	de Caulaincourt	Extinct 1896	
Caumont	Agenais	47	Louis XIV	de Caumont-La Force	Extant	
Caumont	Comtat Venaissin	84	c. 1722	de Seytres de Caumont	Duchy in 1789	Papal title
Causans	Dauphiné	84	1667; confirmed 1679	de Vincens de Causans	Extant	
Caylus	Quercy	82	Louis XV	de Tubières	Duchy 1783	
Cazaux			1862	de Cazaux	Extant	
Cépoy	Orléanais	45	1748	Bouvier de La Motte	Extinct 1918	
Céreste	Provence	04 Céreste	1674	Brancas-Céreste (de)	Duchy 1785; Extinct 1802	
Cessac	Quercy	46	Louis XIV	Bérail de Cazillac	Extinct	
Chabanais	Angoumois	16	1715	Colbert de Saint-Pouange	Extant	
Chabannes			1817	de Chabannes	Extant	
Chabrillan	Dauphiné	26	1674	de Guigues de Moreton	Extinct 1950	
Chabris	Berry	36	c. 1620	de Béthune-Chabris	Extinct 1833	
Chaillot	Franche-Comté	70	1746	de Chaillot		
Chaillou	Touraine	36	1782	Amelot de Chaillou	Extinct 1911	
Chalabre	Languedoc	11 Chalabre	c. 1745	de Bruyères-Chalabre	Extinct 1838	
Chalençon	Velay	43	1614	de (Chalencon-)Polignac	Extant	
Challes	Savoie	73	1669	Milliet de Challes	Extinct	
Chalusset	Limousin	87	1644	Bonnin de Chalusset	To the crown of France, 1824	
Chamberet	Limousin	19	1600	de Pierrebuffière	Extinct 1820	
Chambonas	Vivarais	07	1683	de La Garde de Chambonas	Extinct 1927	
Chambray	Normandie	27	Louis XIV	de Chambray	Extinct 1948	
La Chambre	Savoie	73	1562	de Seyssel-La Chambre	Extinct 20th century	
Champcenetz 1, or La Salle*	Ile-de-France	77 Champcenest	1673	Caillebot	Sold 1685	
Champcenetz 2	Île-de-France	77 Champcenest	1686	Quentin de La Vienne	Extinct 1849	
Champlay	Champagne	89 Champlay	c. 1690	Bollé	Extinct 1844	
Champvallon	Champagne	89	c. 1670	Harlay (de)	Extinct	
Chantôme	Orléanais	45 Binas	1696	Terrat	Extinct	
La Chapelle-la-Reine	Île-de-France	77	1680	Argouges (d')	Extinct 1815	
Chappes	Champagne	10	Louis XIV	Aumont-Villequier (d')	Extinct 20th century	
La Charce	Dauphiné	26	1638	La Tour du Pin de La Charce (de)	Extant	
Charette	Bretagne	44	1775	de Charette de La Gascherie	Extinct 1792	
Charmont	Champagne	10	1723	Hennequin	Extinct	
Charras	Angoumois	16	Louis XV	de La Laurencie-Charras	Extinct 1857	
La Charte-sur-le-Loir	Maine	72	1697	de Courtoux	Extinct	
Chassingrimont	Berry	36	Mid 17th century	d'Aubusson-Chassingrimont	Extinct	
Le Chastel	Bretagne	22	1714	Crozat du Chastel	Extinct 1789	
Le Chasteler	Hainaut	59	1725; confirmed 1769	du Chasteler	Extinct 1908	
Châteaufrémont	Bretagne	44 Saint-Herblon	1683	Cornulier (de)	Extinct	
Château-Gontier	Anjou	53 Château-Gontier	1656	Bailleul (de)	Extinct 1831	
Château-l'Arc	Provence	13	1687	Boutassy (de)	Extinct	
Châteaumorand	Forez	42 St-Martin d'Estreaux	1625	de Lévis-Châteaumorand	Extant	
Châteauneuf (1)	Bretagne	35 Châteauneuf d'Ille-et-Vilaine	1702	Beringhen (de)	Extinct; renewed	
Châteauneuf (2) or La Vieuville*	Bretagne	35 Châteauneuf d'Ille-et-Vilaine	1746	Baude de La Vieuville		
Châteauneuf-la-Forêt	Limousin	87	1615	Pierrebuffière (de)	Extinct 1820	
Châteauneuf (le-Charbonnier)	Provence	04 Châteauneuf-Val-Saint-Donnat	1727	Meyronnet-Châteauneuf (de)	Extinct 1913	
Châteauneuf-le-Rouge	Provence	13	1723	Gautier de Gironton (de)	Extinct	
Châteauneuf (sur-Cher)	Berry	18 Châteauneuf-sur-Cher	c. 1630	L'Aubespine-Châteauneuf (de)	Extinct	
Châteauneuf (sur-Cher)	Berry	18 Châteauneuf-sur-Cher	1681	Colbert	Extinct 1715 (sold)	
Châteauneuf (sur-Cher)	Berry	18 Châteauneuf-sur-Cher	1715	Phélypeaux de Pontchartrain	Extinct 1739 (sold)	
Châteauneuf (sur-Loire)	Orléanais	45 Châteauneuf-sur-Loire	1671	Phélypeaux de La Vrillière	Extant	
Châteauneuf (sur-Sarthe)	Anjou	49	1750	Amelot de Chaillou	Extinct 1832	
Château-Renard	Provence	13	Louis XIV	Aimar d'Albi	Extinct 1849	
Château-Renaud	Bourgogne	71	1752	de Mailly de Châteaurenaud	Extinct 1819	
Châteaurenault	Touraine	37	1620; confirmed 1704	de Rousselet	Extinct 1793	
Châteaurenault	Touraine	37	1752	d'Estaing de Saillans	Extinct 1793	
Châteauroux	Berry	36	1616	de Bourbon-Condé	Duchy 1627; Extinct 1830	
Châteauvieux	Savoie	74	1785	Lullin de Châteauvieux	Extinct 1850	
Châtelet	Bretagne	35	1682	Hay du Châtelet	Extinct 1985	
Châtelet	Lorraine	88	c. 1625	du Châtelet-Thon	Extinct 1796	
Le Châtellier (-le-Fort)	Touraine	37	1640	de Pierrebuffière	Extinct	
Châtenois	Franche-Comté	70	1705	de Saint-Mauris de Châtenois	Extinct 1910	
Chaulnes	Dauphiné	38	1684	de Chaulnes	Extinct	
Chaumont	Savoie	74	1681	Deschamps	Extinct 20th century	
Chaussin	Bourgogne	39	1573	de Lorraine-Mercœur	Barony 1602	
Chaussin	Bourgogne	39	1692	de Bourbon-Condé	Extinct	
Chaussin	Bourgogne	39	1724	de Bourbon-Condé	Extinct	
Chaussin	Bourgogne	39	1766	de Poly	Extinct	
Chavagnac	Auvergne	15	Lettres patentes 1720	de Chavagnac	Extant	
Chef-Boutonne	Poitou	79	1713	Phélypeaux de Pontchartrain	Extinct 1794	
Chef-Boutonne	Poitou	79	1742	Roujault	Extinct 1794	
Chérisey	Lorraine	57	c. 1720	de Chérisey	Extant	
La Chesnelaye then de Romilley	Bretagne	35	1641	de Romilley	Extinct 1767	
Chevrières	Dauphiné	38	1682	de la Croix de Chevrières	Extinct 1903	
Chignin	Savoie	73		Métral de Châtillon	Extinct 1794	
Chilly-Mazarin	Île-de-France	91	1624	Coëffier d'Effiat	Extinct 1949	
Choisinet	Gévaudan	48	1650	de La Tour de Bains-Saint-Vidal	Extinct	
Choisy (-aux-Loges)	Orléanais	45 Bellegarde (du Loiret)	1599	de l'Hôpital-Choisy	Duchy 1646	
Cholet (1)	Anjou	49 Cholet	1677	de Broons	Extinct	
Cholet (2)	Anjou	49 Cholet	After 1703	Colbert de Maulévrier	Extinct 1839	
Cingé	Touraine	37	c. 1670	de Crevant-Cingé	Extinct 1826	
Cinq-Mars	Touraine	37 Cinq-Mars-la-Pile	c. 1638	Coëffier de Ruzé d'Effiat	Extinct	
Cipières	Nice	06		Bouthilier-Chavigny		
Circé	Poitou	79	1663	Foucher de Circé	Extinct 1917	
Cirey-sur-Blaise	Champagne	52	mid 16th century	du Châtelet	Duchy 1777	
Civrac	Guyenne	33	1647	de Durfort-Civrac	Extinct 1884	
Claveyson	Dauphiné	26 Claveyson	1658	Lionne or Lyonne (de)	Extinct 1675	
Clères et Panilleuse	Normandie	76 Clères	1651	Presteval (de)	Extinct 1793	
Clermont-d'Entragues	Agenais	47 Clermont-Soubiran	1617	Balsac d'Entragues (de)	Extinct	
Clermont-Tonnerre	Orléannais	41	1829	Clermont-Tonnerre (de)	Extant	
Clervaux	Poitou	86	1620	d'Aumont-Villequier	Extinct	
Cluses	Savoie	74	1700	Martin du Fresnoy	Extinct 1824	
Codolet	Languedoc	30	1622	d'Ancezune-Cadart	Transfer 1767; Extinct 1865.	
Coetanfao	Bretagne	56	c. 1710	de Kerhoent-Coëtanfao	Extinct 19th century	
Coëtlogon	Bretagne	22 Coëtlogon	1622	Coëtlogon (de)	Extinct 1742	
Coëtmeur	Bretagne	29	1593	de Tournemine	Extinct	
Coëtquen	Bretagne	22	1575	Coëtquen (de)	Extinct 1838	
Cœuvres	Picardy	02 Cœuvres-et-Valsery	1585	Estrées (d')	Extinct 1888	
Coislin	Bretagne	44	1634; confirmed 1656	du Cambout de Coislin	Extinct 1887	
Colembert	Artois	62 Colembert	1691	Maulde (de)		
Coligny	Franche-Comté	39	1617	de Coligny	Extinct	
Colombières 1 or Colombiers	Touraine	37 Villandry	1619	Le Breton de Villandry	Extinct	
Combray	Calvados	14	1814	in personal favor of the marquise de Combray		
Combronde	Auvergne	63	1564; confirmed 1637	du Puy-du-Fou	Extinct 1797	
Combronde	Auvergne	63	Louis XIV	Amelot	Extinct 1720	
Conflans	Savoie	73	1621	de Watteville de Joux	Extinct	
Cons-la-Grandville	Lorraine	54	1719	de Lambertye	Extant	
Conty	Picardy	80	1557	de Bourbon-Condé	Extinct 1839	
Coppala	Comtat Venaissin	84	1755	de Gaudemaris	Extant	Papal title
Corbeau*-de-Vaulserre	Dauphiné	38 Saint-Albin-de-Vailserre	1751	de Corbeau de Vaulserre	Extinct 1976	
La Coste	Bretagne	22	17th century	du Gouray	Extinct 1831	
La Coste	Bretagne	22	1720	Andrault de Langeron	Extinct 1831	
Coublans	Champagne	52 Chassigny-Aisey	1547	d'Anglure	Extinct	
Coucy	Picardy	02	1672	d'Orléans	Extant	
Coudrée	Savoie	74	1655	Maison d'Allinges	Extinct 1843	
Couhé-Vérac	Poitou	86 Couhé	1652	de Saint-Georges de Vérac	Extinct 1858	
Coupigny	Normandie	27	Henry IV	du Quesnel de Coupigny	Extinct	
Courbons (1)	Provence	04	1646	Grimaldi de Cagnes	Extinct	
Courbons (2)	Provence	04	1677	de Brancas-Rochefort	Extinct 1717	
Courbons (3)	Provence	04	1717	de Roux de Gaubert	Extinct 1850	
Courcelles	Maine	72	1667	de Champlais	Extinct 1898	
Courcy-aux-Loges	Orléanais	45	1681	de Bullion-Courcy	Extant	
Courcy-aux-Loges	Orléanais	45	1749	Roussel de Courcy	Extant	
Couronnel						
Courseulles	Champagne	89	1660	de Courseulles du Han	Extinct	
Courtanvaux (1)	Maine	72 Bessé-sur-Braye	1609	Souvré (de)	Extinct 1656	
Courtanvaux (2)	Maine	72	1662	Le Tellier de Louvois	Extinct 1781	
Courtebourne	Artois	62	1671	de Calonne de Courtebourne	Extinct 1887	
Courtivron	Bourgogne	21	1698	Le Compasseur-Créqui-Montfort de Courtivron	Extant	
Courtomer	Normandie	61	1620	Simon devenue de Saint-Simon	Extinct 1816	
Courville	Chartrain	28	1656	de Béthune-Sully	Extinct	
Couturelle	Artois	62	1759	Boudart de Couturelle	Extinct 1840	
Coux	Limousin		1866	de Coux	Extant	
Coye						
Cramayel	Île-de-France	77	1722	Fontaine de Cramayel	Extinct 1982	
Craon	Lorraine	54	1712	de Beauvau-Craon	Eteint 1982	
Craon	Lorraine	54	1768	de Beauvau-Craon	Extinct 1982	
Crénan	Bretagne	22	1685	de Perrien de Crénan	Extinct 1836	
Créquy	Picardy	62	Louis XIV	de Blanchefort-Créquy	Extinct 1794	
Crèvecœur	Picardy	60	1650	Gouffier de Bonnivet	Extinct	
Crillon	Comtat	84	End of 17th century	de Berton de Balbes	Extinct	Duchy 1725
Croismare	Lorraine	54	1767	de Croismare	Extinct 1842	
Croissy	Île-de-France	77	1676	Colbert de Torcy	Extinct after 1787	
Croix	Artois	62	1691	de Croix	Extant	
Cruzy(-le-Châtel)	Bourgogne	89	1620	de Clermont-Tonnerre	Extinct 1844	
Cucé	Bretagne	35	1643	de Bourgneuf	Extinct 1794	
Cugnac	Périgord		1861	Cugnac (de)	Extant	
Curton	Guyenne	33	1563	de Chabannes-Curton	Extant	
Custines	Lorraine	54	1563	de Custine	Extinct	
Dammartin	Champagne	52 Dammartin	1719	Rose (de)	Extinct 1846	
Dampierre	Champagne	10 Dampierre (-de-l'Aube)	1645	Picot de Dampierre	Extinct 1871	
Dampierre (-en-Burly)	Orléanais	45 Dampierre-en-Burly	1616	Cugnac de Dampierre (de)	Extinct 1628	
Dampierre (-le-Vieil)	Champagne	51 Le-Vieil-Dampierre	1649	l'Aubespine (de)	Extinct	
Dangeau	Chartrain	28	1665	de Courcillon-Dangeau	Extinct 1802	
Dadvisard			1863	Dadvisard	Extant	
Les Défends	Poitou	86 Dissay	1585	Gouffier de Bonnivet	Extinct	
Destilly	Touraine	37	1667	de Valory de Destilly	Extinct 1898	
Dinteville (1)	Champagne	52	c. 1635	de Bussy-Brion	Extinct	
Dinteville (2)	Champagne	52	1647	le Goux de la Berchère	Extinct	
Dinteville (3)	Champagne	52	1703	le Brun de Dinteville	Extinct 1828	
Dion-Malfiance	Artois	62 Reclinghem	1787	Dion de Wandonne (de)	Extinct 1826	
Dolomieu	Dauphiné	38 Dolomieu	1688 or 1701	Gratet de Dolomieu (de)	Extinct 1843	
Dormans	Champagne	51	1671	Broglie (de)	Extinct 1830	
La Douze	Périgord	24	1615	Abzac de La Douze (d')	Extinct 1698	
Drée*	Bourgogne	71 Curbigny	1767	Drée (de)	Extinct	
Dreux-Brézé	Anjou	49	1685	Dreux-Brézé (de)	Extant	
Dromesnil	Picardy	80	1676	Hallencourt-Dromesnil (d')	Extinct 1749	
Dunes	Agenais	82	1713	La Chabanne (de)	Extinct 1907	
Duquesne	Ile-de-Fce	91 Vert-le-Petit	1682			
Duras	Agenais	47 Duras	1609	de Durfort-Duras	Extinct	
Duras-Chastellux	Guyenne	47 Duras	1819	de Chastellux	Extant	
Echauffour	Normandie	61 Echauffour	1648	Erard-le Gris	Extinct	
Ecquevilly	Normandie		c. 1680	Hennequin d'Ecquevilly	Extinct	
Ecquevilly*	Île-de-France	78 Ecquevilly	1724	Hennequin d'Ecquevilly	Extinct 1870	
Effiat	Auvergne	63 Effiat	1627	Coëffier de Ruzé	Extinct 1719	
Elbeuf	Normandie	76 Elbeuf	1554	Lorraine-Elbeuf (de)	Duchy 1581	
Élincourt	Picardy	60 Élincourt-Sainte-Marguerite	1750	Bellinglise (de)		
Emalleville	Normandie	76 Saint-Sauveur d'Émalleville	1725	Esmalleville (d')		
Ennery (or Esnery)	Ile-de-France	95 Ennery	1763	Charpentier d'Ennery		
Entrecasteaux (1)	Provence	83 Entrecasteaux	1676	Adhémar de Monteil de Grignan (branch of Castellane)	Extinct 1714	
Entrecasteaux (2)	Provence	83 Entrecasteaux	1714	Bruny d'Entrecasteaux (de)	Extinct 1793	
Entrevon*	Comtat Venaissin	84 Villedieu	1782	Gentil		
Épinay	Bretagne	35 Champeaux				
Époisses	Bourgogne	21 Époisses	1613	Ancienville (d')	Extinct	
Equirre or Esquire	Artois	62 Équirre	1712	Partz de Pressy (de)	Extinct 1974	
Esclignac	Armagnac	32 Monfort	Early 18th century	Preissac d'Esclignac (de)	Extinct 1873; duchy 1787	
Escorailles*	Bourgogne	71 Bouhans	1710	Escorailles (d')		
Espagny	Picardy	80 Chaussoy-Epagny	Mid 17th century	Gouffier d'Espagny	Extinct 20th century	
Esparron	Dauphiné	26 Rochebrune	1651	Simiane-Esparron (de)	Extinct 1805	
Esparron	Provence	04 Esparron de Verdon	1703	Castellane-Esparron (de)	Extant	
Espinay	Bretagne	35 Champeaux	1575	Espinay (d')	Extinct 1633	
Espinouse	Provence	04 Le Chaffaut-Saint-Jurson	1651	Coriolis d'Espinouse (de)	Extinct 1977	
Esquirre	Artois	62 Équirre				
Les Essarts-Avrilly	Normandie	27 Les Essarts	1723	Lombelon des Essarts		
Esserteaux	Picardy	80 Essertaux	1764	Bery (de)	Extinct	
Esternay 1	Champagne	51 Esternay	1653	Larcher	Sold 1655	
Esternay 2	Champagne	51 Esternay	1720	Fabert x Grimoard de Caylus	Extinct 1765	
Estiau, alias Étiau	Anjou	49 St Philbert-du-Peuple	1620	Estampes-Valençay (d')	Extinct 1742	
Estiau	Anjou	49 St Philbert-du-Peuple	1702	Croiset d'Estiau	Extinct 1916	
Estissac	Périgord	24 Saint-Hilaire d'Estissac	Mid 17th century	Roye de la Rochefoucauld (de)		
Estoublon	Provence	04 Estoublon	1664	Grille d'Estoublon (de)	Extinct 1924	
Euzénou	Bretagne	29 Leuhan	1775	Euzénou (d')		
Éverly	Champagne	77 Everly	1626	La Vallée-Fossez (de)	Extinct 1875	
Évry-les-Châteaux	Île-de-France	77 Évry-Grégy	1724	Brunet d'Évry	Extant	
Excideuil	Périgord	24 Excideuil	1613	Talleyrand-Périgord	Extinct 1968	
Fabert*	Bourgogne	21 Larrey	1650	Fabert (de)	Extinct 1669; (see Larrey)	
Falletans*	Franche-Comté	70 Thiéffrans	1712	Falletans (de)	Extinct 1848	
Famechon	Artois	62 Famechon	1769	Venant (de)		
La Fare	Languedoc	30 Saint-André-de-Valborgne	1646	la Fare-Monclar (de)	Extinct 1721	
La Fare*	Languedoc	30 Vénéjan	1754 (or 1757)	la Fare-Vénéjan (de)	Extant	
La Fare-les-Oliviers 1	Provence	13 La Fare-les-Oliviers	1768	Roux de Bonneval (de)	Confirmed 1787	
La Fare (-les-Oliviers) 2	Provence	13 La Fare-les-Oliviers	1787	de Roux de Bonneval	Extinct 1830; Extant in Belgium	
Faudoas	Languedoc	82	1650	de Rochechouart-Barbazan d'Astarac	Extinct 1791	
Faulquemont	Lorraine	57	1629	de Haraucourt	Extinct 1793	
Faverges	Savoie	74	1644	Milliet de Faverges	Extant	
La Fayette	Auvergne	63	c. 1690	du Motier de la Fayette	Extinct 1890	
Faÿ-lès-Nemours	Île-de-France	77 Faÿ-lès-Nemours	1651	Rougé (de)	Extinct 1732; renewed by a cadet branch (courtesy)	
Fayolle	Périgord	24 Fayolle	1724	Fayolle (de)	Extinct 2012	
Ferrières-en-Brie 1	Île-de-France	77 Ferrières-en-Brie	1600	Marillac (de)		
Ferrières-en-Brie 2	Île-de-France	77 Ferrières-en-Brie	1692	Labriffe (de)	Extant	
Ferrières-en-Brie 3	Île-de-France	77 Ferrières-en-Brie	1721	Luettin		
Ferrières-le-Maistre	Picardy	80 Ferrières	1665	Le Maistre de Ferrières	Extinct 1820	
La Ferté-Beauharnais*	Orléanais	41 La Ferté-Beauharnais	1764	Beauharnais (de)	Extinct 1974	
La Ferté-Imbault	Blésois, Berry	41 La Ferté-Imbault	c. 1620, alias 1651	House of Estampes, alias d'Étampes	Extinct 1748, raised by not used (title extant of marquis d'Estampes, not extinct 1828).	
La Ferté-Senneterre*	Orléanais	45 La Ferté-Saint-Aubin	1616 or 1651	Saint-Nectaire (de)	Extinct 1748; the family 1829	
Fervaques	Normandie	14 Fervaques	Louis XIV	Bullion (de)	Extinct 1871	
Feuquières	Île-de-France	60 Feuquières or 80 Harbonnières	1646	Pas de Feuquières (de)	Extinct 1730	
Fiennes	Picardy	62	1643	Estampes-Valencay (d')	Extinct 1742	
Fiennes* (1 and 2)	Flandres	59 Anstaing	1693; 1776	Fiennes (de); Matharel (de)		
Fimarcon	Guyenne	32 Lagarde-Fimarcon	1503	de Lomagne-Fimarcon	Extinct 1873	
Flamanville	Normandie	50 Flamanville	1654	Bazan de Flamanville	Extinct 1820	
Flamarens	Armagnac	32 Flamarens	c. 1650	Grossolles-Flamarens (de)	Extinct 1879	
Flassan	Provence	84 Flassan	1692	Guibert de Vaubonne	Extinct	
Flavacourt	Île-de-France	60 Flavacourt	1637	Fouilleuse (de)	Extinct 1947	
Flayosc	Provence	83 Flayosc	1678	de Périer de Flayosc	Extinct	
Flers	Normandie	61	1862	Ango de La Motte-Ango de Flers, branch of Villebadin.	Extinct 1909	
La Flocellière	Poitou	85	1616	Maillé-Brézé (de)	Extinct	
La Flocellière	Poitou	85	1697	Granges de Puyguyon (de)	Extinct	
La Flocellière	Poitou	85	1715	Granges de Surgères (de)	Extinct 1795	
Floressas	Quercy	46	1704	de Brachet-Peyrusse de Floressas	Extinct 1924	
Folembray	Picardy	02		de Bourbon (branch of Condé)	Extinct	
Folembray	Picardy	02	1672 (Note: According to Saint-Simon.)	d'Orléans	Extant	
Folin	Nivernais	58	1717; registered 1718	de Folin	Extant	
Fontenay	Normandie	50	1673	Le Berceur de Fontenay	Extinct 18th century	
Fontenay-Mareuil	Île-de-France	95	1623	du Val de Fontenay-Mareuil	Extinct 1794	
Fontenilles	Languedoc	31 Fontenilles	1654 or 1658	La Roche-Fontenilles (de)	Extinct 1777 (elder), or 1930	
Forcalqueiret	Provence	83	1743	Villeneuve (de)	Extinct 1759	
La Force	Périgord	24	1609	Nompar de Caumont-Castelnau	Extant 1637	
Foresta	Provence	13	1651	de Foresta	Extinct 1818	
Foresta	Provence	13	1821	de Foresta	Extant	
Fors (1)	Poitou	79	1639	Poussard du Vigean	Extinct	
Fors (2)	Poitou	79	1693	Maboul de Fors	Extinct 1794	
Fos	Provence	13	1140	de (Marseille-)Fos	Extinct	
Fosseuse	Île-de-France	60	1772	Thomé	Extinct	
Fosseuse	Île-de-France	60	c. 1670	de Montmorency-Fosseux	Extinct	
Fourilles (1)	Bourbonnais	03 Fourilles	1610	Chaumejean (de)	Extinct 1647 (sold le 31 août)	
Fourilles (2)	Bourbonnais	03 Fourilles	1648	Le Lièvre de la Grange	Extinct 1904	
Fourilles (3)	Poitou	86 St-Gervais-les-Trois-Clochers	1662	Chaumejean de Fourilles (de)	Extinct 1734	
Fourilles (4)			1825 and 1830	Le Lièvre de la Grange		
Fourquevaux	Languedoc	31	1687	Beccarie de Pavie	Extinct 1841	
Fox (ou Fos)	Provence	83 Fox-Amphoux	1719	d'Albert du Chaîne	Extinct	
Francières	Champagne	52	1630	de Choiseul-Francières	Extinct	
Franclieu	Bigorre	65	1767	Pasquier de Franclieu	Extinct 1839	
Franconville (1)	Île-de-France	95 Saint-Martin-du-Tertre	1619	O (d')	Extinct 1621	
Franconville (2)	Île-de-France	95 Saint-Martin-du-Tertre	1699	O (d')	Extinct 1734	
Franconville (3) or Théllusson*	Île-de-France	95 Saint-Martin-du-Tertre	1784	Théllusson (de)	Sold 1788	
Fresnoy*	Île-de-France	60 Fresnoy-en-Thelle	1652	Fresnoy (de)	Eteint	
Frolois*, or Ludre-Frolois	Lorraine	54 Frolois	1757	Ludre-Frolois (de)	Extinct 20th century	
Fromenteau	Bretagne	44 Vallet	1760	Barrin de Fromenteau	Extinct 1841	
Frondeville	Normandie	27 Frondeville	1784	Lambert de Frondeville	Extant	
Fronsac	Guyenne	33 Fronsac	1555	Lustrac (de), and Albon de Saint-André (d')	Extinct 1562	
Frontenay or Montrichard*	Franche-Comté	39 Frontenay	1744	Montrichard (de)	1768	
La Galaisière	Perche	28 Souancé-au-Perche	1669	Ryants (de)	Extinct	
La Galaisière	Perche	28 Souancé-au-Parche	1776	Aligre (d')	Extinct 1847	
La Galaisière	Perche	61 Condé-sur-Huisne	1734	Chaumont (de)	Extinct	
La Galissonière 1	Bretagne	44 Monnières, and 44 Le Pallet	1658	Barrin de La Galissonnière	Extinct; renewed	
La Galissonière* 2	Bretagne	44 Vallet	1700	Barrin de La Galissonnière	Extinct 1805	
La Galissonière* 3	Anjou	72 Avoise	1723	Barrin de La Galissonnière	Extinct 1828	
La Galissonière	Bretagne	44 Vallet	1760	Barrin de Fromenteau		
Gallardon	Chartrain	28 Gallardon	1655	Bullion (de)	Extinct 18th century	
Gallerande	Maine	72 Luché-Pringé	1576	Clermont-Gallerande (de)	Extinct 1828	
Gallerande	Maine	72 Luché-Pringé	1719	Clermont-Gallerande (de)	Extinct 1828	
Gamaches	Picardy	80 Gamaches	1620	Rouhault or Rouault de Gamaches	Extinct 1819	
Gambais 1	Île-de-France	78 Gambais	1691	Nyert (de)	Extinct 1765	
Gambais 2	Île-de-France	78 Gambais	1776	Laverdy (de)	Extinct 1793	
Gandelu	Picardy	02 Gandelu	c. 1626	Potier de Gesvres	Extinct 1794	
La Garde-Adhémar	Dauphiné	26 La Garde-Adhémar	1646	Escalin des Aymards	Extinct 1713	
Gassion*	Béarn	64 Camou-Mixe	1660	Gassion (de)	Extinct 1741	
Gaudiès	Languedoc	11 Gaudiès	1596	Lévis d'Audou (de)	Extinct 1870	
Gavaudun	Agenais	47 Gavaudun	1670	Auray de Brie (d')	Extinct 1796	
Genlis	Picardy	02 Villequier-Aumont	1645	Brulart de Genlis	Extinct 1772	
Gerbéviller 1	Lorraine	54 Gerbéviller	1621	Tornielle (de)	Extinct 1737; renewed	
Gerbéviller 2	Lorraine	54 Gerbéviller	1725	Lambertye-Tornielle (de)	Extinct 1940	
Germigney	Fr-Comté	39 Germigney	1740	Germigney (de)		
Germigny	Bourbonnais	18 Germigny-l'Exempt	1708	Frézeau de La Frézelière	Extinct	
La Gervaisais	Bretagne	29 Le Faou	1765	Magon de La Gervaisais	Extinct 1884	
Gesvres	Maine	53 Gesvres	1626	Potier de Gesvres	Extinct 1793	
Gex	Bugey	01 Gex	1515	Savoie (de)	Extinct 1789	
Givry	Bourgogne	71 Givry or 58 Vandenesse	1663 or 1653	Bois de Fiennes (du)	Extinct 1742	
Givry (1)	Champagne	51 Givry-en-Argonne	1653	Courtin	sold 1704	
Gordes	Provence	84 Gordes	1615	Simiane (de)	Extinct 1738	
Goulaine	Bretagne	44 Haute-Goulaine	1621	Goulaine (de)	Extinct 1666	
Gouvion-Saint-Cyr		Sans majorat	1817; 1819	Gouvion-Saint-Cyr (de)	Extant	
Grenédan	Bretagne	22 Illifaut	1747 or 1744	Plessis de Grenédan (du)	Extant	
Gréoux	Provence	04 Gréoux (-les-Bains)	1702	Audiffret (d')	Extinct 18th century	
Grimaud	Provence	83 Grimaud	1627	Alard	Extinct	
Grosbois	Île-de-France	94 Boissy-Saint-Léger	1734	Chauvelin (de)	Extinct (Sold 1761 to Peyrenc de Moras).	
Gueidan*	Provence	04 Castellet-lès-Sausses	1752	Gueidan (de)	Extinct 1853	
La Guerche	Bretagne	44 Saint Brévin	1682	Bruc de Montplaisir (de)	Extant	
Guiche (La), see Laguiche	Bourgogne					
Guinot, see Monconseil	Saintonge	17 Tesson				
Harcourt*	Normandie	50 Canville-la-Rocque	1817	Harcourt (d') (elder branch called d'Olonde)		
Haroué	Lorraine	54 Haroué	1623	Bassompierre (de)	Extinct 1646	
Hattonchatel	Lorraine	55 Hattonchatel	1609	Lorraine (de)		
Hautefort	Périgord	24 Hautefort	1614	Gontaut (de)	Extinct 1903	
Hauterive	Agenais	47 Hauterive	18th century	Raffin d'Hauterive (de)	Extinct	
Hauterive	Berry	18 La Celle-Condé	Louis XIII	L'Aubespine (de)	Extinct	
La Hautonnière	Maine	53 Fougerolles	1688			
Hautpoul*-Félines	Languedoc	34 Félines	1734	Hautpoul de Félines (d')	Extant	
Havrincourt	Artois	62 Havrincourt	1693	Cardevac d'Havrincourt (de)	Extant	
La Haye-du-Puits	Normandie	50 La Haye-du-Puits	1656	Faÿ (du)	Name change in 1776	
Heilly	Picardy	80 Heilly	c. 1621	Gouffier d'Heilly	Extinct 1777	
Hem	Flandre	59 Hem	1660	Vilain de Gand	Extinct 1818	
Herbault 1	Blésois	41 Herbault	1723	Dodun d'Herbault	Extinct 1736 /42	
Herbault 2	Blésois	41 Herbault	1743	Devezeaux de Rancougne (de)	Extinct 1963	
Héricourt	Artois	62 Héricourt	1779	Servins d'Héricourt (de)	Extinct 1917	
Hermanville	Normandie	14 Hermanville-sur-Mer	1651	Vauquelin	Extinct 1782	
Hesdigneul	Artois	62 Hesdigneul-les-Béthune	c. 1720	Béthune des Planques (de)	Extant	
Hesmond	Artois	62 Hesmond	c. 1696	Créqui-Hesmond (de)	Extinct 1801	
Heuchin	Artois	62 Heuchin	1691	Croix (de)	Extant	
Heudicourt	Normandie	27 Heudicourt	1666	Sublet d'Heudicourt	Extinct 1748	
Heudicourt*	Lorraine	54 Heudicourtt-sous-les-Côtes	1737	Sublet d'Heudicourt	Extinct; carried by the elder branch (of Lénoncourt)	
Hocqueville	Normandie	76	1654	Becdelièvre (de)	Extinct	
Hocquincourt	Picardy	80 Hocquincourt	Louis XIII	Monchy-Hocquincourt (de)	Extinct	
Houdancourt	Île-de-France	60	17th century	La Mothe-Houdancourt (de)	Extinct	
Houdetot*	Normandie	76 Graimbouville	1724	Houdetot (de)	Extant	
Houecourt	Lorraine	88 Houécourt	1721	Ligniville (de)		
Houelbourg	Guadeloupe	971 Baie-Mahaut	1706	Houël	Extinct	
Le Houssay	Orléanais	41 Houssay or 28 Theuville	1678	Mallier du Houssay	Extinct 1697	
Humeroeuille	Artois	62 Humeroeuille	1766	Belvalet (de)		
Humières	Artois	62	late 15th century	Humières (d')	Extinct 1867	
Huriel-Bartillat*	Bourbonnais	03 Huriel	1744	Jehannot de Bartillat	Extant	
Iles d'Or *(les) 1	Provence	83 Hyères	1531	Ornezan (d')	Extinct	
Iles d'Or (les) 2	Provence	83 Hyères	1549	Roquendorf (de)	Extinct, transféré	
Iles d'Or (les) 3	Provence	83 Hyères	1552	Luetz d'Aramon (de)	Eteint	
Iles d'Or (les) 4	Provence	83 Hyères	1573	Gondi (de)	Extinct	
Illiers (1)	Orléanais	28 Illiers-Combray	Henry IV	Daillon du Lude (de)	Extinct	
Illiers (2)	Orléanais	28 Illiers-Combray	1714	Phélypeaux	Extinct	
Imécourt	Champagne	08 Imécourt	c. 1700	Vassinhac d'Imécourt (de)	Extant	
Iranda	Navarre	64	1781	Arcangues d'Iranda (d')	Extant	
L'Isle-Bouzon	Armagnac	32 L'Isle-Bouzon	late 16th century	Galard de l'Isle (de)	Extinct 1928	
L'Isle-Jourdain	Poitou	86 L'Isle-Jourdain	Louis XIII	La Béraudière (de)	Extinct	
L'Isle-sous-Montréal	Champagne	89 L'Isle-sur-Serein	18th century	Mailly-Nesle (de)	Extant	
Isles	Champagne	10 Isle-Aumont	1547	(la Marck-) Clèves (de)	Duchy in 1665	
Itteville	Ile-de-France	91 Itteville	1670	Moucy (de)		
Ivergny	Artois	62 Ivergny				
Ivry	Bourgogne	21 Ivry-en-Montagne	1776	Richard de Curtil	Extant	
Jacqüot d'Andelarre*	Franche-Comté	Haute-Sâone, Andelarre	1777	Jacqüot d'Andelarre (de)	Extinct 1915	
Jalesne	Anjou	49 Vernantes	1634	Jalesne (de) then Maillé (de)	Extinct 1642; raised for Maillé de la Tour-Landry	
Janson	Provence	83 Saint-Estève-Janson	1626	Forbin-Janson (de)	Extinct 1906	
Jarzé (1)	Anjou	49 Jarzé	1615	du Plessis (de la Roche-Pichemer)		
Jarzé (2)	Anjou	49 Jarzé	1694	du Plessis de Jarzé	Extinct 1723	
Jarzé (3)	Anjou	49 Jarzé	1781	Foucault de Jarzé (de)	Extinct 1901	
Javerlhac	Périgord	24 Javerlhac				
Javon	Comtat-Venaissin	84 Lioux	1690	Baroncelli-Javon (de)	Extant	Papal title
Jocas	Comtat-Venaissin	84	1772	Brassier de Jocas (de)	Extant	Papal title
La Jonquière	Albigeois	81	1711	Taffanel de la Jonquière (de)	Extant	
Jouffroy*-d'Abbans	Franche-Comté	25 Abbans-Dessus	1707	Jouffroy d'Abbans (de)	Extant	
Jouques	Provence	13 Jouques	c. 1702	Arbaud de Jouques (d')	Extinct 1876	
Jouy	Ile-de-France	78 Jouy-en-Josas	1719	Bidal d'Asfeld	Extinct 1720	
Jucoville	Normandie	14 La Cambe	1736	Faoucq (de)	Extant	
Juigné	Maine	72 Juigné-sur-Sarthe	1762	Le Clerc de Juigné	Extinct 1951	
Jully	Champagne					
Jumel, or Jumelles	Picardy	80 Jumel	1678	Le Roy	Extinct	
Jumilhac	Périgord	24 Jumilhac -le-Grand	1655	Chapelle de Jumilhac	Extinct 1980	
Kerhoent*, or Querhoent	Orléanais	47 Montoire-sur-le-Loir	1743	Kerhoent (de)	Extinct	
Kerjean	Bretagne	29 Saint-Vougay	1618	Barbier de Kerjean	Extinct 1678	
Kerman	Bretagne	29 Lanilis				
Keroman	Île-de-France	94 and 60	1826	Dodun de Kéroman	Extant	
Kerveno	Bretagne	56 Pluméliau	1623	Kerveno (de)	Extinct 1734	
Lacapelle	Quercy	46 Lacapelle-Marival				
Laferté	Champagne	52 Laferté-sur-Amance		Choiseul (de)		
Lagnes	Comtat	84 Lagnes	1648	Cambis (de)		
Lagoy	Provence	13 St-Rémy-de-Provence	1702	Meyran-La Cetta (de)		
Laguiche or La Guiche	Bourgogne	(Majorat à localiser)	1822	Laguiche (de)	Extant	
Lalande	Champagne	89 Lalande		Deffand (du)		
Lally-Tollendal	Dauphiné	26	1825	Lally-Tollendal (de), previously Arthur	Extinct 1830	
Lancôme		36 Vendœuvres	1738	Savary		
Landiras	Guyenne	33 Landiras	1651	Montferrand (de)		
Langey	Dunois	28	1659	Cordouan (de)		
Laperrière	Bourgogne	21	1724	Lamy		
Larrey-Lenet*	Bourgogne	21 Larrey	1662	Lenet		
Lassay	Anjou	53 Lassay-les-Châteaux	1647	Madaillan de Lesparre (de)		
Lastronques	Comté de Foix	09	1771	Comminges (de)	Extinct 19th century.	
Latour-Maubourg	Velay	43 Saint-Maurice-de-Lignon	1817	Faÿ (de)	Extinct 1850	
Laval						
Laval-Lezay						
Lavardin	Maine	72 Mézières-sous-Lavardin	1601	Beaumanoir (de)		
Lavaur		24 Lavaur	1616	Gironde (de)		
Laxion	Périgord	24 Corgnac-sur-l'Isle	1653	Chapt de Rastignac		
Lebiez*	Artois or Picardy	60 Savignies	1664	Biez (de)		
Leforest	Artois	62 Leforest	1667	La Tramerie (de)		
Lens	Artois	62 Lens	1778			
Lespinasse*	Languedoc		1768	Lespinasse (de)		
Lestang	Dauphiné	26 Lens-Lestang	1643	Murat de Lestang		
Leuville 1		91	1650	Olivier		
Leuville 2		91	1700	Bois de Fiennes (du)		
Lèveville	Orléanais	28 Bailleau-l'Évêque	1729			
Lezay (1)	Poitou	79 Lezay	1642	Laval (de)		
Lezay 2	Poitou	79 Lezay	1643	Laval (de)		Name change to Laval-Lezay
Lezay*-Marnézia	Franche-Cté	39 Marnézia	1721	Lezay-Marnézia (de)		
Lézeau*, or La Motte-Lezeau	Normandie	61 Joué-du-Plain	1693	Ango de La Motte-Ango then Ango de La Motte-Ango de Flers	Extinct 1803	
Liancourt	Beauvaisis	60 Liancourt	1673	Plessis (du)		
Ligneris*	Orléanais	28 Méréglise	1776	Ligneris (de)		
Lignery						
Lignères	Picardy	Lignières-Chatelain	18th century			
Lillers	Artois	62 Lillers	1726			
Liré	Anjou	49 Liré	1760	La Bourdonnais (de)		
Lisbourg 1	Artois	62 Lisbourg	1634	Noyelles (de)		
Lisbourg 2	Artois	62 Lisbourg	1694	Volant de Berville		
Lisle-sous-Montréal	Bourgogne	L'Isle-sur-Serein	18th century	Mailly-Nesles (de)		
Listenois		52 Arc-en-Barrois	1578	Vienne (de)		Then to Bauffremont
Livarot	Normandie	14 Livarot	1649	d'Oraison later de Nicolle	Extant	Previously Baronie, raised by Louis XIV
Livry (en-Launoy)	Ile-de-France	93 Livry-Gargan	1688	Sanguin		
Llo	Roussillon	66 Llo	1750	Moracata de Salèlles (de)		
Locmaria	Bretagne	29 Plouegat-Guerand	1637	Parc-Locmaria (du)		
La Londe	Normandie	76 La Londe	1616	Bigars (de)		
Londres	Languedoc	34	1622	Roquefeuil (de)		
Longa	Périgord	24				
Longastre or Longatte	Artois	62 Ecoust-Saint-Mein	c. 1650			
Longjumeau	Ile-de-France	91 Longjumeau	1624	Coeffier		
Lonray 1	Normandie	61 Lonray	1644	Goyon-Matignon (de)		
Lonray 2	Normandie	61 Lonray	1685	Colbert de Seignelay		
Lons		64 Lons	1648	Lons (de)		
Loulans		70 Loulans	1718	Boitouset		
Louverval*		59 Noordpeene	1785	Louverval (de)		
Louvois 1	Champagne	51	1625	Pinart	Transmitted by marriage, sold 1656.	
Louvois 2	Champagne	51	1656	Le Tellier de Louvois	Sold 1776	
Le Luart		72 Le Luart	1726	Legras du Luart		
Lubersac		19				
Luc (Le) (-en-Provence)	Provence	83	1688	Lascaris-Vintimille (de)		
Ludres	Lorraine	54	1720	Ludres (de)	Extinct 1726	
Lugy		62 Lugy	1694	La Buissière (de)		
Lurcy		03 Lurcy-Lévis	1770	Sinéty (de)		
Lusignan-en-Agenais		47	1618	Lusignan (de)		
Lussac		86 Lussac-les-Châteaux	1761	Lignaud		
Magnanne	Maine	53 Ménil	1701	Racapé (de)	Extinct 1755	
Magnac	Marche	87 Magnac-Laval	1650	Salignac (de)	Extinct 1683	
Magny	Normandie	14 Magny-en-Bessin	1695	Foucault (de)	Extinct 1773	
Maignelay	Picardy	60	1565	Halluin (de)		
Maillane	Provence	13	1647	Porcellets (des)		
Maillebois (1)	Perche	28 Maillebois	1621	Pinart	Extinct 1651	
Maillebois (2)	Perche	28 Maillebois	1706	Desmaretz	Sold 1766	
Mailleraye (La) 1	Normandie	76 La Mailleraye-sur-Seine	1653	Grimouville (de)		
Mailleraye (La) 2	Normandie	76 La Mailleraye-sur-Seine	1698	Fabert (de)		
Mailleroncourt	Franche-Cté	70	1740	Terrier		
Mailloc	Normandie	14 Saint-Pierre-de-Mailloc	1693	Mailloc (de)		
Mailly	Picardy	80 Mailly-Maillet	1729	Mailly (de)		
Mailly*-Montcavrel	Artois	62	1691	Mailly (de)		
Maintenon 1	Orléanais	28 Maintenon	c. 1594	Angennes (d') de Rochefort de Salvert	Extinct 1674	
Maintenon 2	Orléanais	28 Maintenon	1688	Aubigné (d')	Extinct	
La Maisonfort	Perche or Nivernais	58 Bitry	1743	du Bois des Cours	Extinct 1838	
Maisons	Ile-de-Fce	78 Maisons-Lafitte	1658	Longueil (de)		
Malause	Quercy	82	1612	Bourbon-Malause (de)		
Maleville			1817	Maleville (de)		
Malfiance	Artois	62 Reclinghem	1787	Dion (de)		
Malherbe*-Juvigny	Normandie	14 Juvigny	1722			
Maniban*	Languedoc	32 Mauléon d'Armagnac	1681	Maniban (de)		
Manneville*-Charlemesnil	Normandie	76 Anneville-sur-Scie	1660	Manneville (de)		
Manœuvre	Ile-de-Fce	77 Vincy-Manœuvre	1653	Verthamon (de)		
Marbeuf	Corse-du-Sud	20A Cargèse (or Carghjese)	c. 1768-1774	Marbeuf (de)		
Marche (La)	Bourgogne	71 Villegaudin	1763	Fyot		
Mardogne	Auvergne	15 Joursac		Anjony (d')		
Marguerit*	Normandie	14 Versainville	1731	Marguerit de Versainville (de)		
Marie	Provence	06	1722	Lovera (de)		
Marignane	Provence	13 Marignane	1647	Covet (de)		
Marigny	Champagne	02 Marigny-en-Orxois	1754	Poisson de Vandières	Extinct	
Marivault	Picardy	60 Saint-Crépin-Ibouvillers	17th	Isle-Adam		
Marmier*	Franche-Cté	70 Séveux	1740	Marmier (de)		
Marnay	Franche-Cté	70	1602	Gorrevod (de)		
Marolles 1	Ile-de-Fce	77 Marolles-sur-Seine	1661	La Barde		
Marolles 2	Ile-de-fce	77	1723	Brion (de)		
Marzelière (La)	Bretagne	35 Bain	1618	Giffart		
Mathan	Normandie	50 Saint-Pierre-de-Semilly	1736	Mathan (de)	Extant	
Maubourg	Velay	43	1817	Faÿ (de)		
Maucomble	Normandie	76	1650			
Maule (1)	Ile-de-Fce	78	1667	Bullion (de)		
Maule (2)	Ile-de-Fce	78	1699	La Vieuville		
Maule (3)	Ile-de-fce	78	1707	Landouillette		
Maulévrier	Poitou	49	1818	Colbert de Maulévrier	Extinct 1891	
Mauny	Normandie	76	Louis XIII	Estampes (Maison d')	Extinct	
Maupas	Berry	18 Morogues	1725	Agard de Maupas	Extant	
Maupeou*	Anjou	86 Les Trois-Moutiers	1767	Maupeou (de)		
Mauregard 1	Picardy	77 Mauregard	1651	Amelot	Extinct 1726	
Mauregard 2	Picardy		1741	Le Cousturier		
Mayenne	Maine	53 Mayenne	1544	Lorraine-Guise	Branch extinct in 1621.	
Méjannes	Provence	30	1723	Piquet (de)		
Ménars 1	Orléanais	41 Menars	1676	Charron de Menars	Extinct 1760 (sold)	
Ménars 2	Orléanais	41 Menars	1769	Poisson (de Vandières et de Marigny)	Extinct 1781	
Ménessaire	Bourgogne	21 Ménessaire	1668			
Menou*	Nivernais	58 Menou	1697	Menou de Charnizay (de)	Extinct 1731	
Méréville	Île-de-France	91	1709	Delpech de Méréville	Extinct after 1761	
Méry	Ile-de-Fce	95 Méry-sur-Oise	1695	Saint-Chamant (de)		
Mesgrigny* 1	Champagne	10	1646	Mesgrigny (de)		
Mesgrigny 2	Champagne	10	1746	Mesgrigny (de)		
Mesplez*	Béarn	64 Esquiule	1732	Mesplez (de)		
Messei	Normandie	61	1686	Souvré (de), x Le Tellier		
Mézières	Touraine	36 Mézières-en-Brenne	1566	Anjou (d')	Extinct by the Revolution.	
Milhars	Languedoc	82	1653	Cazillac (de)		
Millas	Roussillon	66	1719	Blanes (de)		
Mimeure	Bourgogne	21	1697	Valon		
Mirabeau	Provence	84 Mirabeau	1685	Riqueti		
Mirabel	Languedoc	30	1746	Arlemde de Mirabel (d')	Extinct	
Miramont	Rouergue	12 Centrès		Cassagnes de Beaufort		
Mirebeau	Bourgogne	21 Mirebeau-sur-Bèze	17th	Chabot or Desbarres		
Miremont	Languedoc	31	1659			
Mirepoix	Languedoc	09		Lévis (de)		Duchy in 1751
Miribel	Bresse	01	1579	Savoie (de)		
Miromesnil	Normandie	76 Tourville-sur-Arques	1687	Hue		
Mison	Provence	04	1694	Armand (d')		
Modène	Comtat	84		Raymond		Papal title
Moges-Buron	Normandie	14 Saint-Georges-en-Auge	1725	Moges (de)		
Mogneville	Picardy	60	1635	Mesmes (de)		
Mognéville	Lorraine	55	1692	Choisy (de)		or Choiseul
Moissy-Cramayel	Ile-de-Fce	77 Moissy-Cramayel	1772	Fontaine (de Cramayel)		
Molinghem	Artois	62	1645	Bryas (de)		
Monconseil (or Guinot*)	Saintonge	17 Tesson	1728	Guinot (de)		
Mondicourt	Artois	62	1735	Beauffort (de)		
Monglas 1	Ile-de-Fce	77 Cerneux	1614	Harlay (de)		
Monglas 2	Ile-de-Fce	77 Cerneux	1706	Clermont (de)		
Monnier*	Franche-Cté	25	1713	Monnier		
Mons	Poitou	86	1655	Frézeau de la Frézelière		
Montaigu	Poitou	85	1696	Crux (de)		
Montaiguillon	Ile-de-Fce	77 Louan	1649	Autier de Villemontée		
Montaigut	Languedoc	31 Montaigut-sur-Save	1681	Le Masuyer	Extinct 1749	
Montalet	Languedoc	30				
Montataire	Picardy	60	1647	Madaillan (de)		
Montaudin*	Maine	53 Fougerolles	1676 /1688			
Montauroux	Provence	83	1675	Lombard (de)	Extinct 19th century	
Montauzier	Saintonge	16 Baignes	1644	Sainte-Maure (de)		
Montbrun	Dauphiné	26	1620; registered 1633	du Puy-Montbrun	Extant	
Montcavrel 1	Artois	62 Montcavrel	1687	Mailly (de)		
Montcavrel 2, known as Mailly*	Artois	62	1776	France (de)		
Montceaux	Ile-de-Fce	77 Montceaux-les-Meaux	1594	Estrées (d')		
Montciel	Franche-Cté	39 Lons-le-Saunier	1740	Terrier	Extinct 1831	
Montclar	Languedoc	12 or 30	1646	La Fare (de)		
Montclar, or Monclar	Provence	04 Montclar	1769	Ripert (de)	Extinct 1794	
Montcléra	Quercy	46	1616	Gironde (de)		
Montclus	Languedoc	30 Montclus	1683 or 1693	Vivet (de)	Extinct	
Montcornet	Champagne	08 Montcornet (-en-Ardennes)		Croy (de)		
Montécler*	Maine	72	1616	Montécler (de)		
Montellier (Le)	Bresse	01 Briord	1583	Montbel (de)		
Montendre	Guyenne	17	1789	Brosse (de)		
Montespan	Languedoc	32	1612	Pardaillan de Gondrin (de)	Extinct 1757	
Montesson*	Maine	53 Bais	1660	Montesson (de)		
Montfermeil	Ile-de-Fce	93 Montfermeil	1777	Hocquart		
Montferrat	Dauphiné	38	1750	Barral-Montferrat (de)	Extant	
Montferrer 1	Roussillon	66	1675	Banyuls de Montferrer (de)	Extinct 1693	
Montferrer 2	Roussillon	66	1694	Banyuls de Montferrer (de)	Extinct 1971	
Montferrier	Languedoc	34	1762	Vidal (de)		
Montfort-le-Rotrou (1)	Maine	72	1616	Plessis-Liancourt (du)		
Montfort-le-Rotrou (2)	Maine	72	c. 1660	Bresseau (de)		
Montfrin	Languedoc	30	1644	Monteynard		
Montfuron	Provence	04	1690	Valbelle (de)		
Montgaillard	Languedoc	31	1671	Percin (de)		
Montgauger or Mongogier	Touraine	37 Saint-Épain	1623	Gast (du)		
Montigny	Champagne	89 Perreux	c. 1704	Montigny		
Montigny	Ile-de-Fce	Montigny-en-Brie	1651	Le Boulanger		
Montigny	Picardy	02 Montigny-les-Condé	1651			
Montigny	Champagne	21 Montigny-sur-Aube	1689	Barillon		
Montireau alias Aligre	Perche	Eure-et-Loire, Montireau	1752	Aligre de Marans (d')	Extinct 1889	
Montjeu	Bourgogne	71 Broye	1655	Jeannin de Castille		
Montlaur (1)	Languedoc	34 Montaud	1679	Bousquet (de)		
Montlaur (2)	Languedoc	34 Montaud	1787	Villardi de Quinson (de)		
Montlhéry	Ile-de-Fce	91				
Montlouet	Perche	28				
Montlouis	Touraine	37 Montlouis-sur-Loire	1717	Courcillon de Dangeau		
Montmélian	Champagne	08	1655	Coigneux (de)		
Montmiral	Dauphiné	26	1710	Mistral (de)		
Montmort	Champagne	51	1767	Rémond		
Montpezat (1)	Languedoc	30	1611	Trémolet (de)		
Montpezat (2)	Languedoc	30	1665	Trémolet		
Montpipeau	Orléanais	45 Huisseau	1765	du Cluzel		
Montrichard*	Franche-Cté	39	1744	Montrichard de Visemal (de)		
Monts	Poitou	86 Monts-sur-G.				
Morangles	Picardy	60	1666	Belloy (de)		
Morant*	Normandie	50 Le Mesnil-Garnier	1672	Morant (de)		
Morbecque	Flandres	59	1629	Montmorency		
Morsan (or Morsent)	Normandie	27 Morsan	1686	Le Sens		
Mortemart	Marche	87		Rochechouart (de)		
La Mothe* or Brunvilliers 2	Picardy	60 Brunvillers-la-Motte	1700	La Motte-Houdancourt	Extinct 1719; sold	
La Mothe-Fénelon	Quercy	46 Lamothe-Fénelon		Salignac		
La Mothe-Lézeau	Normandie	14 Acqueville	1693	Ango		
La Mothe-Harcourt*	Normandie	14 Cesny-Bois-Halbout	1593	Harcourt (d')		
La Mothe Saint-Héray (1)	Poitou	79 La Mothe-Saint-Héray	1633	Baudéan (de)		
La Mothe Saint-Héray (2)	Poitou	79 La Mothe-Saint-Héray	1723	Artaguiette d'Iron (d')	Extinct 1748	
La Motte (1)	Poitou	86 Trois-Moustiers	1700	Lamoignon		La Motte-Champdeniers
La Motte (2)	Poitou	86 Trois-Moustiers	1767	Maupéou (de)		
Mottes	Picardy		1680	Ennetières (d')		
La Moussaye	Bretagne	22 Plénée-Jugon	1615	Goyon-Matignon (de)	Extinct 17th century	
Moustier*	Franche-Cté	25 Cubry	1741	Moustier (de)	Extant	
Moy (1)	Picardy	02	1606	Moy (de)		
Moy (2)	Picardy	02	1722	Crozat		
Moy de Sons	Lorraine		1748			
Mun			1817	Mun (de)		
Murat-Sistrières	Corse	20	1776	Istria (d')		
Murinais	Dauphiné	38		Auberjon (d')		
Murles	Languedoc	34				
La Musse	Bretagne	44				
Muy (Le)	Provence	83	1697	Félix (de)		
Myennes	Nivernais	58	1661	Vielbourg (de)		
Nabassan	Languedoc		1657	Castelnau (de)		
Nangis (1 and 2)	Ile-de-France	77 Nangis	1612	Brichanteau (de)	Extinct 1742	
Nangis (3)	Ile-de-France	77 Nangis	1749	Régnier de Guerchy	Extinct 1832	
Narbonne-Pelet*	Languedoc	30 Combas	1699	Pelet (de)		
Naucase	Auvergne	15 Saint-Julien-de-Toursac				
Nazelle*	Champagne	02 Neufchâtel-sur-Aisne	1753	Du Cauzé de Nazelle	Extant	
Nedde	Limousin	87 Nedde	1655	Blanchier de Pierre-Buffière (de)	Extinct 1707	
Nédonchel 1	Artois	62 Nédonchel	1694	Carnin (de)		
Nédonchel 2	Artois		1723	Nédonchel (de)		
Néré	Saintonge	17	1576			
Nerestang*	Languedoc, Velay	43 Aurec-sur-Loire	1619	Nerestang	Extinct 1733	
Nesle 1		80 Nesle	1545	Sainte Maure (de)	Extinct	
Nesle 2		80 Esmery-Hallon	1704	Mailly-Nesles (de)		
Neuvic		24				
Neuville	Île-de-France	78 Gambais	1671	Vallot	Extinct (sold)	
Neuville*	Franc-Lyonnais	69 Neuville-sur-Saône	1666	Neuville-Villeroy (de)		
Noaillac		47 Pennes d'Agenais	1606			
Noblet d'Anglure		71	1715			
La Nocle		58	1644			
Noé		31				
Nointel		60	1654			
Noirmoutier		85	1584			
Nolay		21				
Nolivos		64 Autevielle	1782			
Nomeny		54	1567			
Nonant-le-Pin		61				
Noviant		54 Noviant-aux-Prés	1722			
Noyelle		62 Noyelle-Vion	1698			
Noyelles		62 Noyelles-sous-Lens				
Nozières		07				
Œufs	Artois	62 Œuf-en-Ternois	1766	Bertoult (de)	Extant	
Oilliamson*	Normandie	14 St Germain-Langot	1739	Oilliamson (d')	Extant	
Oisonville, or Oysonville	Orléanais	28 Oysonville	1664	Le Prévost	Extinct 1679	
Ollières	Provence	83 Ollières	1689	Agoult (d')		
Olivet						
Olonne	Comtat	84 Vaison-la-Romaine	1755	Tillia (de)		
Oms	Roussillon	66 Oms	1767	Oms (d')	Extinct 1915	
Oraison 1	Provence	04 Oraison	1588	Oraison (d')	Extinct (Sold 1720)	
Oraison 2	Provence	04 Oraison	1740	Fulque (de)		
Orchères (or Orgères)		78	17th century	Potier		
Oresmaux	Picardy					
Ormesson*	Ile-de-France	94 Ormesson-sur-Marne	1758	Lefèvre d'Ormesson	Extant	
Ornacieux	Dauphiné	38 Ornacieux	1645	La Croix (de)	Extant	
Osmond* 1	Normandie	61 Aubry-le-Panthou	1719	Osmond (d')	Extinct 1771	
Osmond 2	Normandie	61 Aubry-le-Panthou	1817	Osmond (d')	Extinct 1904	
Ossun	Bigorre	65 Ossun	1767	Ossun (d')		
Ouessant	Bretagne	29 Ouessant	1597	Rieux (de)	Extinct 1713 or 1764	
Ozillac	Saintonge	17 Ozillac	1623	Sainte-Maure (de)	Extinct 1648	
Le Palais	Forez	42 Civens, and 42 Feurs	1626	Rivoire (de)	Extinct 1737	
La Palisse or La Palice	Bourbonnais	03 Lapalisse	1724	Brunet d'Évry, then Chabannes (de)	Extinct 1730, renewed (Extant)	
La Paluelle	Normandie	50 Saint James	1653	La Paluelle (de)	Extinct 1684	
Pange	Lorraine	57 Pange	1766	Thomas de Pange	Extant	
Panilleuse	Normandie					
Paroy 1	Champagne	77 Paroy	1685	Mascrany (de)	Extinct	
Paroy 2	Champagne	77 Paroy	1754	Le Gentil	Extinct 1882	
Pegayrolles*	Languedoc	12 Castelnau-Pegayrols	1759	Julien de Pegayrolles	Extinct end of 19th century	
Les Pennes	Provence	13 Les Pennes-Mirabeau	1678	Vento (de)	Extinct	
Pérignon	Languedoc	31	1817	Pérignon (de)		
Persan	Île-de-France	95 Persan	1763	Doublet de Persan	Extinct 1828, renewed for a cadet branch (Extant)	
Peynier	Provence	13 Peynier	1743	Thomassin (de)		
Peyrelongue	Guyenne	47	1785	Auber de Peyrelongue	Extant	
Pierrefeu	Provence	83 Pierrefeu-du-Var	1682	Dedons then Deydier de Pierrefeu	Extinct in 19th century	
Pignan	Languedoc	34 Pignan	1721	Baschi du Cayla (de)	Extinct	
Piquecos	Quercy	82 Piquecos	1707	Forest (de)		
Pisany	Saintonge	17 Pisany	1586	Vivonne (de)	Extinct 1737 (sold)	
Pissy	Picardy	80 Pissy	1820	Chassepot de Pissy (de)		
Plancy	Champagne	10 Plancy-l'Abbaye	1656	Plessis-Guénégaud (du)	Sold 1714	
Plasnes						
Plessis-Chateaubriant						
Plessis-Châtillon						
Pleumartin	Poitou	86 Pleumartin	1652	Ysoré d'Hervault	Extinct 1917	
Pleure	Franche-Comté	39 Pleure	1661	Poly (de)		
Pleurre or Pleurs	Champagne	51 Pleurs	1661	Pontaillé (de), then Pleurre (de)	Extinct 1674; Extinct 1923	
Pluvault						
Pluvinel*	Dauphiné	26 La Rochette	1693	La Baume de Pluvinel (de)	Extinct 1938	
Pomereu*	Soissonnais	02	1825	Pomereu d'Aligre (de)		
Pompadour	Limousin	19 Arnac-Pompadour	1745	Poisson	Extinct	
Pomponne	Ile-de-France	77 Pomponne	1682	Arnaud d'Andilly	Extinct, confirmé pour les Feydeau	
Ponceaux	Picardy	60 Montreuil-sur-Brèche	1723	Paris de la Brosse		
Pont-à-Mousson	Lorraine	54 Pont-à-Mousson	1353	Bar (de)	Transfer in 1430	
Pont-à-Mousson	Lorraine	54 Pont-à-Mousson	1430	Anjou (d')	Transfer (inherited 1536) with the duchy of Bar to the House of Lorraine.	
Pont (-à-Mousson)	Lorraine	54 Pont-à-Mousson	1480	Lorraine-Vaudémont (de)	Attached to the Crown (1766) with Barrois and Lorraine	
Pontcallec	Bretagne	56 Berné	1657	Guer (de)		
Pontchartrain						
Pontecroix (1)	Bretagne	29 Pont-Croix				
Pontecroix (2)	Bretagne	29 Pont-Croix	1719	Le Sénéchal de Kercado		
Le Pont-en-Royans	Dauphiné	38 Pont-en-Royans	1617	Sassenage (de)		
Pontevès*	Provence	83 Hyères	1691	Pontevès (de)		
Pontonx	Guyenne	40 Pontonx-sur-l'Adour	1651	Saint-Martin (de)		
Porquerolles						
Portes*	Languedoc	09 Manses	1747	Portes (de)	Extinct 1940	
Portes-Bertrand	Vivarais	30 Portes	1613	Budos (de)	Extinct	
Pouy-Coregelard (known as Roquépine)	Guyenne	32 Pouy-Roquelaure	1671	Bouzet (du)	Extinct 1752, renewed for other branches	
Pouzolles			1680	Ortolan (d')		
Pradère						
Praslin						
Presles						
Prunevaux			1688	Foullé de Martangis		
Puivert			1680	Roux (de)		
Pusignan			1679	Chauderon		
Puylaroque	Languedoc	82 Labastide-St Pierre	1685	Vignes (de)	Extant	
Puységur	Gascogne	32	1822	Chastenet de Puységur	Branch titled Marquis Extinct	
Quérénaing	Flandres	59	1698	Haynin (de)	Extinct	
Quérieux	Picardy	80 Querrieu	1652	Gaudechard (de)	Extinct 1878	
Le Quesnoy	Normandie	50 Saint-Martin des Champs	1714	Quesnoy (du)	Extinct 1897	
Le Quesnoy	Flandres	59 Quesnoy-sur-Deûle	1661	Mailly (de)		
Le Quesnoy	Picardy	60 Sains-Morainvilliers				
Le Quesnoy*	Flandres	Belgique	1694	Quesnoy (du)		
Quévilly	Normandie	76 Le Grand-Quévilly	1654	Becdelièvre (de)	Extinct 1789	
Rabodanges*	Normandie	61 Rabodanges	1649	Rabodanges (de)	Extinct	
Ragny	Bourgogne	89 Savigny-en-Terre-Plaine	1597	La Magdelaine de Ragny (de)	Extinct	
Raincourt*	Franche-Comté	70 Fallon	1719	Raincourt (de)		
Rambouillet	Ile-de-France	78 Rambouillet	1612	Angennes (d')	Extinct 1652	
Raray* or Néry-Raray	Ile-de-France	60 Raray	1654	Lancy (de)	Extinct	
Rasnes or Rânes	Normandie	61 Rânes	1672	Argouges (d')	Extinct 1787	
Rastignac	Périgord	24 La Bachellerie	1617	Chapt (de)	Extinct	
Les Réaulx*	Champagne	10 Coclois	1690	Réaulx (des)	Extinct	
Recologne	Franche-Comté	25 Recologne	1746	Camus (de)		
Régusse	Provence	83 Régusse	1649	Grimaud also known as Grimaldi (de)		
Reignac*, alias Raignac	Touraine	37 Reignac-sur-Indre	1710	Barberin	Extinct	
Rémoncourt	Lorraine	88 Rémoncourt	1621			
Renty	Artois	62 Renty	1532	Croÿ (de)		
Réveillon	Perche	61 Réveillon				
Reverseaux	Perche	28 Rouvray-Saint-Florentin	1766	Guéau		
Reynel	Champagne	52 Reynel	1560	Croÿ (de)		
Rians	Provence	83 Rians	1657	Fabri (de)	Extinct	
Ribaute	Languedoc	30 Ribaute-les-Tavernes	16th century	Hours (des)		
Ricard*	Provence	13 Mouriès	1718	Ricard (de)		
Les Riceys	Bourgogne	10 Les Riceys	1718	Pomereu (de)		
La Rivière*	Beaujolais	69 and 42	1719	La Rivière (de)		
Roche, or Brun*	Franche-Comté	25 Arc-et-Senans	1694	Brun (de)	Extinct 1746	
La Roche	Provence	13 or 84 Lauris	1723 or 1733	Arlatan (d')	Extinct 1837	
Rochecotte or Rochecot	Touraine	37 Saint-Patrice	1767	Guillon		
La Roche-Courbon*	Orléanais	89 Saint-Sauveur-en-Puisaye	1649	Courbon (de)		
La Roche Helgomarc'h or la Roche-Laz	Bretagne	29 Saint Thois	1576	Mesgouez (de)	Extinct	
Rochemore-Saint-Côme	Languedoc	30 Saint-Côme-et-Maruejols	1751	Rochemore (de)		
Rocozels	Languedoc	34 Ceilhe-et-Rocozels	1724	Rosset (de)	Extinct 1815	
Roissy	Ile-de-France	95 Roissy-en-France		Mesmes d'Avaux (de)	Extinct 1733	
Romilley*	Bretagne	35 Saint Georges de Reintembault et Trans-la-Forêt	1641 or 1644	Romilley (de)	Extinct 1767	
La Roque d'Anthéron (or La R.-Gontard) 1	Provence	13 La Roque d'Anthéron	1653	Forbin (de)	Extinct	
La Roque d'Anthéron 2	Provence	13 La Roque d'Anthéron	1696	Milani (de)		
Roquefeuil	Rouergue	12 Saint-Jean-du-Bruel	1618	Roquefeuil-Blanquefort (de)	Extinct 1639	
Roquefort	Provence	13 Roquefort-la-Bédoule	1736	Bausset-Roquefort (de)	Extant	
Roquefort	Guyenne	40 Roquefort	1739	La Salle (de)		
Roquefort-Sommery	Normandie	76 Roquefort	1687	du Mesnil		
Roquelaure*	Languedoc	32 Roquelaure-Saint-Aubin	1766	Roquelaure (de)	Extinct 1811	
Roquemartine (1)	Provence	13 Eyguières	1671	Aube (d')		
Roquemartine (2)	Provence	13 Eyguières	1701	Benault de Lubières		
Roqueservière*	Gévaudan	48 Saint-Étienne-Vallée-Française	1752	Borelli		
La Roquette (1–2)	Provence	83 Montmeyan	1651	Foresta (de)then Maurelet	Extinct 1819, relevé	
La Roquette	Provence	83	1821	Foresta (de)	Extant	
Rosay (1)	Ile-de-France	78 Rosay	1671	Briçonnet		
Rosay (2)	Ile-de-France	78 Rosay	1705	Le Clerc de Lesseville		
Rosay	Normandie	27 Rosay-sur-Lieurre	1680	Frémont (de)		
Rosmadec* (or Pont-Croix 1)	Bretagne	29 Pont-Croix	1608 or 1618	Rosmadec (de)	Extinct 1700	
Rosny	Île-de-France	78 Rosny-sur-Seine	1601	Béthune-Sully (de)	Extinct	
Rosanbo	Bretagne	22 Lanvellec	1822	Le Peletier de Rosanbo	Extant	
Rothelin	Allemagne	Lörrach (Bade-Wurtemberg)		Orléans-Rothelin (bastard branch of the Orléans-Longueville)	Extinct 1764	
Roubaix	Flandre	59 Roubaix	1579	Melun (de)		
Rougé	Bretagne	44	1825	Rougé (de)	Extant	
Rougemont	Bresse	01 Aranc	1694	Grenaut (de)	Extinct 1710, renewed	
Rouillac	Languedoc	32 Gimbrède	1612 or 1616	Goth (de)	Extinct 1690	
Rousset	Comtat	26 Rousset-les-Vignes	1690		Extinct	
Roussy de Sales	Savoie	74 Thorens-Glières	1821 and 1857	Roussy de Sales (de)	Extant	
Royan	Saintonge	17 Royan	1592	La Tremoille (de)		
Royon	Artois	62 Royon	1692	Bryas (de)		
Ruffec (1)	Angoumois	16 Ruffec	1588	Volvire (de)	Extinct 1604	
Ruffec (2)	Angoumois	16 Ruffec	1651	L'Aubespine (de)	Extinct 1763 (sold)	
Rumont	Ile-de-France	77 Rumont	1657	Montliart (de)	Extinct 1915	
Sablé 1	Maine	72	1544	Lorraine (de) (branch of Guise)	Transfer (sold) 1593	.
Sablé 2	Maine	72	1602	Montmorency-Laval (de)	Transfer (sold) 1648	
Sablé 3	Maine	72	1656	Servien	Transfer (sold) 1711; Extinct	
Sablé 4	Maine	72	1711	Colbert de Torcy	Extinct after 1787	
Sadirac	Béarn	66 Taron	1787	Casamajor (de)		
Sagnières	Dauphiné	05	1664			
Saint Aignan	Normandie	14 Saint-Aignan de Cramesnil	1765	La Fresnaye (de)		
Saint Andéol en Quint	Dauphiné	26	1688	Gramont (de)		
Saint Andiol	Provence	13 Saint-Andiol	1656	Grille de Robiac (de)		
Saint-André	Bugey	01 Briord	1589	Montbel	Extinct	
Saint Aubin	Bourgogne	71 Saint-Aubin-sur-Loire	1718	Le Gendre		
Saint Blimont	Picardy	80	1682	Saint Blimont (de)		
Saint Brice	Bretagne	35 Saint-Brice-en-Coglès	1645	Volvire (de)		
Saint Bris 1	Bourgogne	89 Saint-Bris-le-Vineux	1619	Coligny (de)		
Saint Bris 2			1644	Lambert (de)		
Sainte-Marie	Guadeloupe	971 Capesterre-Belle-Eau	c. 1660	Boisseret (de)	Extinct	
Sainte-Marie alias Agneaux	Normandie	Manche, Agneaux	b1740	Sainte-Marie d'Agneaux (de)	Extant	supposedly based on 48 lesser fiefs
Saint Geniès	Périgord	24 Saint-Geniès	1659	Montault-Bénac (de)	Extinct	
Saint-Geniès	Rouergue	34 St-Geniès-de-Fontedit	1760	Baderon de Maussac-Thézan (de)		
Saint Genix-Beauregard	Savoie	73 Saint-Genix-sur-Guiers	1700	Costa de Beauregard	Extant	
Saint-Martin-de-Pallières	Provence	83	1661 (or 1671)	Laurens (de)	Extinct	
Saint-Maurice	Languedoc	34 Saint-Maurice-Navacelles	1753	Barbeyrac de Saint-Maurice	Extant	
Saint-Pantaléon	Comtat	26 St-Pantaléon-les-V.ignes				
Saint-Phal	Champagne	10		Vaudrey (de)	Extinct 18th century	
Saint-Pois	Normandie	50	1717	d'Auray de Saint-Pois	Extinct 1973	
Saint-Rambert	Bugey	01 St-Rambert-en-Bugey	1576	Savoie (de) (bastard branch of the House of Savoy)	Extinct 1716	
Saint-Sorlin	Bugey	01	1460	Savoie (de) (branch of Princes of Genevois, Dukes of Nemours)	Extinct	
Saint-Victor			1829	Castillon de Saint-Victor	Extinct	
Salernes	Provence	83	1653	Galléan des Issards (de)	Extinct 1925	
Santans	Fr-Comté	39 Santans	1821	Terrier		
Savines	Dauphiné	05 Savines-le-Lac	1715	La Font (de)	Extinct 1748	
Seignelay	Bourgogne	89 Seignelay	1668	Colbert (de)	Extinct 1747	
Seillons	Provence	83 Seillons	1714	Raousset (de)	Extinct	
Sénégas	Rouergue		1864	Durand de Bonne	Extinct	
Sévigné						
Sigoyer	Provence	83	1719	Laidet (de)		
Sillery	Champagne	51	1631	Brulart de Sillery	Extinct 1770	
Simiane	Provence	13	1684	Simiane (de)	Extinct beginning of 19th century	
Spada	Lorraine	55	1716	Spada (de)	Extinct after 1868.	
Tanlay	Bourgogne	89 Tanlay	1671	Phélipeaux	Extinct	
Tantonville	Lorraine	54 Tantonville	1763	Ourches (d')		
Terraube	Gascogne	32 Terraube	1683	Galard (de)	Extant	
Thémines	Quercy	46 Thémines	1612	Lauzières (de)	Extinct 1646	
Thiboutot*	Normandie	76 Maniquerville	1720	Thiboutot (de)		
Thibouville	Normandie	27 Thibouville	1670	Lambert d'Herbigny	Extinct 1784; renewed	
Thil (Le)	Normandie	27 Morgny-la-Forêt	1659	Jubert	Abolished 1688	
Thorigné	Maine	72 Thorigné-sur-Dué	1654		Confirmed 1723	
Thouarcé	Anjou	49 Thouarcé	1608	du Bellay	Extinct 1637, renewed	
Thuisy	Champagne	Aube or Marne	1680	Goujon de Thuisy	Extinct	
Thury	Normandie	14 Thury-Harcourt	1578	Montmorency (de)	Sold (1635)	
Tillay (Le)	Ile-de-France	95 Le Tillay	1651	Girard	Extinct 1673	
Tilly d'Orceau*	Normandie	14 Tilly-sur-Seulles	1766	Orceau (d')	Extinct	
Tinténiac	Bretagne	35 Tinténiac	1598	Tinténiac Laval (de)	Extinct	
Tourette d'Ambert (La)*	Quercy	46 Bétaille	1749	Ambert (d')	Extinct	
Tournelle (La)	Nivernais	58 Arleuf	1681	Tournelle (de La)	Extinct 1740	
Tourny	Normandie	27 Tourny	1686	Montfort (de)	Extinct	
Tourves	Provence	83 Tourves	1678	Valbelle (de)		
Tourzel	Auvergne	63 Tourzel-Ronzières	1576	Alègre (d')	Confirmed 1742; Sold 1766	
Trans	Provence	83 Trans-en-Provence	1506	Villeneuve (de)	Remaining 20th marquis in 1998	
Treffort	Bresse	01 Treffort	1586	Rye (de)	Extinct	
Trélon	Flandres	59 Trélon	1626	Mérode (de)		
Tréon		28 Tréon	1661	Courseulles (de)	Extinct	
Tresnel	Champagne	10 Trainel	1587	Juvenel des Ursins	Extinct 1650; renewed	
Trousse (La)	Ile-de-France	77 Ocquerre	1651 or 1615	Le Hardy	Extinct 1691	
Tullier*	Languedoc	12 Montrozier	1761	Tullier (de)		
Turbilly	Anjou	49 Volandry	1750	Menon (de)	Extinct 1776	
Tymeur (Le)	Bretagne	29 Poullaouen	1616	Ploeuc (de)	Extinct	
Uchon	Bourgogne	71 Uchon	1682	Martigny (de)		
Urbino	Corse	20 Ghisonaccia	1789	Gauthier		
Ussé	Touraine	37 Rigny-Ussé	1692	Bernin de Valentinay	Extinct 1772	
Usson	Auvergne	63 Usson				
Uxelles	Bourgogne	71 Chapaize	1618	Blé (du)	Extinct 1730	
Valbonnais	Dauphiné	38	1694	Moret de Bourchenu	Eteint	
Valençay	Berry	36	1620	House of Estampes	Extinct 1742	
Valence	Guyenne	47	1653	de Timbrune de Valence	Extinct 1822	
Valromey	Bugey	01 Virieu-le-Grand	1612	d'Urfé	Extinct 1625	
Varambon	Bresse	01 Varambon	1576	Rye (de)	Extinct	
Vatan	Berry	36 Vatan	1650	Aubéry	Extinct	
Vaulserre, alias Corbeau	Dauphiné	38 Saint-Albin de Vaulserre	1751	Corbel-Corbeau de Vaulserre (de)	Extinct 1976	
Vauvenargues	Provence	13 Vauvenargues	1722	Clapiers Seguiran (de)		
Vayres	Guyenne	33	1659	Gourgues (de)		
Vibraye	Sarthe	72	1625	Hurault de Vibraye	Extant	
Villacerf-le-Grand*	Champagne	10	1670	Colbert		
Villaines-la-Juhel	Maine	53	1587	de Champagne		
Villandry*, or Colombières (2)	Touraine	37 Villandry	1738	Aubigné (d')	Extinct	
Villars	Bresse	01 Villars-les-Dombes	1565	Savoie (de)		
Villecomte	Bourgogne	21	1717	Follin		
Villegongis alias Barbançois*-Villegongis	Berry	Indre, Villegongis	1767	Barbançois (de)	Extinct 1915	
Villemont	Auvergne	63 Vensat	1720	Veyny d'Arbouze de Marcillac (de)	Extinct 20th century	
Villaines or Villennes	Maine	72 Louplande	1767; 1777	Aux de Villaines (d')	Extinct 1963	
Villeneuve-Mesgrigny	Champagne	10	1646	Mesgrigny (de)		
Villeray		61 Condeau	1707	Riants (de)	Extinct	
Villeroy	Ile-de-France	91 Mennecy	1615	Neufville de Villeroy (de)	Extinct 1794	
Villers-Vaudey	Fche-Cté	70 Villers-Vaudey	c. 1749	Richard de Villers		
Ville-sur-Illon	Lorraine	88 Ville-sur-Illon	1703	Hurault de Manoncourt		
Villiers-Saint-Georges	Ile-de-France	77 Villiers-Saint-Georges	1673	Hotman		
Vincly	Artois	Pas-de-Calais, Vincly	1676	Assignies (d')	Extinct 1753	
Vins	Provence	83 Vins-sur-Caramy	1641	Garde de Vins (de)	Extinct 1731	
Virieu	Dauphiné	38 Virieu	1655	Prunier	Extinct	
Viriville	Dauphiné	38 Viriville	1639	Grollée (de)	Extinct	
Vizille	Dauphiné	38 Vizille	1606	Bonne de Lesdiguières (de)	Extinct	
Volx (also known as Vaux, Vaulx)	Provence	04	1652	Valavoire (de)	Extinct	
Wamin	Artois	62	1693 or 1709	Fléchin (de)		
Wargnies	Flandres	Nord	1651	Anneux (d')		
Wavrin-Villers-au-Tertre	Flandres	59	1767	Wavrin (de)		
Willeman	Artois	62	1761	Lhoste		
