= Arvillard =

Arvillard Arvelâ (Savoyard)
- Commune
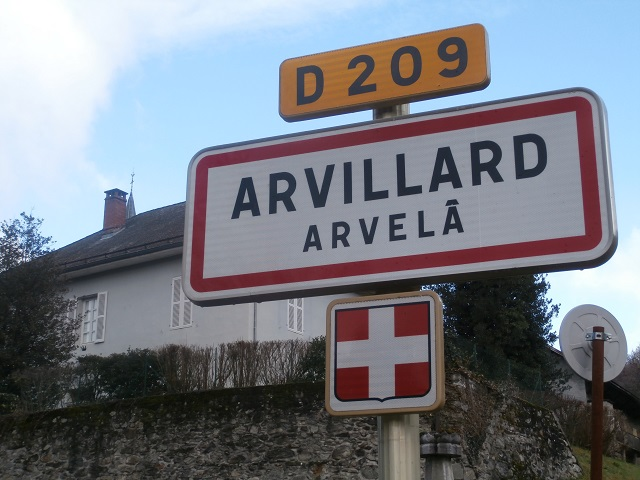
- A road sign in Arvillard

- Coat of arms
- Location of Arvillard
- Location within France Location within Auvergne-Rhône-Alpes
- Coordinates: 45°26′32″N 6°07′14″E
- Country: France
- Region: Auvergne-Rhône-Alpes
- Department: Savoie
- Arrondissement: Chambéry
- Canton: Montmélian
- Intercommunality: CC Cœur de Savoie

Government
  - Mayor (2020–2026): Georges Communal
- Area^{1}: 29.28 km^{2} (11.31 sq mi)
- Highest elevation: 2,760 m (9,060 ft)
- Lowest elevation: 400 m (1,300 ft)
- Population (2023): 861
  - Density: 29.4/km^{2} (76.2/sq mi)
- Time zone: UTC+01:00 (CET)
  - Summer (DST): UTC+02:00 (CEST)
- INSEE/Postal code: 73021 /73110
- Website: www.arvillard.fr
- ^{1} French Land Register data, which excludes lakes, ponds, glaciers > 1 km^{2} (0.386 sq mi or 247 acres) and river estuaries.

Arvillard (Arpitan: Arvelâ) is a commune in the Savoie department in the Auvergne-Rhône-Alpes region in south-eastern France.

== See also ==
- Communes of the Savoie department
