= Souancé-au-Perche =

- Commune
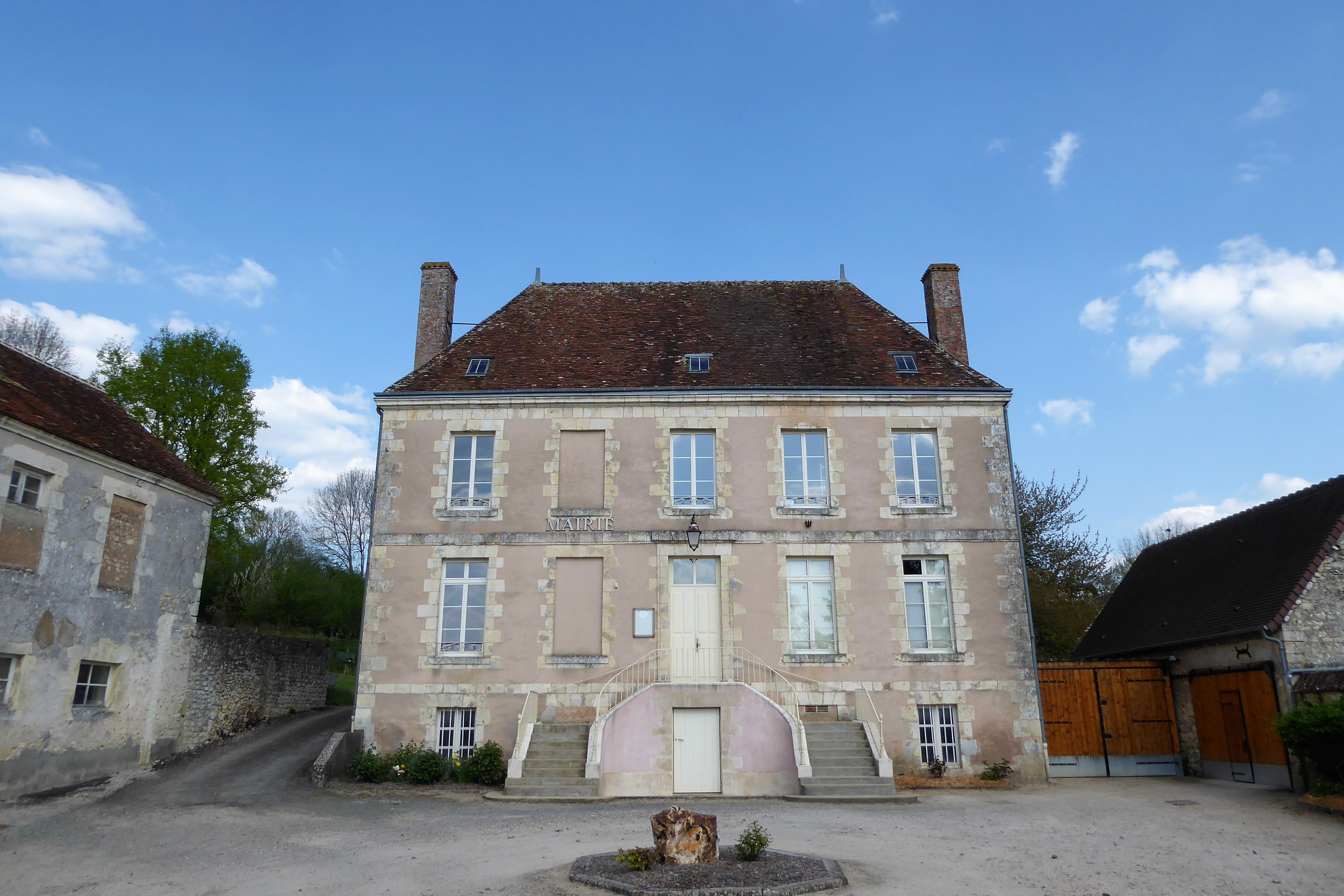
- The town hall in Souancé-au-Perche

- Coat of arms
- Location of Souancé-au-Perche
- Location within France Location within Centre-Val de Loire
- Coordinates: 48°16′04″N 0°51′20″E
- Country: France
- Region: Centre-Val de Loire
- Department: Eure-et-Loir
- Arrondissement: Nogent-le-Rotrou
- Canton: Nogent-le-Rotrou
- Intercommunality: Perche

Government
  - Mayor (2021–2026): Marie-Claude Rigot
- Area^{1}: 18.94 km^{2} (7.31 sq mi)
- Elevation: 142 m (466 ft)
- Highest elevation: 270 m (890 ft)
- Lowest elevation: 123 m (404 ft)
- Population (2023): 486
  - Density: 25.7/km^{2} (66.5/sq mi)
- Time zone: UTC+01:00 (CET)
  - Summer (DST): UTC+02:00 (CEST)
- INSEE/Postal code: 28378 /28400
- ^{1} French Land Register data, which excludes lakes, ponds, glaciers > 1 km^{2} (0.386 sq mi or 247 acres) and river estuaries.

Souancé-au-Perche (French pronunciation: [swɑ̃se o pɛʁʃ]) is a commune in the Eure-et-Loir department in northern France.

== Population ==
Historical population
Year	Pop.	±% p.a.
1968	551	—
1975	530	−0.55%
1982	579	+1.27%
1990	547	−0.71%
1999	514	−0.69%
2007	554	+0.94%
2012	542	−0.44%
2017	532	−0.37%
2023	486	−1.50%
Source: INSEE

== See also ==
- Communes of the Eure-et-Loir department
