= Vindecy =

- Commune
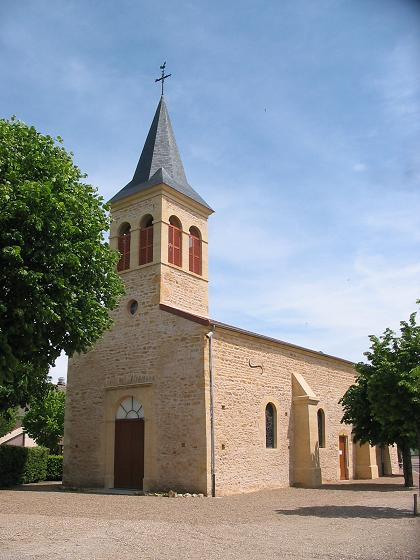
- The church in Vindecy

- Coat of arms
- Location of Vindecy
- Location within France Location within Bourgogne-Franche-Comté
- Coordinates: 46°21′13″N 4°00′39″E
- Country: France
- Region: Bourgogne-Franche-Comté
- Department: Saône-et-Loire
- Arrondissement: Charolles
- Canton: Paray-le-Monial

Government
  - Mayor (2021–2026): Didier Chapon
- Area^{1}: 16.56 km^{2} (6.39 sq mi)
- Elevation: 250 m (820 ft)
- Highest elevation: 264 m (866 ft)
- Lowest elevation: 233 m (764 ft)
- Population (2023): 244
  - Density: 14.7/km^{2} (38.2/sq mi)
- Time zone: UTC+01:00 (CET)
  - Summer (DST): UTC+02:00 (CEST)
- INSEE/Postal code: 71581 /71110
- ^{1} French Land Register data, which excludes lakes, ponds, glaciers > 1 km^{2} (0.386 sq mi or 247 acres) and river estuaries.

Vindecy is a commune in the Saône-et-Loire department in the region of Bourgogne-Franche-Comté in eastern France.

== See also ==
- Communes of the Saône-et-Loire department
