= Arifat =

- Commune
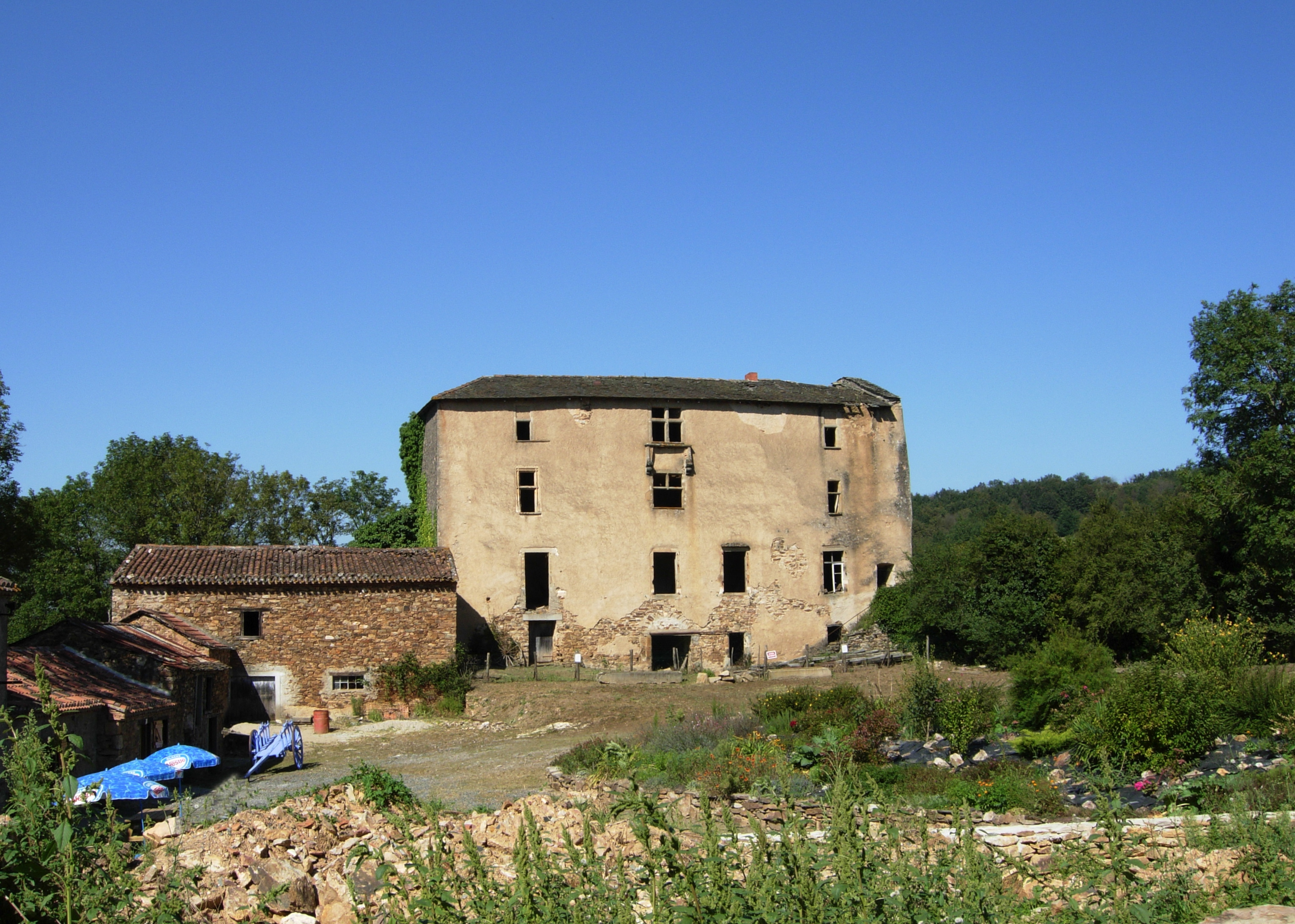
- The chateau in Arifat

- Coat of arms
- Location of Arifat
- Location within France Location within Occitanie
- Coordinates: 43°47′07″N 2°21′53″E
- Country: France
- Region: Occitania
- Department: Tarn
- Arrondissement: Castres
- Canton: Le Haut Dadou
- Intercommunality: CC Centre Tarn

Government
  - Mayor (2020–2026): Sylvian Cals
- Area^{1}: 20.28 km^{2} (7.83 sq mi)
- Elevation: 430 m (1,410 ft)
- Highest elevation: 583 m (1,913 ft)
- Lowest elevation: 267 m (876 ft)
- Population (2023): 128
  - Density: 6.31/km^{2} (16.3/sq mi)
- Time zone: UTC+01:00 (CET)
  - Summer (DST): UTC+02:00 (CEST)
- INSEE/Postal code: 81017 /81360
- ^{1} French Land Register data, which excludes lakes, ponds, glaciers > 1 km^{2} (0.386 sq mi or 247 acres) and river estuaries.

Arifat (French pronunciation: [aʁifa]; Occitan: Arifat) is a commune of the Tarn department in southern France.

== Geography ==
The commune is traversed by the river Dadou.

== Demographics ==
The inhabitants are known as Arifatois in French.

Historical population
Year	Pop.	±% p.a.
1968	215	—
1975	195	−1.39%
1982	201	+0.43%
1990	171	−2.00%
1999	158	−0.87%
2007	162	+0.31%
2012	148	−1.79%
2017	164	+2.07%
2023	128	−4.05%
Source: INSEE

== Places of interest ==
- Arifat's castle
- Waterfall

== See also ==
- Communes of the Tarn department
