= Heuchin =

Heuchin Helkijn
- Commune
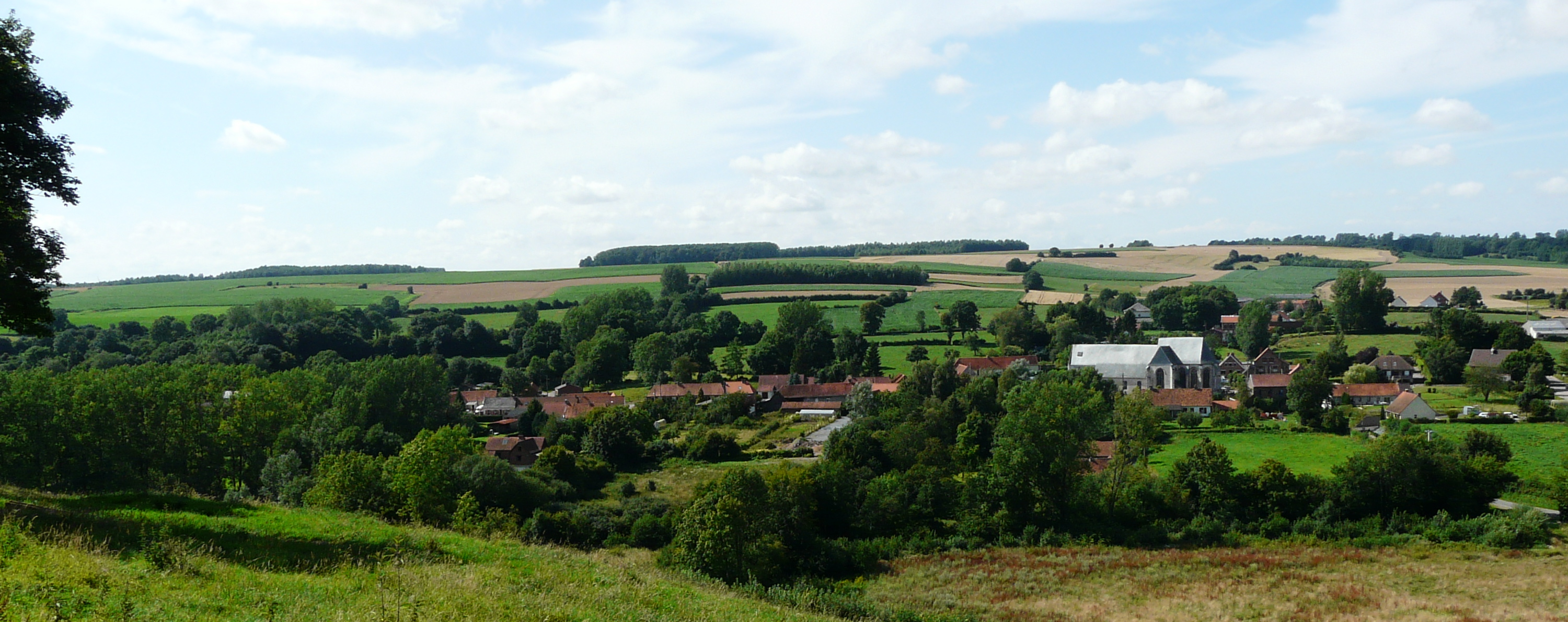
- A general view of Heuchin

- Coat of arms
- Location of Heuchin
- Location within France Location within Hauts-de-France
- Coordinates: 50°28′38″N 2°16′15″E
- Country: France
- Region: Hauts-de-France
- Department: Pas-de-Calais
- Arrondissement: Arras
- Canton: Saint-Pol-sur-Ternoise
- Intercommunality: CC Ternois

Government
  - Mayor (2022–2026): Angélique Perrin
- Area^{1}: 8.16 km^{2} (3.15 sq mi)
- Elevation: 83 m (272 ft)
- Highest elevation: 166 m (545 ft)
- Lowest elevation: 72 m (236 ft)
- Population (2023): 482
  - Density: 59.1/km^{2} (153/sq mi)
- Time zone: UTC+01:00 (CET)
  - Summer (DST): UTC+02:00 (CEST)
- INSEE/Postal code: 62451 /62134
- ^{1} French Land Register data, which excludes lakes, ponds, glaciers > 1 km^{2} (0.386 sq mi or 247 acres) and river estuaries.

Heuchin (French pronunciation: [øʃɛ̃]; West Flemish: Helkijn) is a commune in the Pas-de-Calais department in the Hauts-de-France region of France 32 miles (51 km) northwest of Arras, by the banks of the Faulx river.

== Population ==
Historical population
Year	Pop.	±% p.a.
1968	603	—
1975	584	−0.46%
1982	544	−1.01%
1990	514	−0.71%
1999	537	+0.49%
2007	541	+0.09%
2012	560	+0.69%
2017	529	−1.13%
2023	482	−1.54%
Source: INSEE

== See also ==
- Communes of the Pas-de-Calais department
