= Sains-Morainvillers =

- Commune
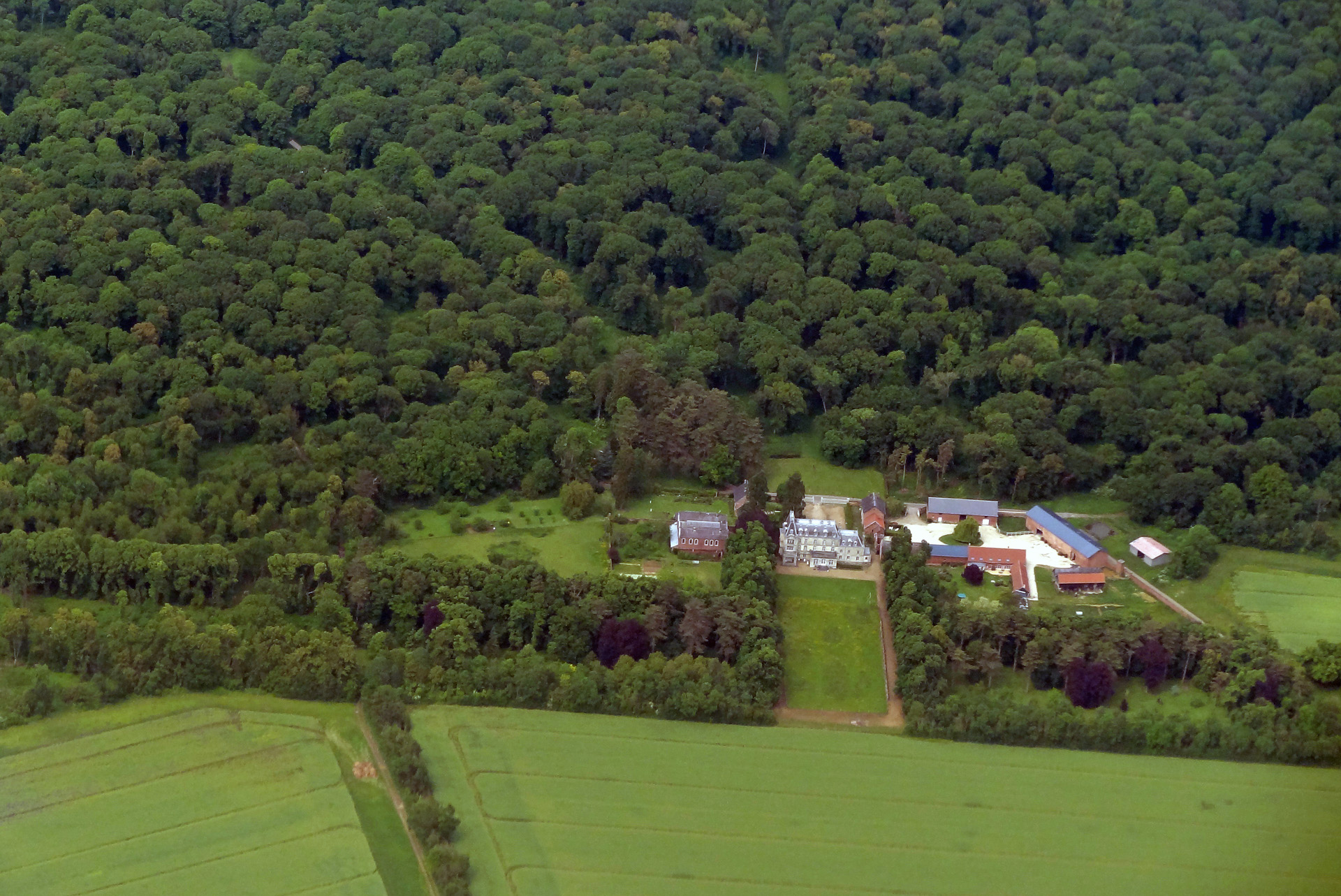
- An aerial view of the chateau in Sains-Morainvillers
- Location of Sains-Morainvillers
- Location within France Location within Hauts-de-France
- Coordinates: 49°34′27″N 2°28′17″E
- Country: France
- Region: Hauts-de-France
- Department: Oise
- Arrondissement: Clermont
- Canton: Estrées-Saint-Denis
- Intercommunality: Plateau Picard

Government
  - Mayor (2020–2026): Xavier Matte
- Area^{1}: 12.42 km^{2} (4.80 sq mi)
- Elevation: 116 m (381 ft)
- Highest elevation: 143 m (469 ft)
- Lowest elevation: 102 m (335 ft)
- Population (2023): 272
  - Density: 21.9/km^{2} (56.7/sq mi)
- Time zone: UTC+01:00 (CET)
  - Summer (DST): UTC+02:00 (CEST)
- INSEE/Postal code: 60564 /60420
- ^{1} French Land Register data, which excludes lakes, ponds, glaciers > 1 km^{2} (0.386 sq mi or 247 acres) and river estuaries.

Sains-Morainvillers (French pronunciation: [sɛ̃ mɔʁɛ̃vile]) is a commune in the Oise department in northern France.

== See also ==
- Communes of the Oise department
