= Château de Drée =

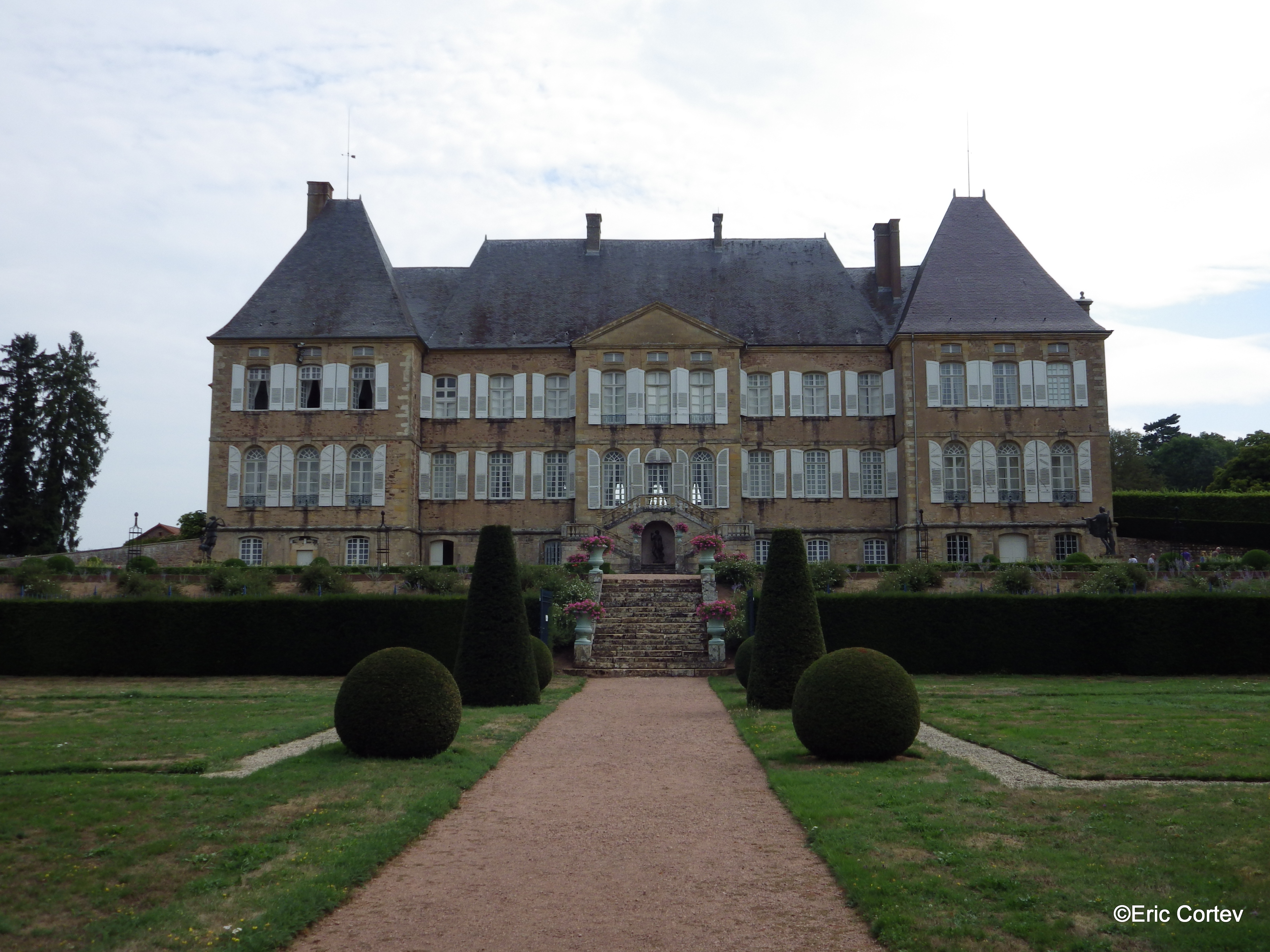
- Interactive map of the Château de Drée area

General information
- Type: château
- Location: Curbigny, France
- Coordinates: 46.3207°N 4.3084°E
- Completed: 17th century

The Château de Drée is a historic château in Curbigny, Saône-et-Loire, Bourgogne-Franche-Comté, France. It was built in the 17th century. It has been listed as an official historical monument by the French Ministry of Culture since 1959.
