= Parrott (surname) =

Parrott is a surname. Notable people with the surname include:

== Arts and entertainment ==
- Alice Kagawa Parrott (1929–2009), fiber artist and ceramicist
- Andrew Parrott (born 1947), British musicologist and conductor
- Carroll Parrott Blue (1943–2019), American film maker, author, professor
- Cecil Parrott (1909–1984), British diplomat, translator, writer and scholar
- Charles Joseph Parrott (1893–1940), birth name of Charley Chase, American comedian, actor, screenwriter and director
- Ian Parrott (1916–2012), British composer
- James Parrott (1897–1939), American comic actor and film director
- Jasper Parrott (born 1944), co-founder and executive chairman of HarrisonParrott Ltd., an artist management company
- Jeff Parrott, Dallas artist
- Nicki Parrott, Jazz vocalist and bass player from Australia
- Thomas Marc Parrott (1866–1960), Princeton professor, literary scholar
- Thomas H. Parrott (1836–1899), English musician
- Ursula Parrott (1899–1957), American writer of romantic fiction stories and novels

== Military ==
- Enoch Greenleafe Parrott (1814–1879), American naval officer
- George Parrott (1887–1918), American Navy officer in World War I
- Jacob Parrott (1843–1908), first recipient of the Medal of Honor for his military service in the American Civil War
- Robert Parker Parrott (1804–1877), inventor of the Parrott rifle

== Politics ==
- Edward Parrott (1863–1921), British teacher and author, Member of Parliament
- Eluned Parrott (born 1974), Welsh politician
- Harry Craig Parrott (1925–2019), Canadian politician
- Jim Parrott (1942–2016), Canadian politician
- Joanne S. Parrott (1940–2009), Maryland politician
- John Fabyan Parrott (1767–1836), American Senator from New Hampshire
- Marion A. Parrott (1918–2000), prominent North Carolinian
- Marcus Junius Parrott (1828–1879), Kansas congressman
- Matt Parrott (1837–1900), American politician and businessman
- Neil Parrott (born 1970), American politician from Maryland
- William Parrott (1843–1905), British coalminer, trade union official and Liberal-Labour politician

== Sport ==
- Buddy Parrott (born 1939), NASCAR crew chief
- David Parrott, English cricketer
- Jiggs Parrott (1871–1898), baseball player
- John Parrott (born 1964), English snooker player
- Kyle Parrott (born 1985), Canadian long track speed skater
- Mike Parrott (born 1954), baseball player
- Todd Parrott (born 1964), NASCAR racer
- Tom Parrott (1868–1932), professional baseball player
- Travis Parrott (born 1980), American professional tennis player
- Troy Parrott (born 2002), Irish professional footballer

== Other fields ==
- Alison Parrott (1974–1986), Canadian missing girl
- Big Nose George Parrott (1834–1881), American outlaw
- Delphine Parrott (1928–2016), British endocrinologist and immunologist
- Joseph R. Parrott (1859–1913), President of the Florida East Coast Railway
- Les Parrott (born 1961), author (Christian self-help books), psychologist, minister
- Louise Parrott Cochran (1903–1956), American social worker
- Thomas Alexander Parrott (1914–2007), CIA officer

== See also ==
- Parrot (surname)
