= Thomas Parrott =

Thomas Parrott may refer to:

- Thomas Alexander Parrott (1914–2007), American Central Intelligence Agency (CIA) officer
- Thomas H. Parrott (1836–1899), English musician
- Thomas Marc Parrott (1866–1960), American literary scholar
- Tom Parrott (Thomas William Parrott, 1868–1932), American baseball player
