= Piers Secunda =

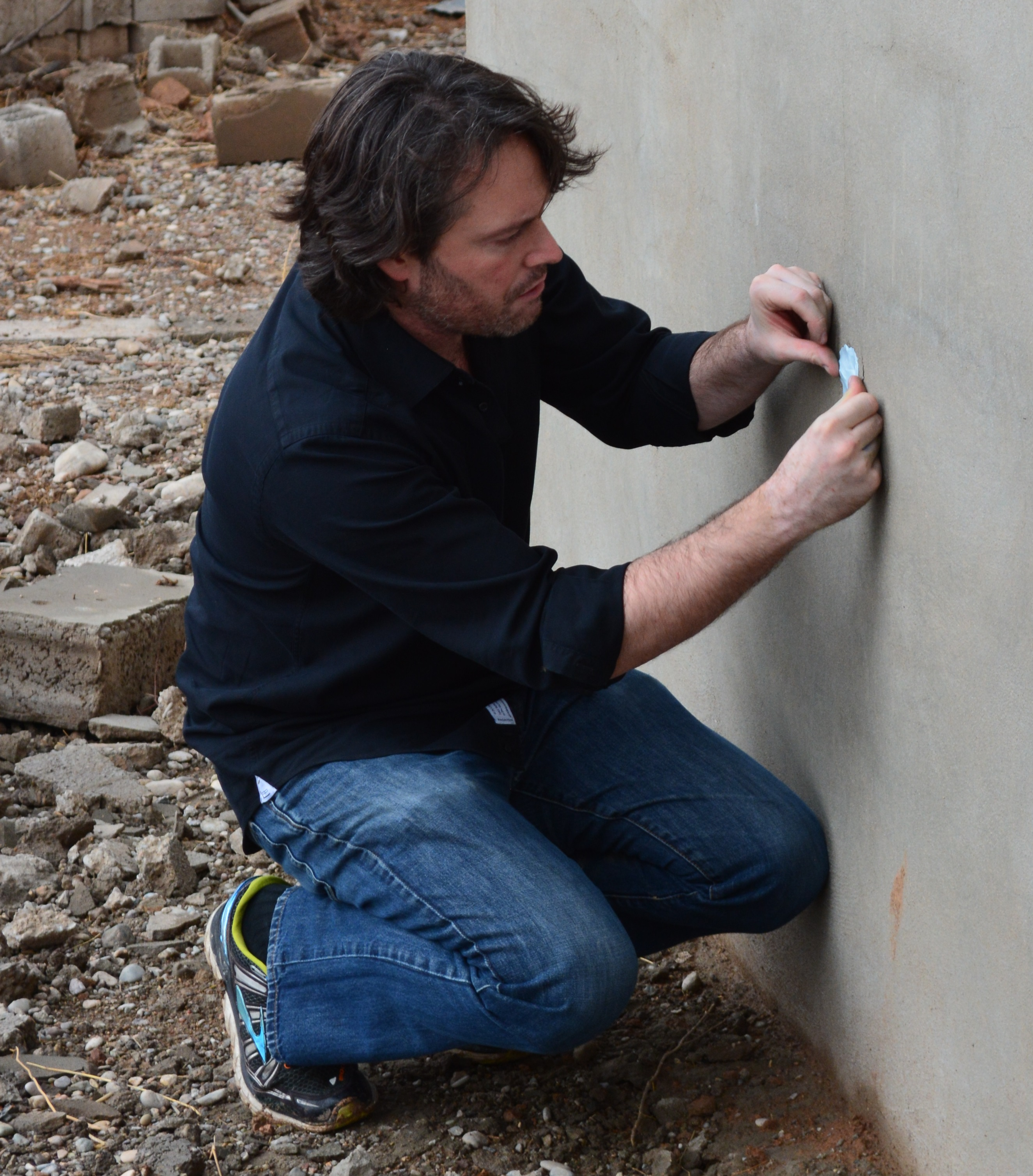
- Piers Secunda moulding ISIS damage in Tell Arabaa, a front line village in Iraq 2015
- Born: 1976 (age 49–50); London
- Education: Chelsea College of Arts
- Occupation: Artist

Piers Secunda (born 1976) is an English visual artist, best known for his sculpture and installation art.

== Biography ==
Secunda was born in 1976 in London, England. He studied painting at Chelsea College of Arts in London.

== Artistic career ==
Since the late 1990s Secunda has developed a studio practice using paint in a sculptural manner, rejecting the limitations imposed by the canvas. The systems he developed for making objects out of paint continues to be a key part of his painting practice, which started with abstract assemblages and suddenly political in 2001.

Whilst living in New York State in 2001, Secunda was intensely affected by seeing the destruction of the 3,000 year old Bamiyan Buddhas in Afghanistan, on the television news and six months later 9/11. Over the following weeks his work started to examine the deliberate destruction of culture. In the years that followed, geopolitics overwhelmed what had previously been an abstract painting practice, to become the primary focus of his work.

Over the past two decades, Secunda's studio practice has become increasingly research-oriented, examining subjects such as the history of energy and technology, as well as the deliberate destruction of culture.

=== Amazon Charcoal Ink Paintings, 2023 – ongoing ===
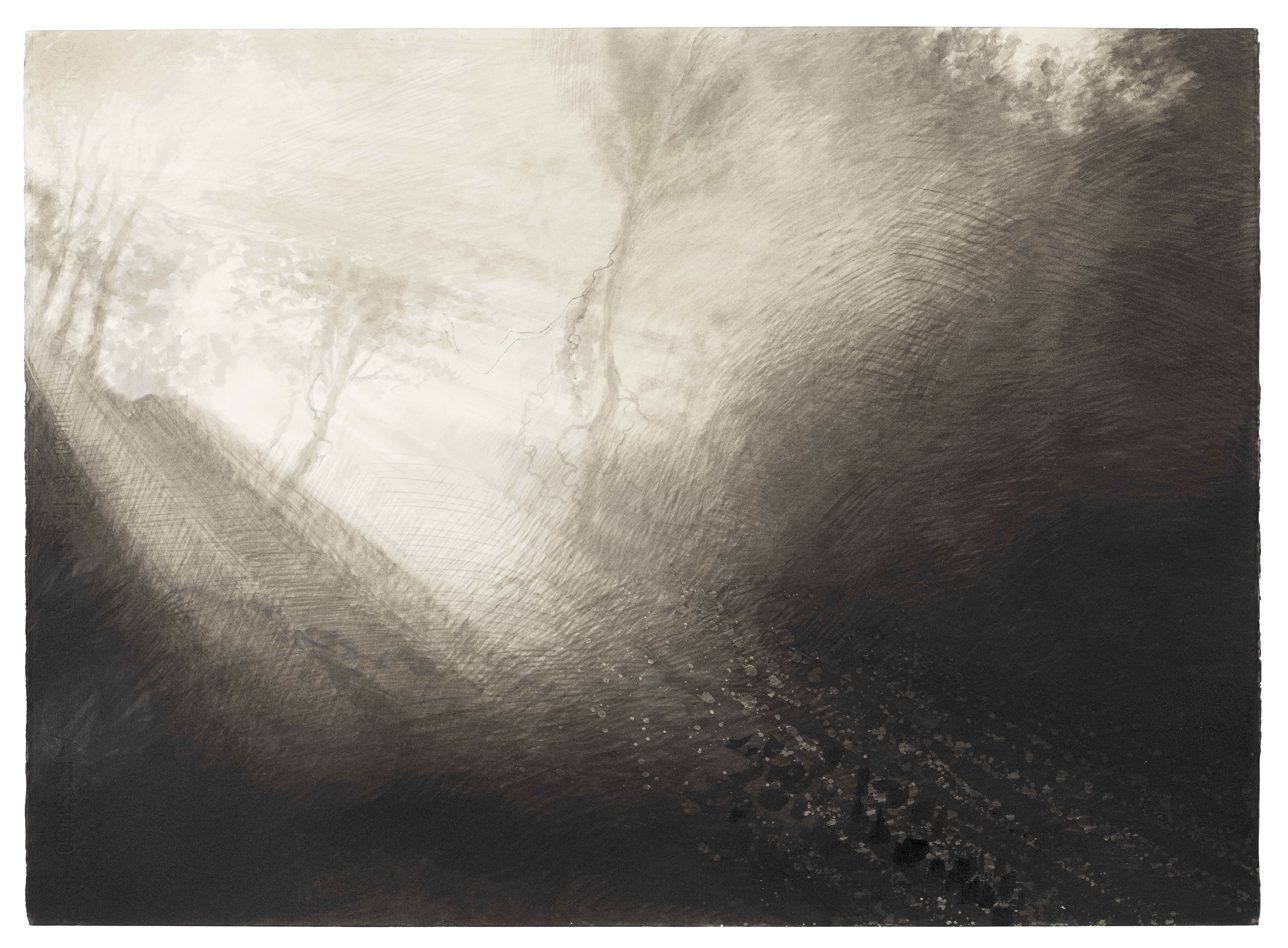
Smoke In The Jungle. 2023. Amazon charcoal ink on paper 56cm x 76.5cm

In 2023, Simon Butler, the director of British charity Migrate Art, travelled to the Amazon Rainforest where illegal fires were burning out of control. He shipped boxes of charcoal from burned areas of the Amazon, back to the UK. The charcoal was turned into ink and paints and distributed to 40 international artists, whose works made with the Amazon inks and paints were sold at Christie's in London, to raise money to provide the Xingu Indigenous Reserve with fire-fighting equipment. The works shown here have been painted with the Amazon ink.

=== No Me Olvides Por Espana, 2022 – ongoing ===
In 2022, Secunda met with forensic archaeologist Nicholas Marquez-Grant, whose specialization is the excavation of mass graves in Spain which returns the remains of “disappeared” people from the Franco era, to the relatives for formal burial. Following on these conversations, Secunda designed the enamelled “Nome Olvides Por Espana” memorial pin, using the motif of a cluster of Forget-Me-Not flowers. The pin is sold as a uniting symbol for the families whose relations disappeared during the Franco regime, to raise money for the ongoing exhumations carried out by forensic archaeology organisations Mapas De Memoria.

=== ISIS related works, 2015 – ongoing ===
In 2015 Secunda started visiting the Kurdish region of Iraq and to travel to recently liberated front line positions with the Peshmerga, to make moulds of ISIS damage to the ancient villages as they were liberated. The visit was not without danger: their presence in the village of Tell Arabaa was noticed in March 2015 and resulted in an ISIS mortar attack on their location. The work was shown in London and New York as part of The Missing: Rebuilding the Past exhibition.

At the September 2017 UNESCO General Meeting in Paris, at which the discussions revolved around the destruction of culture, Piers met Iraqi Culture Minister Fryad Rwandzi, who extended him an invitation to meet in Baghdad. In March 2018, Rwandzi provided Piers with a letter to allow him access to the recently liberated Mosul Museum, to mould the ISIS damage to the monumental Assyrian sculptures. Secunda also gathered charcoal from the partly burned out Mosul Museum, which was ground down into ink and used to make drawings and later a suite of 5 prints, in collaboration with London print publisher Atelier JI.

In 2020, the Ashmolean Museum commissioned the production of a large installation merging a 3D print of the Ashmolean Museums' own Assyrian Relief, with the Mosul Museum ISIS damage moulds. The installation was exhibited at the Ashmolean Museum in 2020, as part of the exhibition Owning the Past and subsequently toured the United States with the Yazidi advocacy exhibition Nobody's Listening.

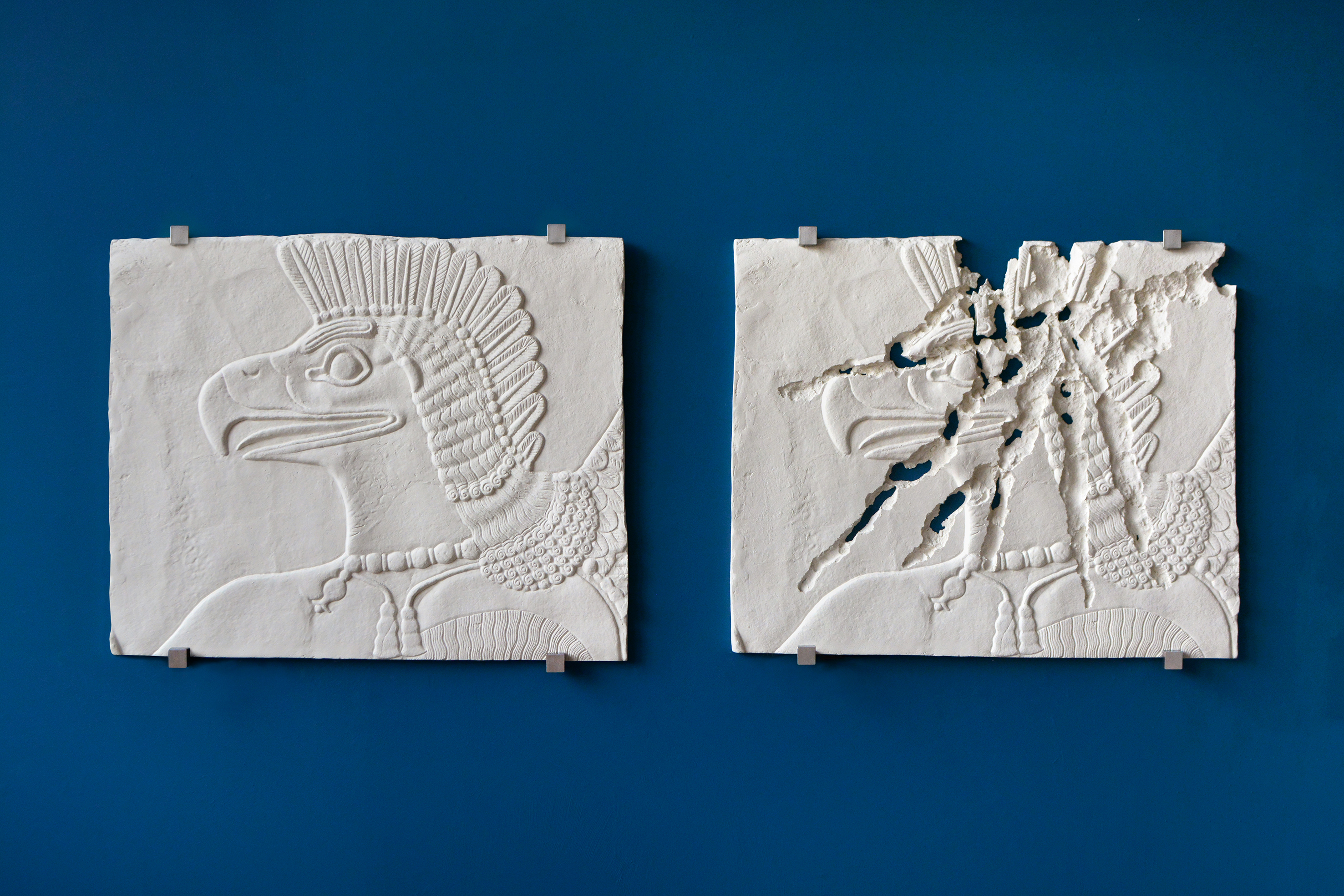
ISIS Damage Painting (Ashmolean Relief) 2021 Industrial floor paint 60 x 160 x 2cm On permanent display Ashmolean Museum Oxford

In 2021 the Ashmolean Museum commissioned Secunda to produce an ISIS-related work during the refurbishment of their Middle East room. The work merged a 3D print of the Ashmolean Museum's own Assyrian reliefs with moulded pneumatic drill marks from ISIS destroyed Assyrian sculptures in the Mosul Museum. The work is on permanent display in the Ashmolean Museum.

In October 2020, one of the Mosul Museum charcoal ink works was sold in the Christie's London Post-War and Contemporary Art auction.

During the Spring of 2022, four works on paper, made with ink produced from the charred remains of the partly ISIS burned Mosul Museum were acquired by the Mosul Cultural Museum. One work of the same type was acquired by the Iraq National Museum, Baghdad.

=== 9/11 related works, 2014 – ongoing ===
In 2014 Piers was given permission from both the director and head conservator of the 9/11 Memorial and Museum in New York city, to laser scan a section of World Trade Center steel box beam. The digitized section was elongated, 3D printed, cast in rubber and contorted into anthropomorphized human forms. These “Ghost Beam” sculptures merge the Pompeii plaster casts (of human shaped cavities in the Vesuvius ash) with the external steel structure of the Twin Towers.

Over the ten years following 9/11, sections of Twin Towers steel beams were distributed to Government buildings and Fire Stations around the United States, as memorials. The corten steel metal slowly sheds its rolled surface in the form of large rust flakes. Over a two years, Secunda collected the rust flakes which had fallen to the ground around one of the sections of World Trade Center steel, which had been donated to Verbank, New York, in the Union Vale Fire District which is on public view twenty minute's drive from the house which Secunda was living in 2001.

In 2020, Secunda commissioned photographers in Pakistan to go to the remains of the destroyed Bin Laden House, turn their backs on the foundations of the compound and photograph “interesting features in the landscape” around the house. One of the photographers returned with photographs of trees. The other returned with photographs of potatoes being dug up in the field adjoining the Bin Laden property. Secunda describes these 9/11 steel beam rust ink paintings as meditations on the passage of 20 years since September 11, 2001. An examination of the passing of the seasons, the renewal of nature and the journey of the steel from the World Trade Centre, back to the soil.

Three of the 9/11 steel beam rust ink paintings were included in the U.S. State Department's exhibition “And Yet We Rise, 20 Years Of Remembrance And Reflection Of September The 11th” held at the American Embassy in London.

=== Taliban related works, 2010–2020 ===
In August 2010, Secunda visited Afghanistan for the first time, to make moulds of Taliban bullet damage. The visit was encouraged and in part facilitated by Sardar Ahmad Khan, who had been an employee of Agence France Press and owner of the media agency Kabul Pressistan. Sardar mapped out locations of Taliban attacks in Kabul the prior year, where Secunda was able to speak to local people to understand what had happened, and mould the bullet damage. The subsequent ‘Taliban Bullet Hole Paintings’ were exhibited in the UK, Netherlands, Hong Kong, Australia, China, The United States. Phaidon Art book publishers described the works as “The most directly inspired works on the subject of the Afghanistan, that we have seen”. Sardar Ahmad Khan was killed along with his wife and two children in a Taliban attack on Kabul's Serena Hotel, in 2014, but until his death remained a strong advocate of Secunda' work in the intervening years.

=== Crude Oil Works, 2008 – ongoing ===
Seeking a paint which functions as a metaphor for human activity, Secunda started making silkscreen prints using crude oil in 2008. The works acknowledge that humanity is, “for better or worse”, in the midst of the “Petro-Chemical Age”, one of the "defining eras of humanity". “As the ultimate facilitator human activity and our greatest source of energy, I believe that crude oil must be a strong contender as the ultimate artist's material.” Secunda explained. “Using oils sourced from specific oil fields and countries, I am telling the story of the petro-chemical age.”

Elsewhere he said “If I live long enough, I will be able to see the end of the oil age, it will end, not for lack of oil but because something better comes along. I want to witness that.” The crude oil works portray scenes from 20th- and 21st-century life, some banal, some alarming, using crude oils from the places portrayed.
