= Parot =

Parot is a surname. Notable people with the surname include:

- Alfonso Parot (born 1989), Chilean footballer
- Carmen Luz Parot (born 1967), Chilean journalist and documentary filmmaker
- Catalina Parot (born 1956), Chilean lawyer and politician
- Henri Parot (born 1958), Spanish murderer
- Hubert Parot (1933–2015), French equestrian
- Jean-François Parot (born 1946), French diplomat and writer
- Samuel Parot (born 1964), Chilean equestrian

== See also ==
- Parot, Spanish television series
- Parot doctrine, Spanish legal doctrine
- Parrot (disambiguation)
