= Robin Richmond =

Robin Richmond may refer to:

- Robin Richmond (organist) (1912–1998), English cinema organist and BBC Radio presenter and performer
- Robin Richmond (artist) (born 1951), British-American painter, writer, critic, teacher and illustrator
