= The Trouble with Women =

The Trouble with Women may refer to:

- "The Trouble with Women" (Randall and Hopkirk Deceased), an episode of British detective series Randall and Hopkirk (Deceased)
- The Trouble with Women (film), a 1947 American comedy film
- The Trouble with Women - a book by cartoonist Jacky Fleming
