= Parrot (surname) =

Parrot is a surname. Notable people with the surname include:

- André Parrot (1901–1980), French archaeologist
- Carl Parrot (1867–1911), German physician and ornithologist
- Friedrich Parrot (1791–1841), Baltic German naturalist, explorer and mountaineer
- Georg Friedrich Parrot (1767–1852), Estonian scientist
- Henry Parrot (fl. 1600–1626), English epigrammatist
- Jean-Claude Parrot (born 1937), Canadian union leader
- Kent Kane Parrot (1880–1956), American politician
- Philippe Parrot (1831–1894), French painter
- William Parrot (1878–1952), birth name of English music hall performer who used the stage name Talbot O'Farrell

== See also ==
- Parrott (surname)
