= Parrott =

Parrott may refer to:

== People ==
- Parrott (surname)

== Places in the United States ==
- Parrott, Georgia, a city in the United States
- Parrott, Ohio, an unincorporated community
- Parrott, Virginia, an unincorporated community in Pulaski County, Virginia
- Parrott Hall, New York historical home
- Parrottsville, a small town in East Tennessee

== Military ==
- Parrott rifle, a type of artillery used in the American Civil War
- USS Parrott, a United States Navy destroyer which served in World War II
- USS Parrot (MSC-197), a United States Navy minesweeper

== See also ==
- Arendell Parrott Academy, a school in North Carolina
- Parrottsville, Tennessee, a town
- Parrot (disambiguation)
