= Leon Vilaincour =

Polish-born British painter (1923–2016)

- Born: 17 June 1923; Kraków, Poland
- Died: 8 February 2016; London
- Education: Central School of Art and Crafts, London
- Known for: Painter

Leon Vilaincour (born Leon Julius Pauker; 17 June 1923 – 8 February 2016) was a Polish-born British painter. Born in Kraków, he moved to the United Kingdom at the start of World War II and settled in London. He taught painting at the Chelsea School of Art in London, and the Central School of Art and Crafts (now known as Central St Martins), where he met his wife, the painter and wood carver, Roberta Cameron Smith.

His large oeuvre consists primarily of oil paintings and water colours. His stylistic development spans many decades with increasingly dramatic use of colour and abstract imagery. European culture and history play a large part in his work, for example there is extensive reference to the Napoleonic era and the early 20th Century. Recurring themes also include Viennese cafe culture, French music, and visual motifs such as screens of iridescent pearls. Two of his oil paintings are part of the Tate Collection

Four of his paintings are in the Arts Council collection. He exhibited at Royal Academy Summer Exhibitions in the 1970s, and his works have been represented in several other exhibitions over the years, including at the 13th John Moores Exhibition, Walker Art Gallery, Liverpool, where he was a prize-winner.

== Awards ==
- Arts Council Major Award in 1977
- Lorne Award in 1981

== Major Shows ==
- 1964: New Art Centre, Sloane Street, London
- 1982: Knoedler Kasmin Gallery, Cork Street, London
- 1983: Serpentine Gallery, London, Arts Council of Great Britain
- 1992: Rye Art Gallery, East Sussex
