= Rupert Norfolk =

British artist

Rupert Norfolk (UK) is an artist based in London. His work is mainly sculptural and investigates the perceptual and conceptual possibilities of concrete and depicted things. Norfolk uses a wide range of processes, such as drawing, Tapestry weaving, stone carving, airbrushing, casting and computer aided technologies.

== Education ==
He received his BA from Chelsea School of Art and Design in 1996.

== Selected exhibitions ==
| 2015 | Museum of Stones, Noguchi Museum, Long Island City, US* Drawing Biennial 2015, The Drawing Room, London, UK |
| 2014 | The Crime Was Almost Perfect, curated by Cristina Ricupero, Witte de With Centre for Contemporary Art, Rotterdam, NL* Annals of the 29th Century, curated by Gareth Bell-Jones, Wysing Arts Centre, Cambridge UK The Drawing Show, AIR, Pittsburgh, US |
| 2013 | systems, curated by das programm, Walter Knoll, London, UK Novecento mai visto, Museo di Santa Giulia, Brescia, IT IMAGE/OBJECT, Furini Contemporary, Rome, IT Andratx on Paper, curated by Patricia Asbaek, CCA Kunsthalle, Andratx, Mallorca, ES Drawing Biennial 2013, The Drawing Room, London, UK |
| 2012 | The Curator's Egg, Altera Pars, Anthony Reynolds Gallery, London, UK Landscapes Cities People, Netwerk/Center for Contemporary Art, Aalst, BE |
| 2011 | Painting Show, curated by Sophie von Hellermann & Gavin Wade, Eastside Projects, Birmingham, UK Secret Societies, curated by Cristina Ricupero and Alexis Vaillant, CAPC – Museum of Contemporary Art, Bordeaux, FR* Lustwarande 2011, curated by Chris Driessen, Fundament Foundation, Park de Oude Warande, Tilburg, NL* Secret Societies, curated by Cristina Ricupero and Alexis Vaillant, Schirn Kunsthalle, Frankfurt, DE Space Oddity, curated by Friederike Nymphius, CCA Kunsthalle, Andratx, Mallorca, ES In – and Outside – Writing, Voorkamer, Lier, BE* Drawing Biennial 2011, The Drawing Room, London, UK |
| 2010 | Big Minis, curated by Alexis Vaillant, CAPC – Museum of Contemporary Art, Bordeaux, FR* Minimalism and Applied II, Daimler Contemporary, Berlin, DE* Boom, Hotel, London, UK Newspeak: British Art Now – Part 1, Saatchi Gallery London, UK* Altogether Elsewhere, curated by Rob Tufnell, Rodeo Gallery, Istanbul, TR Library of Babel / In and Out of Place,176 / Zabludowicz Collection, London, UK* |
| 2009 | May/June, Stella Lohaus, Antwerp, BEDrawing Sculpture, Daimler Contemporary, Berlin, DE Drawing Biennial 2009, The Drawing Room, London, UK |
| 2008 | M25 Around London, curated by Barry Schwabsky, CCA Kunsthalle, Andratx, Mallorca, ES Novel, Anne-Catharina Gebbers Bibliothekswonhning, Berlin, DE Featuring, Chez Valentin, Paris, FR Henry Coleman & Rupert Norfolk, curated by Charlotte Moth, Balice Hertling, Paris, FR Los Vinilos, Royal Academy of Arts, Burlington Gardens, London, UK |
| 2007 | Abstraction: Extracting from the World, curated by David Thorp, Millennium Galleries, Sheffield, UK* Counterfacture: William Daniels, David Musgrave, Rupert Norfolk, Alex Pollard, curated by Marc Foxx, Luhring Augustine Gallery, New York City* George Longly, Rupert Norfolk, Galerie Chez Valentin, Paris, FR |
| 2006 | Rockridge, The Embassy Gallery, Edinburgh, UK Crivelli's Nail, Chapter Gallery, Cardiff, UK |
| 2005 | Les Merveilles du Monde, curated by Peter Fillingham, Musee des Beaux Arts de Dunkerque, France, FR* Waste Material, curated by David Musgrave, The Drawing Room, London, UK* Doubtful Works and Copies: Alasdair Gray, Rupert Norfolk, Jane Topping, Transmission, Glasgow, UK |
| 2004 | Living Dust, curated by David Musgrave, Norwich Gallery, Norwich School of Art and Design, UK* |
| 2002 | Exchange, Richard Salmon Gallery, London UK Like Beads on an Abacus Designed to Calculate Infinity, curated by Andrew Hunt, Rockwell, London, UK |
| 2001 | Animations, PS1, New York City, touring to Kunstwerke, Berlin, DE |
| 2000 | Light Industrial Magic, Platform, London, UK Medium-Sized Objects, curated by David Musgrave, One in the Other, London, UK |
| 1999 | Father Apollinaris Said…, Vilma Gold, London, UK Heart and Soul, Long Lane Studios, London, UK |
