= Nancy Horrocks =

British artist

- Born: Nancy Kitchin; 1900; Compton, Hampshire, England
- Died: 1989 (aged 88–89); Cranleigh, Surrey, England
- Education: Chelsea School of Art; Slade School of Fine Art
- Known for: Abstract painting
- Spouse: Brian Horrocks

Nancy Horrocks née Kitchin (1900–1989) was a British artist, notable for the abstract paintings she created in the 1960s.

== Biography ==
Horrocks was born at Compton in Hampshire and attended Winchester High School. She went on to study at the Chelsea School of Art and then the Slade School of Fine Art from 1918 to 1920.

Horrocks frequently exhibited her abstract paintings with the Women's International Art Club between 1958 and 1965. She took part in exhibitions at both the New Vision Centre Gallery and the Knott Gallery in Dallas during 1961 and at the Grabowski Gallery the following year. Horrocks also exhibited with the Artists' International Association and at Heal's Mansard Gallery during the mid-1960s, when she also had a solo exhibition at the New Gallery in Belfast. She also showed works at the Grosvenor Galleries and at the Bradford and Northampton City Art Galleries.

Horrocks was married to Lieutenant-General Sir Brian Horrocks and, at different periods, lived at St Ives, then London and at Singleton in West Sussex, before moving to a nursing home at Cranleigh.
