= Anthony Rossiter =

British painter

Anthony Rossiter RWA MSIAD was a British landscape painter who was educated at Eton and studied painting at Chelsea Art School from 1947-51. He was a romantic visionary, a “poet” whose particular heaven was the Mendip Hills in Somerset. Gnarled hedgerows, tumbling stone walls, broken gates, reflections in water and ploughed fields were all his subject matter. His works also included portraits, most notably that of W.H.Auden.

His painting initially had the lyrical qualities of John Nash and the Realist painters of the 1950s and 1960s. As he matured, it became a vigorous expressionist style.

His work can be seen in various public collections in the UK and USA, including, amongst others, The Victoria and Albert Museum London, The Ashmolean Oxford, The Government Art Collection, London Transport, The General Post Office, The Robert Frost collection, and is also held by many private collectors.
