= Chelsea College of Arts =

University college in London, England

Coordinates: 51.49039°N 0.12892°W

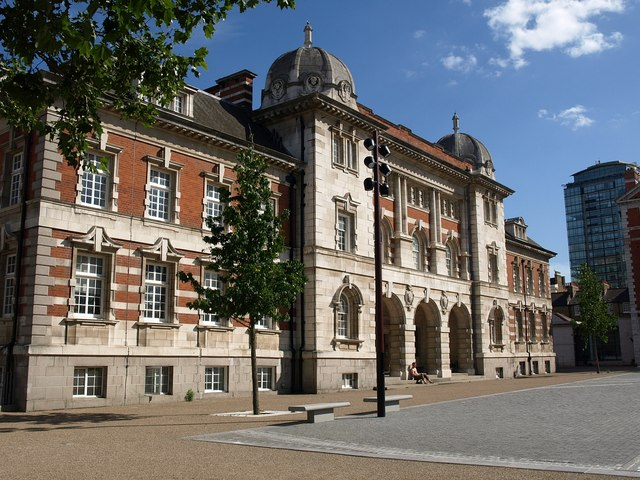
- Established: 1895 – South-Western Polytechnic; 1908 – Chelsea School of Art; 1989 – Chelsea College of Art and Design; 2013 – Chelsea College of Arts
- Affiliations: University of the Arts London
- Location: London, United Kingdom
- Campus: Millbank
- Website: arts.ac.uk/chelsea
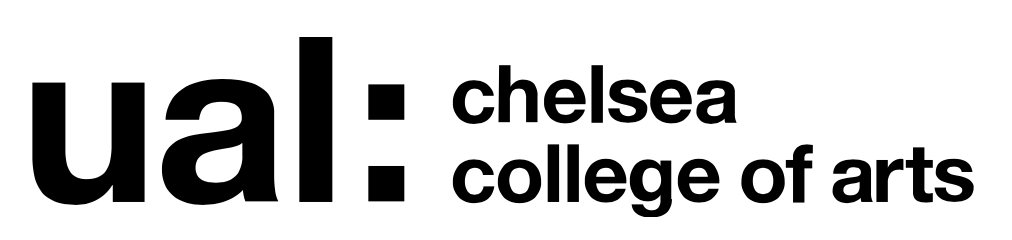

Chelsea College of Arts is a constituent college of the University of the Arts London, a public art and design university in London, England.

It offers further and higher education courses in fine art, graphic design, interior design, product design, and textile design up to PhD level.

== History ==
=== Polytechnic ===
Chelsea College of Arts was originally an integral school of the South-Western Polytechnic, which opened at Manresa Road, Chelsea, in 1895 to provide scientific and technical education to Londoners. Day and evening classes for men and women were held for the domestic economy, mathematics, engineering, natural science, art, and music. Art was taught from the beginning of the Polytechnic and included design, weaving, embroidery, and electrodeposition. The South-Western Polytechnic became the Chelsea Polytechnic in 1922 and taught a growing number of registered students at the University of London.

At the beginning of the 1930s, the School of Art began to widen, including courses in craft training and commercial design from 1931. H.S Williamson, the school's appointed headmaster from 1930 to 1958, introduced sculpture shortly after World War II. Notable artists from this period were employed as teachers such as Henry Moore and Graham Sutherland. Alumni from this period included Elisabeth Frink, Edward Burra, Patrick Caulfield, Ethel Walker, Dirk Bogarde, Robert Clatworthy, John Latham, and John Berger.

The School of Science separated and became known as the Chelsea College of Science and Technology in 1957, and was later admitted as a constituent College of the University of London in 1966. The Chelsea College of Science and Technology was granted its royal charter in 1971 and merged with King's College London and Queen Elizabeth College in 1985.

=== Chelsea School of Art ===
The School of Art merged with the Hammersmith School of Art, founded by Francis Hawke, to form the Chelsea School of Art in 1908. The newly formed school was taken over by the London County Council and a new building was erected at Lime Grove, which opened with an extended curriculum. A trade school for girls was erected on the same site in 1914.

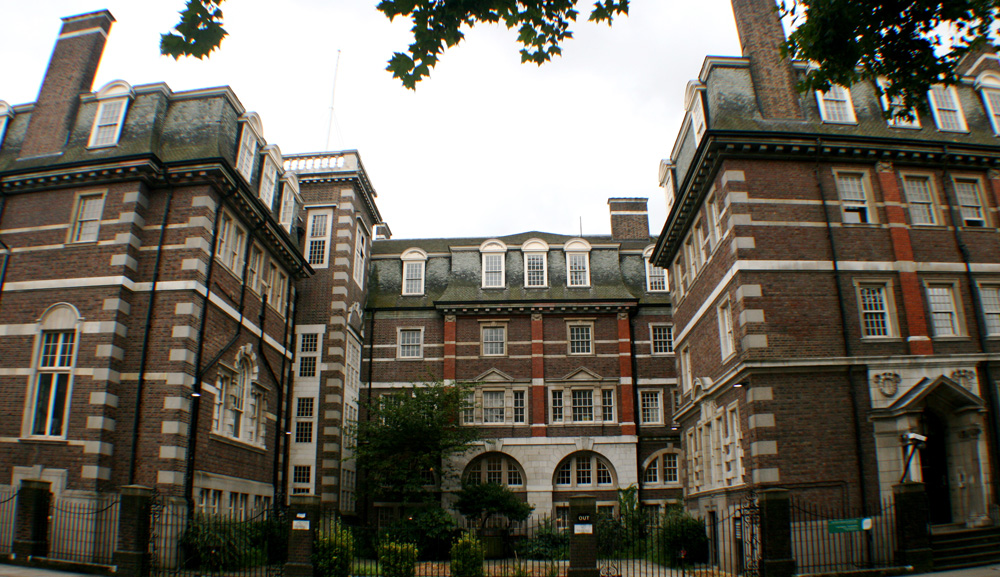
Chelsea College of Art and Design (South Block)

The school acquired premises at Great Titchfield Street, and was jointly accommodated with Quintin Hogg's Polytechnic in Regent Street (a forerunner of the University of Westminster). The campus at Manresa Road introduced painting and graphic design in 1963, with both disciplines being particularly successful.

Lawrence Gowing, painter and art historian, was appointed as the first principal of the Chelsea School of Art. He was responsible for the integration of history and theory with practice, employing artists rather than art historians to teach art history and theory. This approach remains intrinsic to Chelsea's teaching philosophy today.

Under Gowing, an option program was introduced, which encompassed workshops in experimental music, poetry, psychoanalysis, philosophy, and anthropology. A basic design course, pioneered by Victor Pasmore and Richard Hamilton, was also developed during the same period, becoming the basis of the college's current foundation course in art and design.

Professor William Callaway (Head of the School from 1989 to 1992), Colin Cina (appointed Dean of School of Art), and Bridget Jackson (Dean of the School of Design) reformed the school and ensured the redevelopment of the entire academic program, introducing courses at multiple levels from HND to accredited honors and postgraduate degrees. Initially, these were validated by the UK Council for National Academic Awards; i.e. in the short period before the London Institute gained degree-awarding powers. Bridget Jackson was appointed Head of the College in 1993, retiring in 1997 to be succeeded by Professor Colin Cina who led the college until his retirement in 2003.

=== London Institute ===
The Chelsea School of Art became a constituent College of the London Institute in 1986, formed by the Inner London Education Authority to associate London's art, design, fashion, and media schools into a collegiate structure. The school was renamed Chelsea College of Art and Design in 1989. The London Institute was granted University status and was renamed University of the Arts London in 2004. In 2013, the college was renamed Chelsea College of Arts.

In 2002–2003, Professor Roger Wilson was appointed as the Head of College until his retirement in 2006. He led the relocation to the listed Royal Army Medical College, renovated as a purpose-built art college by the architects Allies and Morrison in 2005. With this move, the Chelsea College of Arts presently resides next to Tate Britain at Millbank, returning to one standalone campus.

== Exhibition spaces ==
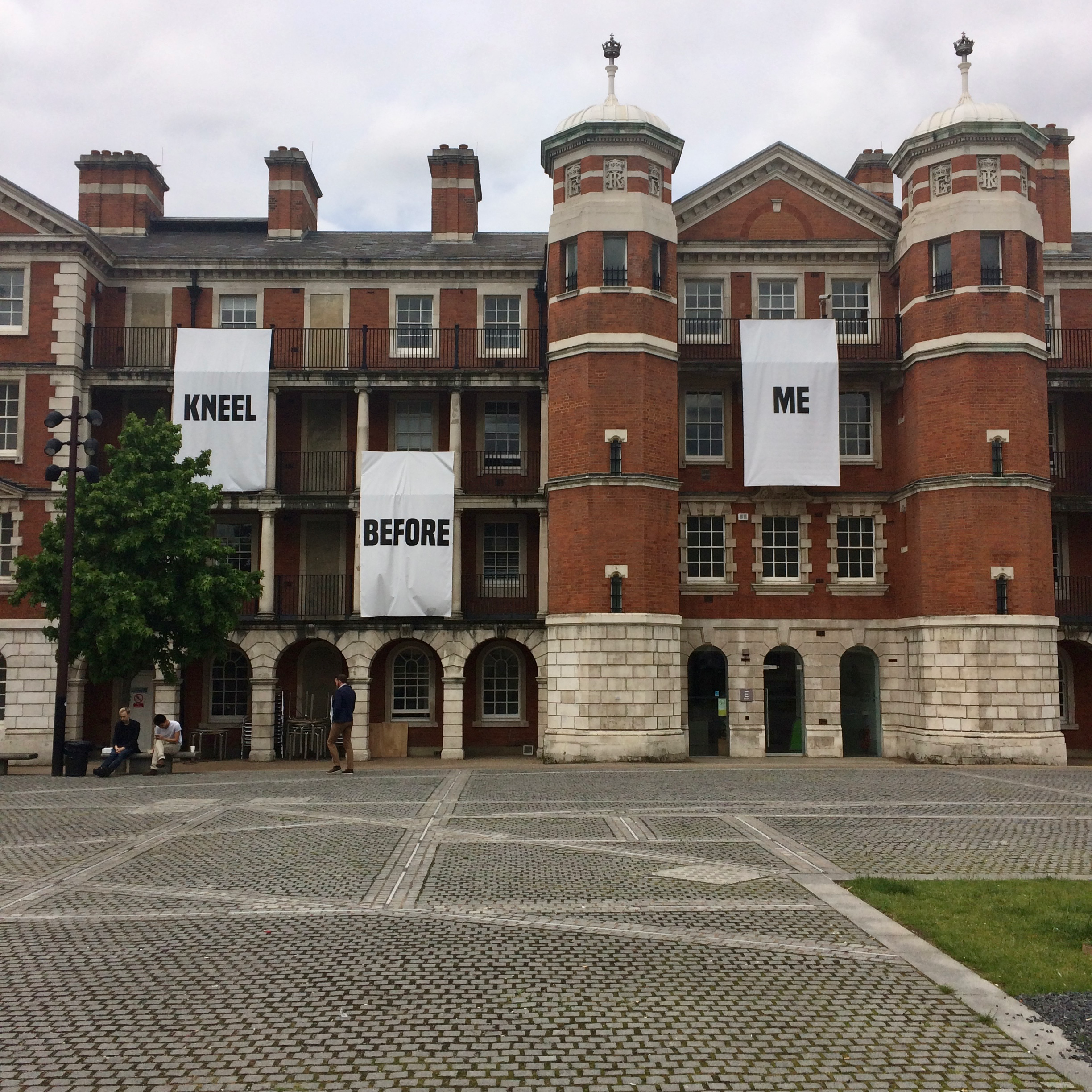
Sarah Smith's 'I Kissed the Blood on Those Soles of Yours' visible from The Parade Ground

The college comprises three notable on-site exhibition spaces:

1. Chelsea Space is an international and interdisciplinary platform for professional practitioners to exhibit experimental curatorial projects. The gallery also releases regular publications from participating authors, artists, and designers.
2. The Parade Ground, situated within the college, has been transformed into London's largest open-air gallery hosting events from film screenings to large-scale installations in the spring of 2008. The exhibition ground had previously been used for students and professionals as an open area platform, notably for artist Chris Burden's 'A Flying Steamroller' in 2006. Recent exhibitions include Cildo Meireles's 'Occasion', held in association with his exhibition at Tate Modern in 2008.
3. The Triangle Space, about its name, has been designed as a modern angular-shaped space for students to show their work throughout the year.

== Research ==
The college organises its research activities in partnership with Camberwell College of Arts and Wimbledon College of Arts hosts a variety of research centres, groups and clusters:

1. International Centre for Fine Art Research (ICFAR)
2. Transnational Art, Identity and Nation (TrAIN)
3. Critical Practice Chelsea
4. FADE (Fine Art Digital Environment)
5. Textiles, Environment, Design (TED)

== Affiliations ==
Chelsea is a constituent college of the University of the Arts London, with Camberwell College of Arts, Central Saint Martins, London College of Communication, London College of Fashion and Wimbledon College of Arts. The college also has exchange links with the Fashion Institute of Technology in New York City, US.

== Other ==
=== CLIP CETL ===
Chelsea and the London College of Fashion share the 'Creative Learning in Practice Centre for Excellence in Teaching and Learning' (CLIP CETL). The centre is funded by the British government in recognition of the two colleges' excellent results in developing student learning.

== Notable alumni ==
- Valerie Adler (painter)
- Anthea Alley (sculptor)
- Rita Angus (painter)
- Franko B (artist)
- Gwen Barnard (painter, printmaker)
- Celia Frances Bedford (painter, printmaker)
- John Berger (art critic, novelist, painter and author)
- Quentin Blake (children's illustrator)
- Flavia Blois (painter)
- Delphine Boël, (papier-mâché sculptor)
- Dirk Bogarde (actor and author)
- Frank Bowling (painter and sculptor)
- Irene Mary Browne (sculptor, potter)
- Kathleen Browne (painter)
- Edward Burra (painter, draughtsman and printmaker)
- Stephen J. Bury (author, art critic, curator and librarian)
- Margaret Calvert (designer)
- Jane Campion (film director and 2022 Academy Awards winner)
- Seth Cardew (Studio potter)
- Anthony Caro (abstract sculptor)
- Leonora Carrington (painter)
- Patrick Caulfield (painter and printmaker)
- Helen Chadwick (1987 Turner Prize nominee)
- Georgina Chapman (actress, model and designer)
- Alex Chinneck (artist)
- Alexa Chung (model, presenter)
- Robert Clatworthy (sculptor)
- Michal Cole (artist)
- Andrew Collins (broadcaster and journalist)
- Keith Coventry (painter, sculptor, curator)
- John Craxton (Neo-Romantic artist)
- Michael Cummings (cartoonist)
- Richard Deacon (sculptor, 1987 Turner Prize winner)
- Andy Denzler (painter)
- Tom Dixon (industrial designer)
- Mary Dobson (painter, illustrator)
- Peter Doig (painter)
- Mojeb al-Dousari (Kuwaiti artist)
- Guy Hendrix Dyas (designer)
- Cathie Felstead (illustrator)
- Nicholas Ferguson (television director and artist)
- Ralph Fiennes (actor)
- Rose Finn-Kelcey (artist)
- Jacky Fleming (cartoonist)
- Emily Forbes (entrepreneur)
- Laura Ford (sculptor)
- Elisabeth Frink (sculptor and printmaker)
- Nick Gammon (artist)
- May Gibbs (artist cartoonist illustrator author)
- Grace Golden (painter)
- Flavia Irwin (artist)
- Nicky Hoberman (painter)
- David Hockney (artist)
- Bob Holmes (artist and designer)
- Nancy Horrocks (painter)
- Tom Jenkinson (musician)
- Vivien John (painter)
- Anish Kapoor (1991 Turner Prize winner)
- Danica Karađorđević (graphic designer, Hereditary Princess of Serbia and Yugoslavia)
- Banke Kuku
- John Latham (conceptual artist)
- Elizabeth Jane Lloyd (painter, teacher)
- Maria Marshall (artist)
- Ryuson Chuzo Matsuyama (painter)
- Paul McDowell (vocalist with The Temperance Seven, actor)
- Ian McKay (writer)
- Steve McQueen (1999 Turner Prize winner, Academy Award-winning director, producer, screenwriter)
- Haroon Mirza (artist)
- Otonella Mocellin (artist)
- Christopher Monger (writer, film director)
- Nicholas Monro (pop art sculptor; also returned as a teacher at Chelsea)
- Mariko Mori (artist)
- Jill Mulleady (painter)
- David Nash (sculptor)
- Paul Nash (war artist)
- Mike Nelson (2001 and 2007 Turner Prize nominee)
- Karen Newman (sculptor)
- Lucia Nogueira (artist)
- Rupert Norfolk (sculptor)
- Diarmuid Byron O'Connor (sculptor and art director)
- Chris Ofili (1998 Turner Prize winner)
- John O'Neill (video game designer)
- Sini Pelkki (Artist)
- Alex Randall (lighting designer)
- Nick Raynsford (Member of Parliament)
- James Richards (2014 Turner Prize nominee)
- Alan Rickman (actor)
- Robin Richmond (artist and author)
- Barbara Robb (campaigner)
- Trevor Robinson (creative director)
- Anthony Rossiter (artist)
- Jani Ruscica (Artist)
- Andrew Sabin (artist, sculptor)
- Alexei Sayle (comedian and actor)
- Piers Secunda (artist)
- Conrad Shawcross (artist)
- Clare Shenstone (portrait painter)
- Jake Tilson (artist)
- Winston Tong (ceramics)
- Suzanne Treister (artist)
- Gavin Turk (artist)
- Etso Ugbodaga-Ngu (artist and the first Nigerian woman professor at Ahmadu Bello University)
- Rosemary Vercoe (costume designer)
- Ethel Walker (painter)
- Mark Wallinger (2007 Turner Prize winner)
- Rebecca Warren (2006 Turner Prize nominee)
- Richard Wathen (painter)
- Gillian Wearing (1997 Turner Prize winner)
- Chris Welsby (experimental filmmaker)
- Claudia Williams (painter)
- Fred Williams (Australian painter)
- Emily Young (stone sculptor)
- Ossip Zadkine (artist, sculptor)

== Notable staff ==
- Robert Buhler (1916–1989)
- Leon Vilaincour (1923-2016)
