= Bob Holmes (artist) =

British artist

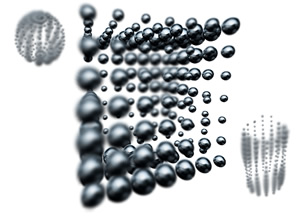
Uncuttable (Flash Interaction), e.space, 2007, San Francisco Fisher Collection

Bob Holmes (born 1963 in Greenock, Scotland) is a British digital artist.

He is an alumnus of Dundee Art College and studied Printmaking at Chelsea School of Art in the late 80's under Tim Mara (alumni include Dirk Bogarde, Actor and Author, Patrick Caulfield, Painter and Printmaker, and Anish Kapoor, 1991 Turner Prize winner.

In collaboration with James Widegren, he conceived of May Reboot, an international unified reinvigoration of the World Wide Web that occurs yearly on 1 May at 2 pm GMT.

His work is often generated, composed, or constructed in an algorithmic manner through the use of systems defined by computer software protocols, or similar mathematical or mechanical or randomised autonomous processes: using computer code as a medium for artistic expression. His interactive piece "Cloud" is one of three permanent art installations at USRA Earth System Science Program. Cloud consists of an array of blue and transparent squares that rotate and interact in relation to the visitor's proximity and motion. "This is an attempt to evoke the relationship between the three states of matter: solid, liquid and gas".
