= Nicky Hoberman =

South African painter

- Born: 1967 (age 58–59); Cape Town
- Education: Parsons School of Design Chelsea College of Art and Design
- Alma mater: Worcester College of Oxford University
- Occupations: Art historian, painter

Nicky Hoberman (born 1967) is a South African-born, London-based fine artist/painter whose style includes the use of expressionism combined with emotions, and illogical figures on a background of flat, even spaces.

== Early life and education ==
Nicky Hoberman was born in Cape Town, South Africa in 1967. She attended Worcester College of Oxford University from 1986 to 1989, where she received an MA in Modern History. From 1989 to 1993 she went to the Parsons School of Design in Paris and received a BA in Fine Art. In 1992 Hoberman attended the Yale Summer School of Art in the USA, and received an MA in Painting from the Chelsea College of Art and Design in London, where she attended from 1994 to 1995.

== Career and honors ==
In 1996 Hoberman was selected for the 1996 New Contemporaries at the Tate Liverpool. She was also included in Saatchi’s "New Neurotic Realism" exhibition in 1998. She has had solo exhibitions at Feigen Contemporary in New York and the Entwistle Gallery in London.

== Bibliography ==
- Mick Finch, Stuart Morgan, Nicky Hoberman, Entwistle, London, 1998.
- Susan Hitch, Gianni Romano, Nicky Hoberman, Gabrius, Milan, 2002.
- Nicky Hoberman, Hiromi Suzuki, Art Out of the Box: Creativity Games for Artists of all Ages, Lawrence King, London, 2019.
