= Robin Richmond (artist) =

British-American writer, painter, teacher and illustrator

Robin Richmond RWS
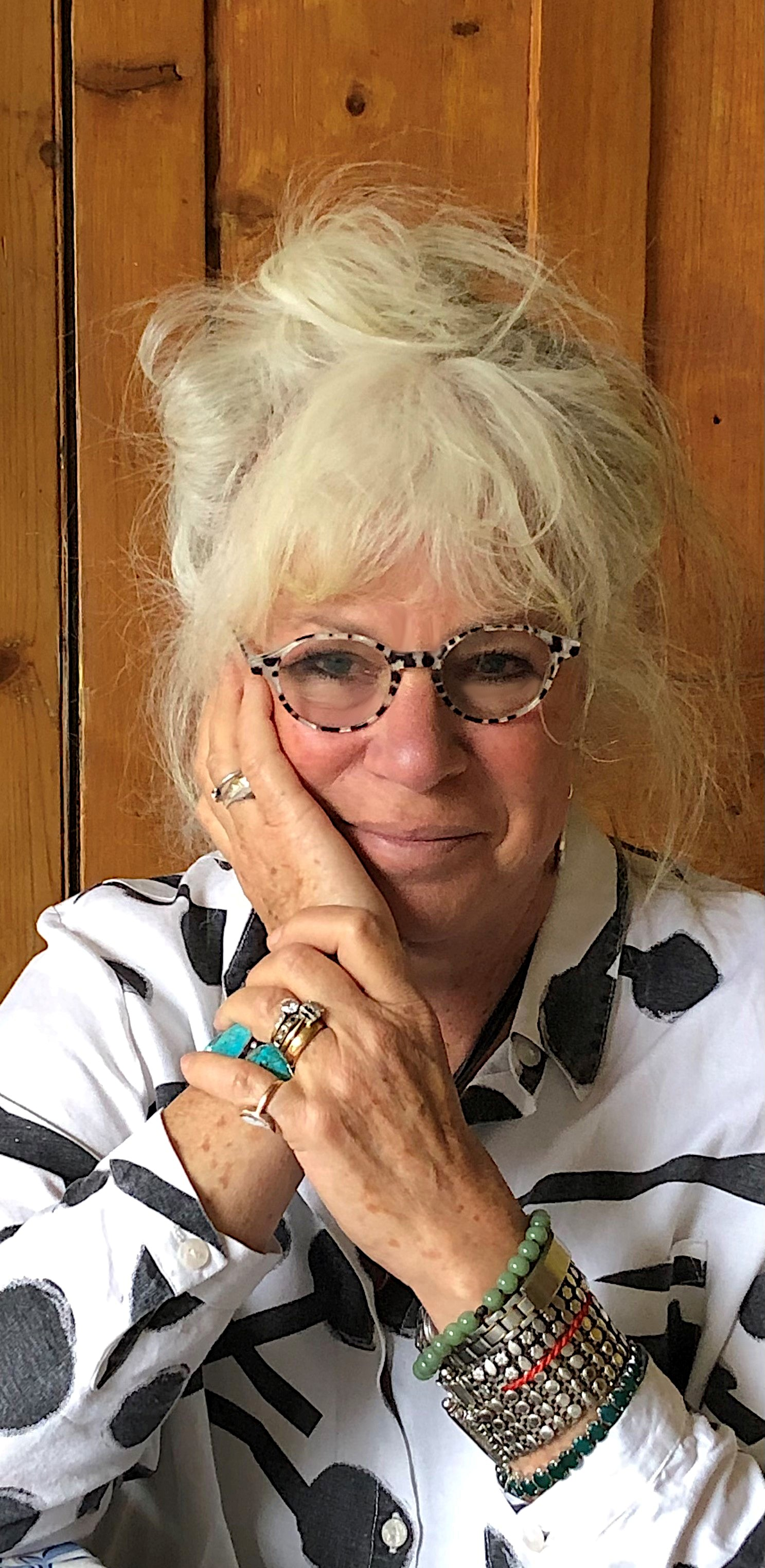
- Born: 1951 (age 74–75); Philadelphia USA
- Education: St George’s English School, Rome.
- Alma mater: Chelsea School of Art
- Known for: Painting, Writing about art, Illustration, Teaching
- Spouse: James Hampton
- Children: Adam Hampton (b.1977); Max Richmond Hampton; (b.1981, d.1981); Saskia Hampton (b.1982)

Robin Richmond RWS is a London-based British-American painter, writer, critic, teacher and illustrator, regularly exhibiting her art in the UK and France. She is the author of five books on art and has illustrated three children's books. She is a leading colourist and painter of abstract landscapes. She was elected a Fellow of the Royal Watercolour Society in 2022. She is the author of an art blog.

== Career ==
Born Nov 7, 1951 in Philadelphia, USA, Richmond grew up in Rome, before moving to London in 1969. Her early work is very figurative and based on direct observation.

After graduating from Chelsea School of Art with a BA (Fine Art) in 1974, where she studied with Ken Kiff, Prunella Clough, Gillian Ayres, and others, Richmond took an MA in Art History at Chelsea with Nicholas Wadley. She had her first one-woman show of paintings at the Ben Uri Gallery, London in 1976. Since then, she has exhibited regularly in London, New York, and at regional galleries in France, the US, and the UK. She held the post of visiting professor in art at the University of California, Santa Cruz (1985), and at Yale University (2002). Since 1976 she has exhibited regularly in London's West End in particular at the Mercury Gallery, and the Curwen Gallery

In 2021 she was elected a Fellow of the Royal Watercolour Society.

== Awards and honours ==
- Royal Watercolour Society [9]: Arthur Wise Prize, 2023.
- Royal Watercolour Society: Associate Fellow, 2018, Fellow, 2022.
- Yale University: Fellow of Morse College, 2002
- Jacob Mendelsohn Memorial Foundation Scholarship, 1982
- Chelsea School of Art: BA (Fine Art) 1974, MA (Art History) 1975

== Books ==
- Richmond, R. (2017). Living Landscape. London Curwen Gallery and the White Stork Press. ISBN 978-0-9552060-1-6.
- Richmond, R. (2006). The Storm Tree. London White Stork Press.
- Richmond, R. (1994). Frida Kahlo in Mexico. London and Petaluma Pomegranate Art Press.
- Richmond, R. (1992). Introducing Michelangelo. London Little Brown and Co.
- Richmond, R. (1992). Michelangelo and the Creation of the Sistine Chapel. London Barrie and Jenkins; New York Random House.
- Richmond, R. (1992). Animals in Art (The Story in a Picture). Nashville TE Ideals Publishing
- Richmond, R. (1992). Children in Art The Story in a Picture. Nashville TE Ideals Publishing

== Selected Art Criticism by Robin Richmond ==
- The Art Newspaper, 1998. The wings of a butterfly, Bonnard at the Tate Gallery March, p. 16, Issue 79.
- The Art Newspaper, 1998. The frog and the swallow reunited: Frida Kahlo in Copenhagen, Issue 78, February.
- The Art Newspaper, 1988. The playful Klee.
- Modern Painters, 1998. Berthe Morisot at the Musée Marmotton.
- Modern Painters, 1993. Finding the Vortex (Henri Gaudier-Brzeska), Autumn, pp. 80–82.
- Modern Painters, 1993. Thoughts about a Bird Bath (Henri Gaudier-Brzeska), September.
- Modern Painters, 1992. Close Encounters with Michelangelo, Summer, pp. 72–74.

== Selected solo exhibitions ==
- 2024 Common Ground, Royal Watercolour Society Gallery, Whitcomb Street
- 2022 Mineral Histories, Coningsby Gallery, London
- 2019 Hesperides. Little Buckland Gallery, Broadway, Gloucestershire
- 2018 Caldera. Hotel de Ville, Saint-Yrieix-La-Perche, France
- 2017 Lodestone. Piers Feetham Gallery, London
- 2017 The Art Spaces, Cass Art, London
- 2016 Living Landscape. Curwen Gallery, London
- 2014 On Solitary Fields. Curwen Gallery, London
- 2012 Retrospective Château d'Excideuil, France
- 2012 The Still Point of the Turning World. Curwen and New Academy Gallery, London
- 2011 Morse College, Yale University, New Haven CT
- 2010 Sermons in Stones. Atrium Gallery, City University London
- 2010 Stones of the Sky. Curwen and New Academy Gallery, London
- 2008 Landscape Mysteries. Curwen and New Academy Gallery
- 2007 GlaxoSmithKline, London
- 2006 Watercolours from The Storm Tree, Curwen and New Academy Gallery
- 2006 Sacred Geographies. Paul Sharpe Contemporary Art, New York City, USA
- 2005 Between the Real and the Ideal. City Atrium Gallery; City University, London
- 2005 Sacred Geographies. Curwen Gallery, London
- 2002 The Land, the Water, the Air, the City. Curwen and New Academy Gallery.
- 2000 Buried Images. Southern Exposure Gallery, South Florida.
- 1999 Yew Tree Gallery, Slad, Glos.
- 1998 Vessels. Curwen Gallery, London
- 1994 Rebecca Hossack Gallery, London
- 1992 From Bone to Stone. Mercury Gallery, London
- 1992 Michelangelo Studies. Barbican Centre, London
- 1990 Mercury Gallery, London
- 1989 Mercury Gallery, London
- 1987 From the Distance. Boundary Gallery London
- 1980 Off Centre Gallery, London
- 1976 Ben Uri Gallery, London

== Selected Group Exhibitions ==
Richmond has contributed to regular group exhibitions, 1989–2024 at the Royal Watercolour Society, Bankside Gallery and Whitcomb Street Gallery, London; 1989–2016 at the Curwen and New Academy Gallery, London; and 1988–1993 at the Mercury Gallery, London.
