= Michal Cole =

British-Israeli artist

Michal Cole (Hebrew: מיכל קול) is a British-Israeli artist born in Haifa, Israel in 1974 to parents who emigrated from Morocco. She works primarily with the mediums of photography, video, tapestry, sculpture, watercolour and uses money in her works.

== Early life and education ==
After completing her service in the Israeli Defence Forces, Michal left Israel in the mid-1990s and travelled to Paris to take foundational art courses, while being homeless for a period of time. She settled in London in 1997, where she pursued her Bachelor of Arts in Fine Art from Central Saint Martin’s College of Art & Design. While attending university she created a number of works in which she used fragments of real money. A group of bankers were interested in buying many of her works and ended up becoming inappropriately sexual in their language with her. After they gave her their ties after believing she was flirting with them, she used them as inspiration and materials for her 2017 Venice Biennale Pavilion of Humanity exhibition Top Gun. Cole later completed her Master of Art in Fine Art from Chelsea College of Arts at the University of the Arts London in 2013.

== Artistic career ==
=== Textiles ===
In Michal Cole’s textile pieces Inferno, 2013 and Clamare, 2013, Cole referenced famous art pieces such as Sandro Botticelli's Mappa dell’Inferno and Edvard Munch's The Scream with lavish colours and cheerful compositions through textiles. She attempted to bring religious figurative paintings back to life through the more contemporary medium of tapestry that more accurately depicted current views and beliefs as a reflection of society.

Exhibited at the 2017 Venice Biennale, Michal Cole created a work titled Top Gun in the Pavilion of Humanity, which was made of tens of thousands of used men’s ties including those of men she knew and men who had either harassed her or her friends. The ties were strenuously tied together to cover the floor, walls, a fireplace, a sofa, a pipe, a mounted moose on the wall and a rifle which all encompass a traditionally masculine styled living room. Ties were specifically chosen as they represent a piece of clothing typically worn by men for historically masculine activities such as boardroom and workplace life, witnessing business deals, hiring employees, and winding down at a pub. Cole’s intention of the subject was to comment on the oppression of women that is more apparent under Donald Trump’s government than ever before; including issues such as the gender pay gap, sexual harassment and a predominantly male political office. The piece similarly spoke to personal inequalities that were apparent in Cole’s life, such as her being a victim of sexual abuse, serving mandatory time in the military where hundreds of cases of sexual assault are disregarded, and her grandmother being a child bride.

Michal Cole’s use of textiles has been exhibited in pieces such as After Caravaggio and Roses in a process where she replicated famous paintings and destroyed them before the paint had dried. The pieces were later transformed in to fabric textiles, which involved mapping out and recreating the paintings with materials such as Tibetan highland wool, Bikaner wool, Chinese silk and nettle.

=== Installation art ===
==== Mute-Ululation ====
Michal Cole exhibited a site-specific video installation at Ex Bazzi Gallery at the 2015 Venice Biennale’s Pavilion of Humanity titled Mute-Ululation. This work addresses Cole’s identity as a resident of England who is of Sephardi ethnicity. For this installation, Michal travelled to Morocco and Israel and filmed women’s mouths while performing the traditional celebratory ululation: a long, repetitive, high-pitched vocal sound that involves the rapid movement of the tongue side to side in the mouth. On three walls in a darkened room, the videos of these women assemble frame-by-frame until there are hundreds of mouths simultaneously performing the ululation at a loud volume. This work was used to showcase a unifying bond amongst women that transcends geographical borders, religions and ideologies, while empowering these women and showcasing their poetic happiness and expression. It similarly is a piece in which Cole grapples with her own identity as having significant elements of her life that are tied in Middle-Eastern and Moroccan culture while having adopted aspects of Western culture due to living in the United Kingdom.

==== Objection ====
After numerous visits to Istanbul, Michal Cole met Ekin Onat, a Turkish Muslim artist who addresses female and political issues of contemporary Turkey. The two staged their joint project Objection in the Pavilion of Humanity at the 2017 Venice Biennale. The project revolved around the notion of the home, based on their independent yet complementary artistic interpretations.

The exhibition, which featured a number of rooms in an artificial home included Cole’s textile room Top Gun and raised the question of the role of arts and culture in times of crisis, political upheaval and change while uniformly making an argument of compassion and non-violent protest. Both women transformed the Venetian villa “to give an artistic home to women’s rights and free speech.”

Through the numerous rooms in the home, both artists contemplate with political oppression and the power of speech, which is shown in Cole’s Domestic Godless, a video installation in the kitchen which showcased different videos coming from screens inside cups, bowls and teapots, in which the subject is shown to be screaming. The videos are meant to be representative of a time in Cole’s life where she was left ‘howling like an injured dog’ and addresses the role of women across all planes of human existence. Specifically it showcases how inner frustrations at unrealistic pressures are universally placed upon women, such as being beautiful, smart, maternal, and sexual. In the traditionally feminized location of the kitchen, the screams and female outrage can be heard coming from the videos, giving the voice to the woman, where she would have traditionally taken on a role of servitude.

The upper floor of the home held collaborative works by the two artists titled The Journey Between Human Being and Being Human. Voices could be heard coming from behind a locked door and when the listener approached the keyhole in an attempt to get the clearest sound, the voices became increasingly overlapped making it apparent that different languages were being spoken between the women. The themes of speaking and silence continued in the master bedroom, where Absent Presence is a lifelike model of the artist sitting with their backs facing one-another on the bed.

== Awards and honours ==
Apart from showcasing work twice at the Venice Biennale, in 2015 and 2017, as well as exhibiting in Sotheby’s Michal Cole has exhibited her work worldwide to much acclaim. She is the winner of the My Art Space Scope Miami competition, the 2011 Signature Art Awards, the Saatchi Gallery’s Showdown competition award in London.

== Personal life ==
After visiting London as a teenager, Cole built a group titled the Heavy Metalists in Tel Aviv which took over nightclubs and formed a mini revolution of anarchy and mayhem. The intention of the group was to challenge existing local beliefs, views, fashion and musical tastes by communicating new ideas of freedom, specifically artistic freedom, atheism and passion for challenging conformity. The group, led by Cole until the age of 18, grew in popularity and was featured in mainstream media. After running away to Paris when she was 17 in an attempt to avoid recruitment, Cole was recruited at age 18 to the Israeli Defense Forces to serve mandatory military service.

Michal Cole’s parents are Moroccan Jews who trace their roots back to the Jews of Spain who migrated to Morocco after the Spanish Inquisition. Her parents left Morocco in the early 1950s, being deported by sea to Israel where they were placed in refugee camps and suffered poverty and racial discrimination as a new minority in Israel. Much of Cole’s work involves the notions of displacement and exile – both internal and external. Due to the merging of her Moroccan-Israeli ethnicity and adopted Western cultural aspects, she explores the collisions of tradition and modernity while similarly delving in to the roles of women and the absurdity of global inequality in her work.

Michal Cole uses her artworks as a form of celebration and examination of the human condition while inviting the viewer to contemplate the beauty, joy, and humour of life set against the uncontrollable social, economic, political and religious injustices and hypocrisies that inevitably affect us. She is specifically fascinated by moments of transition – economical transitions, religious shifts, the collapse of beliefs and infrastructures and loss of faith. Cole attempts to envision the possibility of order born from chaos and mayhem, creativity out of destruction and inspiration derived from man’s fallibility and stupidity.

The artist Cole is most inspired by is Caravaggio due to his rebelliousness and insanity, and the eroticism, drama and violence of his work. She spent a summer touring Italy in search of his original artworks.
