= Excideuil =

- Commune
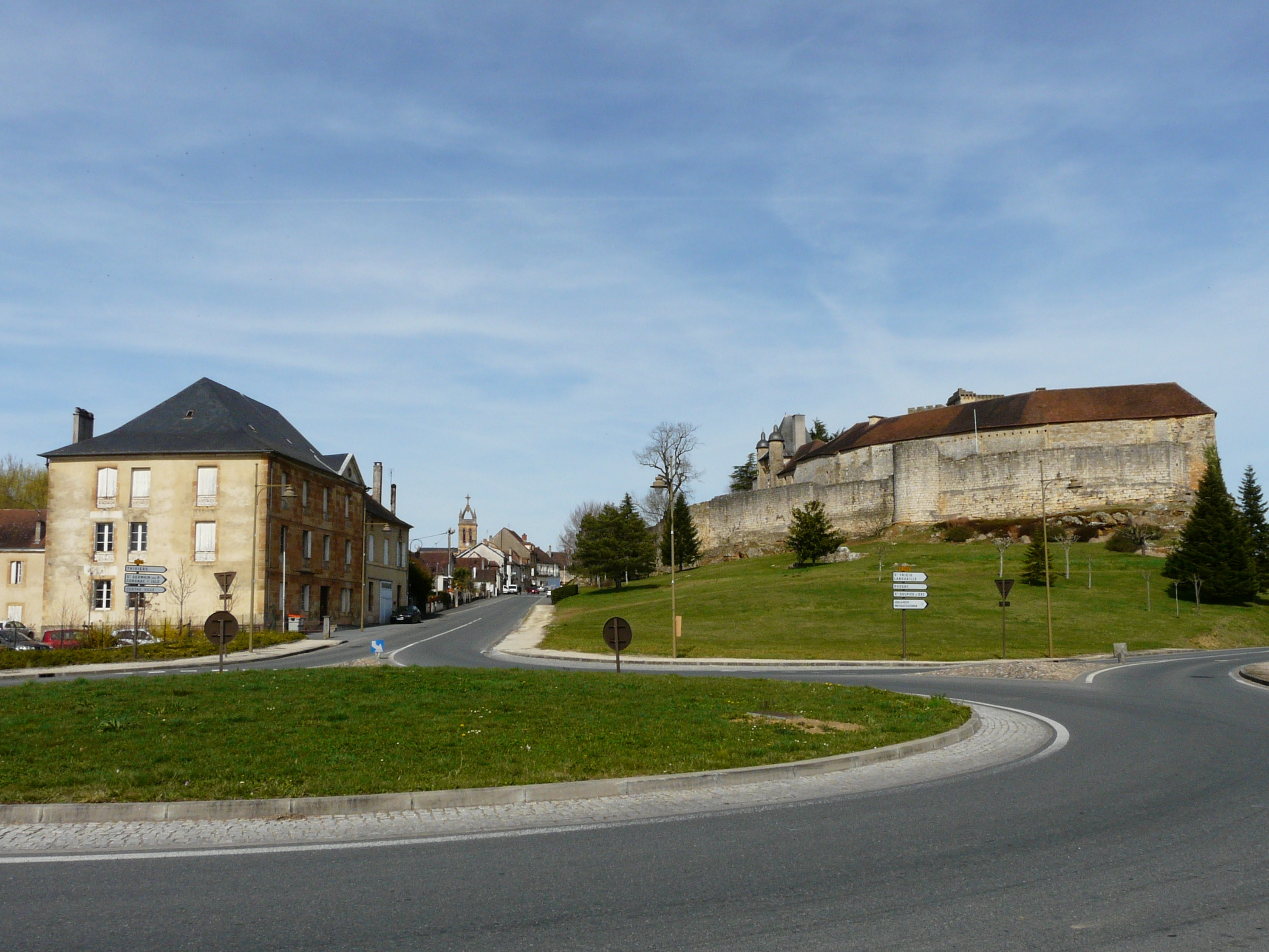
- Château d'Excideuil (right)

- Coat of arms
- Location of Excideuil
- Location within France Location within Nouvelle-Aquitaine
- Coordinates: 45°20′15″N 1°03′01″E
- Country: France
- Region: Nouvelle-Aquitaine
- Department: Dordogne
- Arrondissement: Nontron
- Canton: Isle-Loue-Auvézère

Government
  - Mayor (2020–2026): Marie-Laure Lacoste
- Area^{1}: 5.02 km^{2} (1.94 sq mi)
- Elevation: 150 m (490 ft)
- Highest elevation: 253 m (830 ft)
- Lowest elevation: 140 m (460 ft)
- Population (2023): 1,201
  - Density: 239/km^{2} (620/sq mi)
- Time zone: UTC+01:00 (CET)
  - Summer (DST): UTC+02:00 (CEST)
- INSEE/Postal code: 24164 /24160
- ^{1} French Land Register data, which excludes lakes, ponds, glaciers > 1 km^{2} (0.386 sq mi or 247 acres) and river estuaries.

Excideuil (French pronunciation: [ɛksidœj]; Occitan: Eissiduelh) is a commune in the Dordogne department in Nouvelle-Aquitaine, southwestern France.

== Geography ==
Excideuil is located in the Périgord Vert area, on a limestone plateau between the upper courses of the rivers Isle and Auvézère. The river Loue runs through the town. Excideuil is located about 60 km (37 mi) from Limoges, 34 km (21 mi) from Périgueux, 15 km (9.3 mi) from Hautefort and 12 km (7.5 mi) from Tourtoirac. Its built-up area continues into the territory of the adjacent communes Saint-Martial-d'Albarède and Saint-Médard-d'Excideuil.

== History ==
The first reference to Excideuil, as Exidolium is found in a will document from Aredius, also known as Yrieix, dated 572. The town has been referred also as Issidor, Excidour and Excideuilh. This name is made of the Celtic word ialo (meaning "clearing, glade", "place of") suffixed to a radical Exito (Gaul name) or Exitus.

Excideuil was attacked in 1182 around Pentecost by Richard I of England, as mentioned in Rerum gallicarum et francicarum scriptores:

Richardus, Henrici II filius, a patre Pictavensis Comes institutus, anno 1182 in exercitu Francorum Regis militabat adversus Philippum Flandriae Comitem. Eodem anno, mense julio, pace composita cum Lemovicensi vicecomite, duos ejus filios accepit obsides, et a Petragorico Comite castrum Petragoricum cum propugnaculis solo aequavit. Cum interim tractatum esset cum Engolismensibus et Petragoricensibus, circa Pentecosten Exidolium rediit, et ejusdem castri burgum cepit.

Gui d'Excideuil is an Old French romance, written in the 12th century, whose text is now lost.

== Population ==
Historical population
Year	Pop.	±% p.a.
1968	1,660	—
1975	1,663	+0.03%
1982	1,535	−1.14%
1990	1,414	−1.02%
1999	1,318	−0.78%
2007	1,323	+0.05%
2012	1,168	−2.46%
2017	1,177	+0.15%
2023	1,201	+0.34%
Source: INSEE

== Notable persons ==
- Thomas Robert Bugeaud (1784–1849), Marshal of France and Governor-General of Algeria
- Philippe Parrot (1831–1894), painter

== Sights ==
- Château d'Excideuil, 13th-18th century, national heritage site of France

== See also ==
- Communes of the Dordogne department
