= Parrot (disambiguation) =

Parrots are birds found mostly in tropical and subtropical regions.

Parrot may also refer to:

== Businesses ==
- Parrot SA, a French company which produces wireless products and drones
- Parrot Corporation, a British floppy disk manufacturer
- Parrot Records, American record label, a division of London Records
- Parrot Records (blues label), American Chicago-based record label
- Parrot Speed Fastener Company, original name of Swingline, a manufacturer of staplers and hole punches

== Computing ==
- Parrot virtual machine, an interpreter currently being developed for Perl 6 and other dynamic programming languages
- Parrot assembly language, an assembly language used to program the virtual machine
- Parrot Security OS, a penetration-testing operating system

== People ==
- Parrot (surname)
- Parrot Chaak, ruler of La Mar, an ancient Maya settlement

== Other uses ==
- Parrot, Kentucky, an unincorporated community
- Parrot (crater), a lunar impact crater
- CZAW Parrot, a Czech light-sport aircraft
- UP Parrots, a former name of the UP Fighting Maroons, the varsity teams of the University of the Philippines
- Parrot, a title character of Parrot and Olivier in America, a 2009 novel by Peter Carey

== See also ==
- Parrot Cay, an island in the Turks and Caicos Islands
- Parrott (disambiguation)
- Parott, a type of bread in Kashmiri cuisine
- Paradoxornithidae, an Old World passerine bird of the family Paradoxornithidae
- Parrotfish, a Perciformes marine fish of the family Scaridae, and two other fish, the blood parrot and the parrot cichlid
