= Emily Forbes =

British entrepreneur

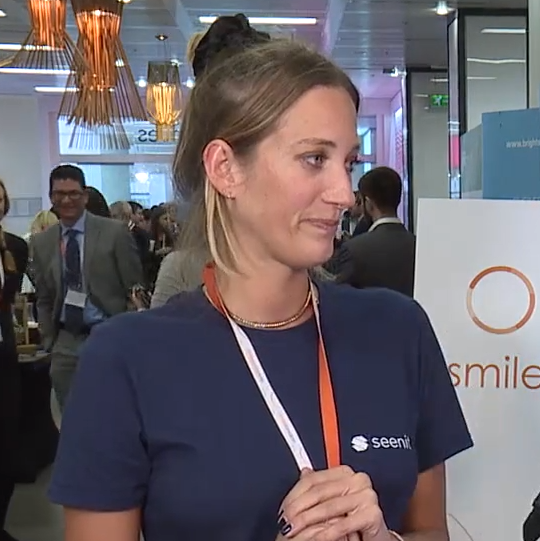
- Emily Forbes in 2016
- Born: 1986 or 1987 (age 38–39)
- Education: Chelsea College of Arts
- Employer(s): Seenit; Working Title Films
- Awards: Forbes 30 Under 30
- Website: seenit.io

Emily Forbes is a British entrepreneur and the founder of Seenit, a collaborative video platform launched in 2014. Before founding Seenit, she worked in film production at Working Title Films.

== Early life and education ==
Forbes attended Chelsea College of Arts, where she studied film. Her father, David Forbes, is a director at Savills. She went on to study visual communication.

== Career ==
Forbes worked on production of feature films for five years at Working Title Films. She was working as a documentary maker in South Africa when she had the idea to create an app to encourage collaboration in filmmaking. In 2014, Forbes founded Seenit, an app that allows users to collaboratively create content with colleagues, usable only by invitation. She received support from BBC Lab UK and Rupert Hambro as well as £40,000 from Creative England.

Forbes is outspoken about the challenges that women entrepreneurs face. She took part in the Mayor of London's SVC2UK (Silicon Valley Comes to UK), which included a trade mission of women founders to Silicon Valley.

=== Awards ===
Forbes has won the TechCrunch Disrupt award as well as Forbes 30 Under 30 in 2016.
