= Mary Dobson =

British artist

- Born: 1912; London, England
- Died: 1977 (aged 64–65)
- Education: Bournemouth Municipal School of Art; Chelsea Polytechnic; Central School of Arts and Crafts
- Known for: Painting, stained glass design

Mary Dobson (1912-1977) was a British artist, who was originally a painter and illustrator but later specialised in producing stained glass and mosaic works.

== Biography ==
Dobson was born in London and attended the Bournemouth Municipal School of Art from 1930 to 1934, then studied at Chelsea Polytechnic in London during 1936 and 1937 before spending a year at the Central School of Arts and Crafts. While still a student she established herself as a freelance illustrator. During World War II Dobson served in the Women's Royal Naval Service and after she was demobbed in 1947 returned to producing illustrations for a range of publications. These included The Strand Magazine, Nursery World and newspapers including both the Daily Mail and Daily Herald. Dobson had her first solo exhibition of her paintings in 1953 and also exhibited at the Royal Academy in London and with the New English Art Club and the Society of Women Artists, with whom she was a board member. Later Dobson specialised in stained glass and mosaic works. In 1957 and 1958 she created painted and stained glass windows for the Hastings Fishermen's Museum, which is housed in a former church. As well as London, Dobson lived for a time at Shipbourne in Kent. She later died in 1977.
