= Mojeb al-Dousari =

Mojeb al-Dousari (1922–1956, Arabic: معجب عبدالله محمد عبدالله الدوسري) was a Kuwaiti artist and draughtsman. He is regarded by many artists and academics as the founder of portrait art in the region.

al-Dousari attended al-Mubarakiya High School, where he studied painting. In 1945, he went to Egypt where he spent five years, after which he gained a diploma in decorative arts. In 1950, he spent two years in England, where he joined the Chelsea School of Art (now known as Chelsea College of Art and Design) and the Liverpool Academy of Arts.

al-Dousari launched the first ever art gallery in Kuwait. Later, he participated in two exhibitions in 1951 and 1954.

During his short lifetime, al-Dousari painted almost 300 portraits and landscapes, most of which are deeply rooted in the Kuwaiti culture. Most of his works were bought by many members of the ruling family.
