= Louise Parrott Cochran =

American social worker

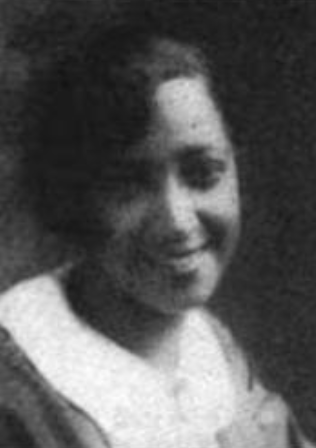
- Louise Parrott (later Cochran), from a 1928 publication
- Born: Sarah Louise Parrott; September 6, 1903; Baltimore, Maryland, U.S.
- Died: December 14, 1956 (aged 53); New York, New York, U.S.
- Occupation: Social worker
- Known for: Work with Girl Scouts

Sarah Louise Parrott Cochran (September 6, 1903 – December 14, 1956) was an American social worker known for her work in Girl Scouting, the YWCA, and the USO at the national level.

== Early life and education ==
Sarah Louise Parrott was born in Baltimore, Maryland, the daughter of Pendleton P. Parrott and Veronica Parrott. Her father was a stenographer in a bank. She graduated from the Colored High School in Baltimore in 1920, with further studies at the University of Chicago and the New York School of Social Work.

== Career ==
Louise Parrott taught physical education classes in Baltimore schools as a young woman. She was the first Black field captain for the Manhattan Girl Scout Council when she was hired in 1928. Her office was in the New York Urban League headquarters.

In 1930, Cochran was director of junior activities at the YWCA on West 137th Street. She was a supervisor for the National Youth Administration. She was USO program development director on the national board of the YWCA during World War II, training Black USO and YWCA volunteers and speaking about Black women's roles in the war effort. She was director of leadership training and director of program development with the national Girl Scouts organization after the war.

== Personal life ==
Parrott married Myron E. Cochran. She died in 1956, at the age of 53, at Bellevue Hospital in New York City.
