= 2014 Kabul Serena Hotel shooting =

Taliban attack in Afghanistan

2014 Kabul Serena Hotel attack
- Part of the War in Afghanistan (2001–2021)
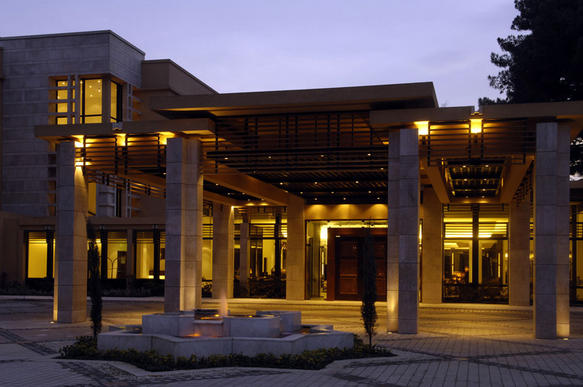
- Kabul Serena Hotel
- Location: 34°31′14″N 69°10′41″E; Kabul, Islamic Republic of Afghanistan
- Date: 20 March 2014; 20:30 – 23:30 (UTC+4:30)
- Target: Foreign election observers and journalists
- Attack type: Suicide attack
- Deaths: 9
- Injuries: 2
- Perpetrator: Taliban

On 20 March 2014, Taliban militants carried out a mass shooting in the restaurant of the Kabul Serena Hotel, in Kabul, Afghanistan. The shooting, which took place in a hotel popular with foreigners and wealthy Afghans, killed nine civilians, including five foreigners. The attack was a shock to many as it took place in a heavily fortified area of Kabul.

== Attack ==
Four teenage Taliban militants smuggled firearms broken down into pieces in their shoes and socks and then hid in the hotel for several hours before commencing the attack. Armed with small handguns, the gunmen stormed the hotel's restaurant at around 8:30–9:00 pm, firing on guests as they dined and celebrated Nowruz, the Persian new year. Guests in the hotel barricaded themselves in their rooms and others fled. Nine people were killed, including Ahmad Sardar (a prominent Afghan journalist), Sardar's wife and two of their children, a Canadian, a New Zealander, two Bangladeshis, and a Paraguayan diplomat. Afghan security forces responded to the attack, sealing off the hotel and launching a hunt for the gunmen. One of the militants was killed by armed hotel staff while the other three hid in the hotel. The search for the gunmen lasted several hours and ended when Afghan commandos killed them.

=== Victims ===
Deaths by nationality
Country	Number
Afghanistan	4
New Zealand	1
Canada	1
Bangladesh	2
Paraguay	1
Total	9

Notable victims:

- Ahmad Sardar, Afghan journalist for Agence France-Presse.

== Perpetrators ==
The Taliban claimed responsibility for the attack. The Afghan National Directorate of Security blamed Pakistani intelligence agencies for carrying out the attack, further adding that it was "unusual" that Pakistani nationals were not present in the hotel at the time of the attack. However, it was reported that one Pakistani national was killed during the shooting although the Pakistani foreign office issued a statement saying the national was alive but in a coma as well as condemning the attack.

== Aftermath ==
The National Democratic Institute (NDI) and the Organization for Security and Co-operation in Europe withdrew their election observers in response to the attack; one victim was an observer working for the NDI.

== See also ==
- 2008 Kabul Serena Hotel attack: a similar attack that occurred on the same hotel six years prior
- 2015 Park Palace guesthouse attack: an attack by the Taliban on a Kabul guesthouse hosting foreign nationals
- List of Islamist terrorist attacks
- List of terrorist attacks in Kabul
- List of terrorist incidents, January–June 2014
