= Ahmad Sardar =

Afghan journalist

Ahmad Sardar (died March 20, 2014) was an Afghan journalist. He, along with nearly his entire family, was killed by Taliban gunmen in a mass shooting in Kabul in March 2014. He was 40 years old.

== Career ==
Sardar began his career as a journalist in 2001 with the fall of the Taliban, when he started working as a translator for Japanese journalists. He was hired by Agence France-Press in 2003 to cover the daily briefings by the United States-led coalition at Bagram Airfield, and became well known in the Afghan media world, and had quickly worked his way up to senior correspondent for AFP at the time of his death. He also headed a successful media firm, Pressistan, which he founded in 2009 to support visiting foreign correspondents and to train local journalists. Interviewed in 2012, Sardar said of his job: "I don't think the experiences of a journalist in a country like Afghanistan and a city like Kabul are that pleasant. For example, suicide attacks: we have to go to the scene and look at something very tragic, we have no choice." Ironically his last article was on male lion cub Marjan, on March 19, 2014, which narrated the pathetic state in which Marjan was being housed on a rooftop by a businessman, who had bought the male lion cub as a status symbol for $20,000, and kept his pet on a roof terrace.

== Death ==
On the evening of March 20, 2014, as the Taliban insurgency was escalating in the run up to the April national elections, Ahmad and his family were having dinner at the Serena Hotel in Kabul, to celebrate the Persian New Year, Nowruz. Four Taliban gunmen sneaked weapons into the hotel before going to its restaurant and opening fire; they killed nine people. Four of those killed were Sardar, his wife Humaira, his daughter, Nelofar (aged 6) and his eldest son, Omar (5). The youngest son, two-year-old Abuzar, was hit with multiple rounds and went into a coma, but survived the attack. According to Afghan officials, Sardar's family were not the deliberate target of the attack. One of the attackers was believed killed by one of the hotel's armed guards; the rest were killed by Afghan special forces. Surviving son Abuzar may go to Canada to live with an uncle. While they claimed responsibility for the attack, after realising who had been killed, the Taliban insisted the murders of Sardar and his family had been unintentional, a result of crossfire, even going so far as to issue a rare apology for the deaths of the children.

Sardar's death was mourned by an eclectic mix of Afghans and foreigners, from President Hamid Karzai, who visited his surviving son in hospital, to former warlord Abdul Rashid Dostum. Many Afghan journalists said they would boycott every Taliban statement and every Taliban-related story for two weeks in protest. Ahmad was described by his bureau chief as "[c]lever, informed, stylish and bubbling with boyish enthusiasm, [...] a five-star journalist, a friend to all at AFP—and a man who impressed every single person he ever met." Mujib Mashal of Harper's Magazine, who met Sardar a month before his death to discuss setting up a magazine, praised his sheer endurance, "something increasingly rare in his generation of Afghan reporters, many of whom have moved on to new careers, exhausted by more than a decade of conflict." Fellow Afghan journalist Harun Najafizada noted that Sardar had had any number of opportunities to leave Afghanistan, but had always opted to stay. The UN Security Council condemned the attack, with International Federation of Journalists describing Sardar's murder as a "horrifying killing", while Irina Bokova, director-general of UNESCO, said Ahmad's loss would be felt "keenly". The American Embassy in Kabul rearranged a press conference so as not to clash with a vigil taking place the Wednesday after his death. His Pressistan Twitter account, which Sardar was always active on, was taken over by his friends to continue as a source of news and views in Afghanistan.
