= Henry Parrot =

17th-century English epigrammatist

Henry Parrot (fl. 1600–1626) was an English epigrammatist.

== Life ==
Parrot published five little volumes of epigrams and satires during the first quarter of the 17th century. Some lines in one of his satires have been regarded as an indication that he was at one time a player at the Fortune Playhouse. He wrote mainly for the delectation of choice spirits among the members of the Inns of Court. There is a suggestion, from lines in the epigrams, that he was a senior clerk at the Court of Exchequer.

Each epigram has a title in Latin; this may relate to the practice in grammar schools of the day to set students Latin epigrams to write on particular topics. The fact that the phrase "springes for woodcocks" occurs twice in Hamlet, combined with the fact that another of Parrot's works is entitled "The Mous-trap" (the name of the play which Hamlet presented to entrap the king), suggests that the epigrammatist sought to make capital out of the current popularity of Shakespeare's play. His verses contain allusions to Thomas Coryat, Bankes's Horse, and many other topics of contemporary interest. Thomas Seccombe wrote: "His epigrams contain probably more spirit than those of such rivals as Thomas Heywood, Thomas Bastard, and William Goddard, though infinitely less humour than the satirical writings of Thomas Dekker or Nicholas Breton."

== Works ==
The following are Parrot's works:

1. The Mous-Trap. Uni, si possim, posse placare sat est. "Printed at London for F[rancis] B[urton], dwelling at the Flower de Luce and Crowne in Pauls Churchyard" (1606). A very rare little volume of epigrams, purchased for £9 at the Nassau sale in 1820 for the British Museum.
2. Epigrams by H. P. Mortui non mordent. "Imprinted at London by R. B., and are to be soulde by John Helme at his shop in St. Dunstan's Churchyard" (1608). The Stationers' Company Register gives this book the alternative title of Humors Lottrye.
3. Laquei Ridiculosi, or Springes to catch Woodcocks. Caveat Emptor. "London, printed for John Busby, and are to be sould at his shop in St. Dunstans Churchyarde in Fleet Street" (1613). The volume contains 216 epigrams, mostly licentious. On the title-page a cut represents two woodcocks caught in snares and another flying away with the motto Possis abire tutus. The writer says the epigrams were written some two years before, and printed without his privity. The work seems to have been well known; John Taylor, the water-poet, purposes in his Epigram (No. vii.) to "catch a parrot in the woodcocke's springe."
4. The Mastive, or Young-Whelpe of the Old-Dogge. Epigrams and Satyrs. Horat. verba decent iratum plena minarum. "London, printed by Tho. Creede for Richard Meighen and Thomas Jones, and are to be solde at S. Clements Church, without Temple" (1615). There is a large cut of a mastiff on the title-page, which seems to have been modelled upon that of the "Mastif-Whelp" of William Goddard. The epigrams, which are often smart and generally coarse, are prefixed by clever Latin mottos, and are followed by three satires and a paradox upon war. Hunter conjectured that this collection might have been the work of Henry Peacham, but the internal evidence is convincingly in favour of Parrot's authorship.
5. Cures for the Itch. Characters, Epigrams, Epitaphs, by H. P. Scalpat qui tangitur. "London, printed for Thomas Iones at the signe of the Blacke Raven in the Strand" (1626). The epitaphs and epigrams, according to the preface, were written in 1624 during the long vacation, and the characters, which "were not so fully perfected as was meant, were composed of later times."

Attributed to Parrot's initials in the Stationers' Register is also Gossips Greeting (1620); a copy, which belonged to Richard Heber, has not been traced to any public collection.

== See also ==
- List of English poets
