= Philippe Parrot =

French painter

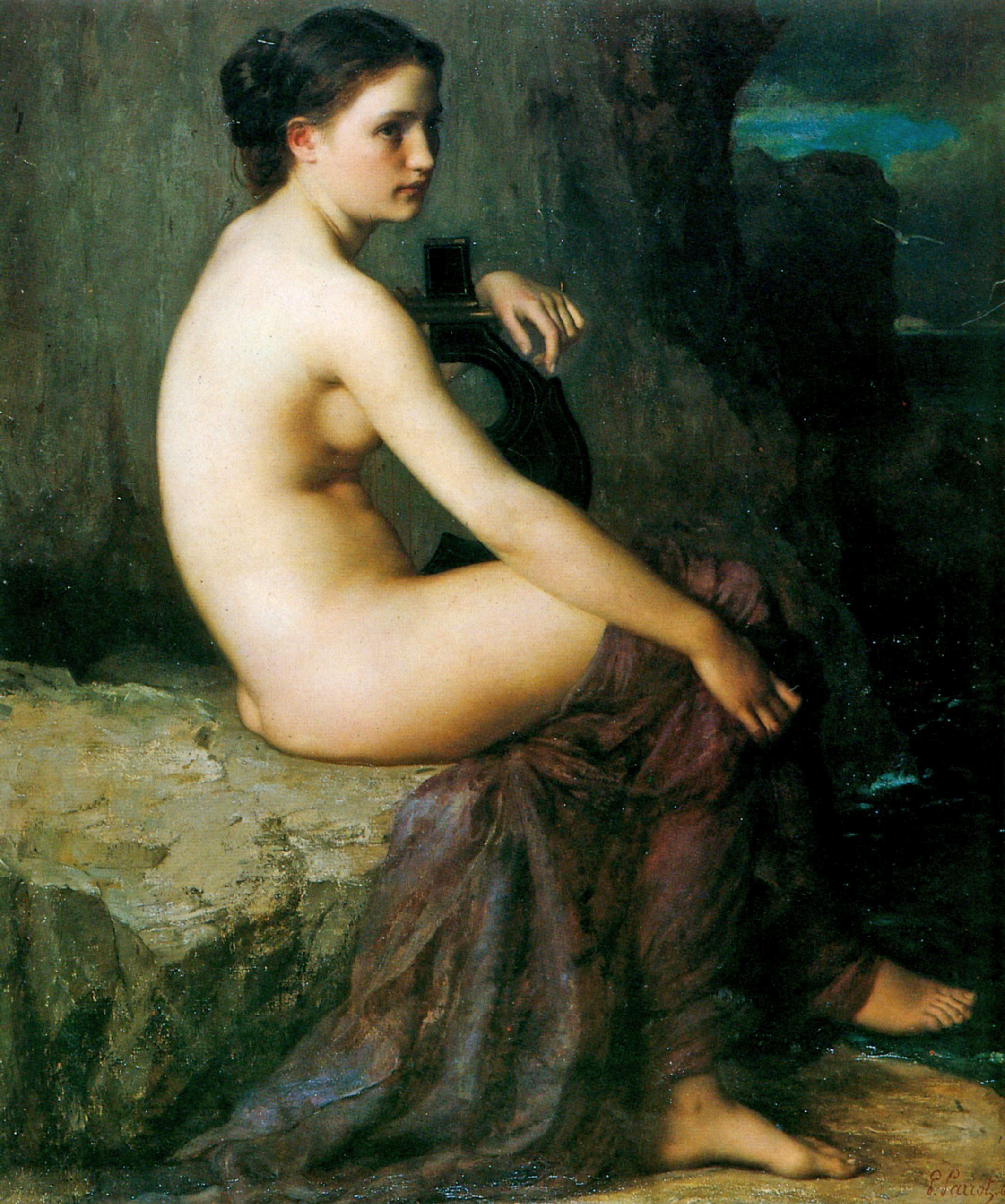
Élégie (1868)

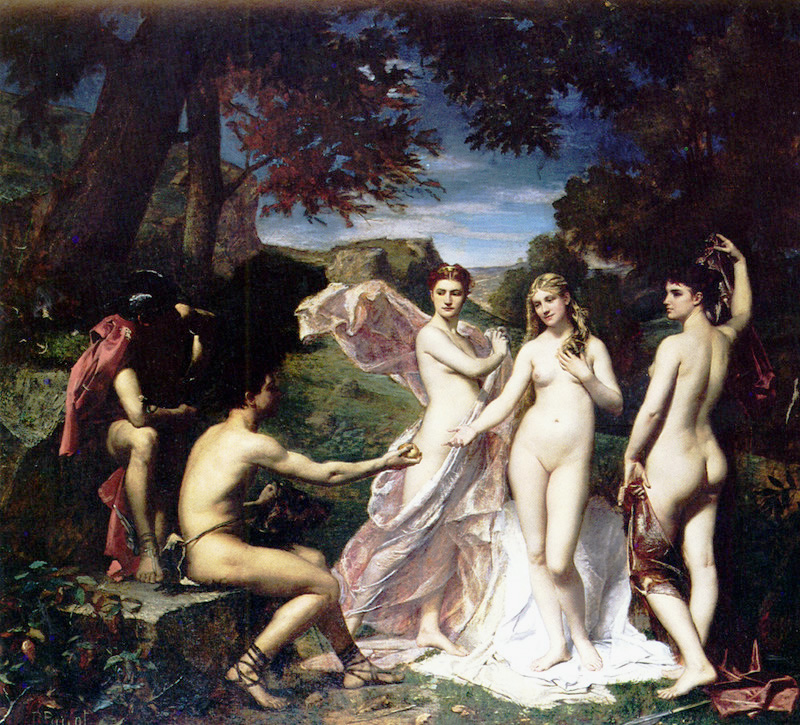
Le Jugement De Paris

Philippe Parrot (French: [filip paʁo]; born 13 May 1831 in Excideuil, died 1894) was a French painter. A street in Périgueux is named after him.

== Selected works ==
- Elegy, oil on canvas, 148 x 106 cm, 1868, Bordeaux, Musée des Beaux-Arts
- Bacchante, oil on canvas, 98.5 x 174.8 cm, 1892, Ghent, Musée des Beaux-Arts
- Allegory, oil on canvas, 191 x 95, 1880, Ghent, Musée des Beaux-Arts

== Sources ==
- Famous Pictures Reproduced from Renowned Paintings by the World's Greatest Artists, Chicago: Stanton and Van Vliet, 1917, p. 185
- Clara Erskine Clement Waters and Laurence Hutton, Artists of the Nineteenth Century and Their Works: A Handbook Containing Two Thousand and Fifty Biographical Sketches, Boston: Houghton, Osgood, 1879, p. 164
- Cyclopedia of Painters and Paintings, Ed. John Denison Champlin and Charles Callahan Perkins, 4 vols., Volume 3, New York: Scribner, 1887, p. 398
- Clara Harrison Stranahan, A History of French Painting from its Earliest to its Latest Practice: including an account of the French academy of painting, its salons, schools of instruction and regulations, New York: Scribner, 1888, p. 362
