= Alice Kagawa Parrott =

Japanese-American fiber artist and ceramicist

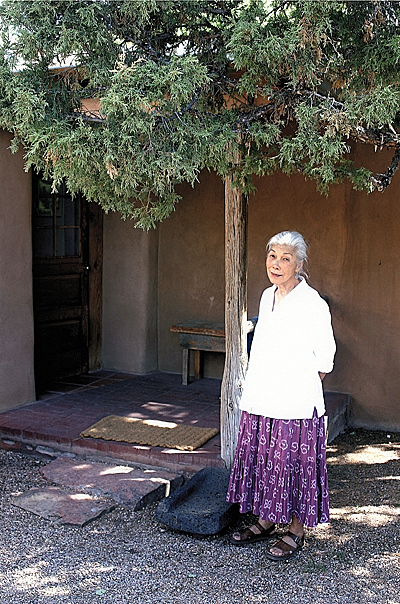
- Kagawa in 2004
- Born: February 12, 1929; Honolulu, Hawaii
- Died: September 11, 2009 (aged 80)
- Education: University of Hawaii at Manoa; Cranbrook Academy of Art
- Known for: Weaving, ceramics
- Spouse: Allen Morgan Parrott

Alice Kagawa Parrott (February 12, 1929 – September 11, 2009) was a Japanese American fiber artist and ceramicist. She spent most of her adult life in Santa Fe, New Mexico, where she established a reputation as one of the country's most important weavers, and opened one of Santa Fe's first shops devoted weaving and crafts.

== Early life ==
=== Education ===
Born in Honolulu, Hawaiʻi, to Takato and Isono Kagawa, a Japanese immigrant couple, Kagawa was the youngest of six children. After graduating from the University of Hawaiʻi at Mānoa in 1952 she began attending the Cranbrook Academy of Art in Bloomfield Hills, Michigan, where she studied weaving with Marianne Strengell and minored in ceramics with Maija Grotell. At Cranbrook she began a lifelong friendship with Toshiko Takaezu, a fellow artist born in Hawaiʻi. During one Christmas vacation she worked, briefly, winding warps for Jack Lenor Larsen in New York City.

=== Moving to New Mexico ===
After graduating from Cranbrook in 1954, she moved to Albuquerque, New Mexico to take up a position teaching ceramics and weaving in the art department at the University of New Mexico. There, she was exposed for the first time to American Indian - especially Navajo - and Mexican weaving and ceramics traditions. Under the influence of local weaving traditions, Kagawa began spinning her own yarns with wool from Las Vegas, New Mexico as well making her own dyes using local natural materials.

During that time she also spent time over the summer in Mexico, as well as studying ceramics with Marguerite Wildenhain at Pond Farm in Guerneville, California.

Kagawa met Allen Morgan Parrott on a visit with her students to the International Folk Art Museum in Santa Fe in 1956, where he was an assistant curator. They married the day after school ended that year, and she left her teaching position. The newly married couple moved into a four-room adobe home on Canyon Road in Santa Fe, where they lived for the rest of their lives, adopting two sons, Ben and Tim. That year, Kagawa opened one of the first shops for weaving and crafts in Santa Fe, called The Market. At first The Market was simply the living room of her home on Canyon Road; later she moved into a commercial space on Palace Avenue next to the Shed Restaurant.

One of her first commissions was to weave woolen ponchos for the ushers at the Santa Fe Opera.

In 1959 she applied for and received a grant from the Louis Comfort Tiffany Foundation that allowed her to travel to Mexico and Guatemala to study weaving and dyeing techniques in Oaxaca in Mexico and Quetzaltenango in Guatemala, among other places.

In 1958, her work was selected by influential curator Paul J. Smith for an American Craftsmen's Council [later renamed the American Craft Council] traveling exhibition called “Fibers, Tools, and Weaves.”

She had important exhibitions in the US and abroad, beginning in the late 50s, including “Modern American Wall Hangings” at the Victoria and Albert Museum in London in 1962–63.

In 1963 she had a solo exhibition at the Museum of Contemporary Crafts in New York City, later renamed the Museum of Art and Design.

In 1964 she participated in the New York World's Fair, representing the American Craftsmen's Council, where she met and befriended woodworker Sam Maloof, who went on to use her weavings in his furniture and wear wool shirts she'd woven for him.

For 9 months in 1971-72 she was an artist-in-residence in Puʻunēnē, Maui, where she taught workshops to local high school teachers. She also did several public commissions, including a large work titled "The Royal Cape" for the Maui Community College library as well as the Maui County Seal tapestry at the Maui County Council Chamber in Wailuku, Maui. In 2020, the Maui County Council adopted Resolution No. 20-18 to redisplay Parrott's Maui County Seal tapestry after it was removed for cleaning in 2019.

== Later years ==
In 1977 she became an American Craft Council Fellow.

In 1986 she was part of the "Legends in Fiber" show at the Octagon Center for the Arts in Amex, Iowa, together with Anni Albers and Sheila Hicks, Glen Kaufman, Lenore Tawney, and Ed Rossbach.

In 1994 she was in an exhibition at Maui Arts and Cultural Center, "To Soar to New Heights: Three Generations".

In 1996 she was one of twelve artists in an exhibition titled "Reflections: The Japanese American Master Artists of Hawaii" at the Japanese Cultural Center of Hawaiʻi.

Kagawa died in 2009.

== Public Collections ==
- Museum of Contemporary Crafts
- Victoria and Albert Museum
- Roswell Museum and Art Center
- Albuquerque Museum
