= Château d'Excideuil =

Château in Excideuil, France

Coordinates: 45°20′02″N 1°02′58″E

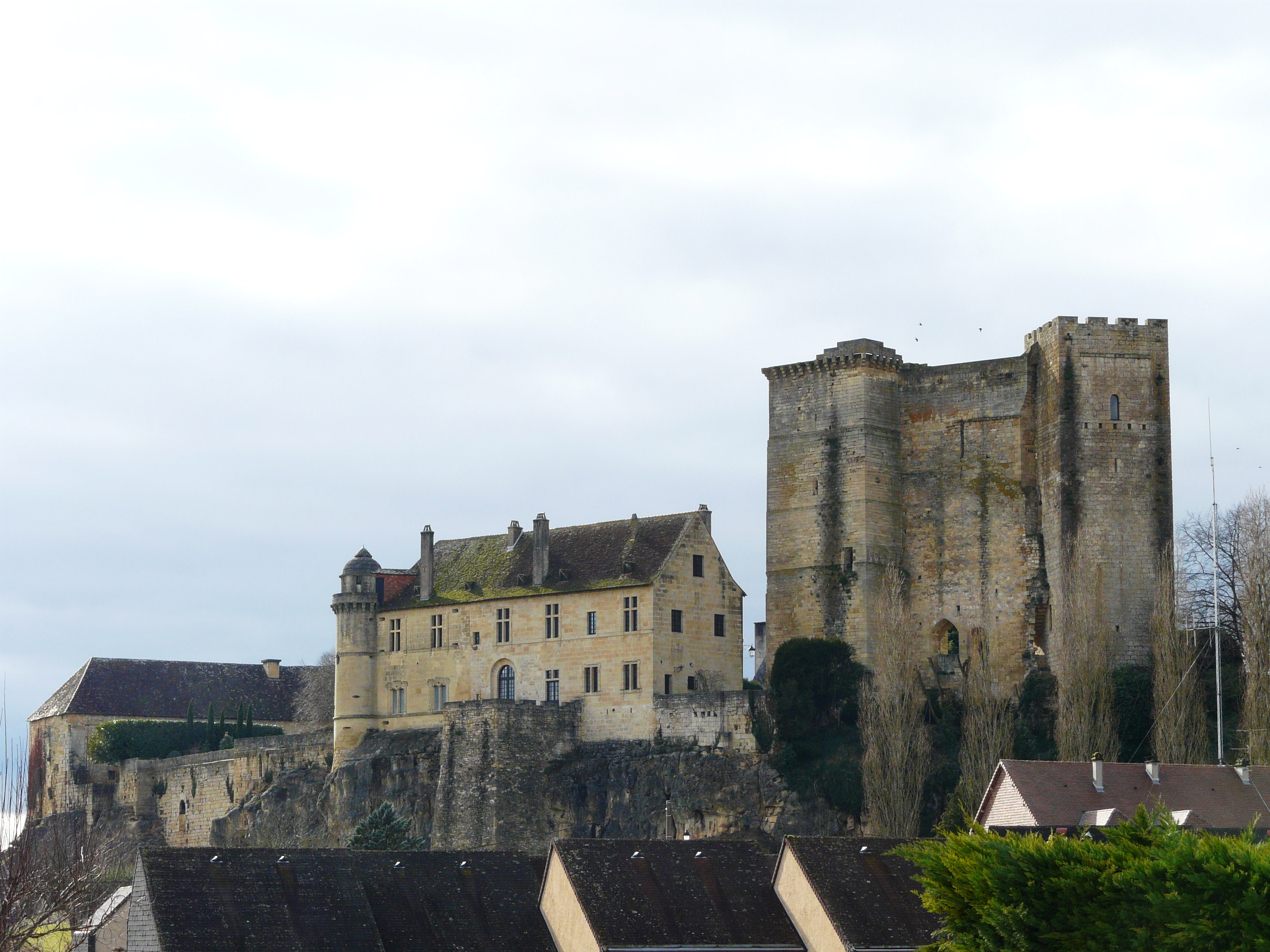

Château d'Excideuil is a château in Excideuil, Dordogne, Aquitaine, France.

== History ==
Starting in the eleventh and twelfth century, the viscounts of Limoges fortify the site by building a dungeon and walls to monitor the road from Limoges to Périgueux via Saint Yrieix .

Château d'Excideuil appears for the first time around 1100 in a deed of gift from Viscount Adémar to the abbey of Uzerche . Between 1037 and 1059, the bishop of Périgueux, fighting against the Count of Périgord, enfeoffs the Château d'Auberoche to the Viscount of Limoges; we can assume that the viscount's defense of Auberoche was possible only if Excideuil was already fortified.

Bernard Comborn, Dean of the oratory of St. Yrieix, uncle and guardian of Ademar V, had dispossessed him of the Château d'Excideuil. In 1176, he was forced to restore it to his nephew in exchange of Château Salon .

Attacked in 1182 and 1184 by British troops, led on one occasion by Richard the Lion Hearted, the castle resists. Following the betrayal of the Viscount of Limoges Adémar V in 1199, Jean sans Terre became master of several castles in the Viscounty. Viscount Gui V could not recover the castles of Aixe, Châlucet, Thiviers and Excideuil until 1210 - 1211 .

In 1303, the castle is visited by the King of France Philip le Bel, and the year after that by the future Pope Clement V. During the Hundred Years' War, after resisting an assault in 1346, it is subject to British occupation in 1351. Liberated in 1356 then returned to the English in 1360 under the Treaty of Bretigny, it is retaken by the troops of Du Guesclin in 1370 .

During the wars of religion, the castle, still under the domain of viscounts of Limoges, belongs to Jeanne d'Albret, on the side of the Catholics. In 1574, it passes into the hands of the Protestants who are expelled the following year .

In 1582, the Viscount of Limoges is none other than Henry III of Navarre, the future Henry IV. He sells the manor of Excideuil to the Earl François de Perusse des Cars.

In 1613, the castle is transferred to the family of Talleyrand-Périgord through marriage, and its land is promoted to marquisate.

Abandoned by new owners who transfer objects of value and furniture to their Chateau Chalais, in Charente, the castle begins its degradation. In 1883, Hélie Roger de Talleyrand-Périgord donates the Château d'Excideuil to the hospices of Chalais.

During the last quarter of the 20th century, the new owners, the Naudet family, undertake major renovation.
