= Jacky Fleming =

English cartoonist (born 1955)

- Born: 1955 (age 70–71); London, England
- Education: University of the Arts London; University of Leeds
- Known for: Cartoon
- Website: www.jackyfleming.co.uk

Jacky Fleming (born 1955, London) is an English cartoonist, whose work first became known through her pre-internet social activism postcards.

== Biography ==
Fleming studied a foundation course at the Chelsea School of Art, followed by a Fine Art degree at the University of Leeds. Her first published cartoon appeared in Spare Rib, and was a university essay for Professor Griselda Pollock which she handed in as a cartoon strip, and was about a girl trying to understand what society wants from her. Since then her work has featured in many books, exam papers, and publications which include The Guardian, The Independent, New Statesman, New Internationalist, Red Pepper, The Observer, Diva, You and Big Issue.

Fleming's book about Charles Darwin's theory of female inferiority was the winner of the Artemisia Humour prize for The Trouble with Women.

== Honors ==
Fleming's name is one of those featured on the sculpture Ribbons, unveiled in 2024.

== Bibliography ==
- The Trouble with Women, 2016.
- Demented, Bloomsbury, 2004
- Hello Boys, Penguin, 1996
- Dear Katie, Penguin, 1994
- Falling In Love, Penguin, 1993
- Never Give Up, Penguin, 1992
- Be A Bloody Train Driver, Penguin, 1991

== Exhibitions ==
- Panel Show, Sunny Bank Mills, Leeds, 2019
- Une BD si je veux, quand je veux!, Maison Fumetti, Nantes, France, 2018
- A Woman's Place, Abbey House Museum, Leeds, 2018
- A Woman's Work is Never Done, Quarry Bank Mill, Styal, 2017
- WOW - Women of the World Festival, Hull, March 2017 - "...commissioned portraits of Hull Trailblazers alongside work from her recent book the Trouble With Women.”
- Comix Creatrix: 100 Women Making Comics, House of Illustration, London, 5 Feb – 15 May 2016 - “The laughter panels, which included excerpts from Jacky Fleming's new book, 'The Trouble with Women' and Lizz Lunney's 'True Story', had many visitors chuckling out loud to themselves."
- Wish You Were Here? Artists postcards from 1960 to today, Arena Gallery, Birmingham, May 2015 – June 2016
- Washburne Heritage Centre, Fewston October 2014
- The Postcard is a Public Work of Art, X Marks the Bokship, Group Show, Bethnal Green, 2014
- Shrewsbury Cartoon Festival 2011
- Never Give Up, Bradford Playhouse, March 2009
- The Salt Gallery, Hayle, Cornwall, April 2007
- Fawcett's Funny Girls, London, Manchester, Glasgow 1997
- Pankhurst Trust, Manchester 1997
- London Comedy Festival, Riverside Studios, London 1994
- The Cutting Edge, Barbican Centre, London 1992
- Leeds City Art Gallery, 1992
- She Bites, Eastthorpe Gallery, Mirfield 1992
- Le Donne Ridono, Ferrara
