= Thomas Alexander Parrott =

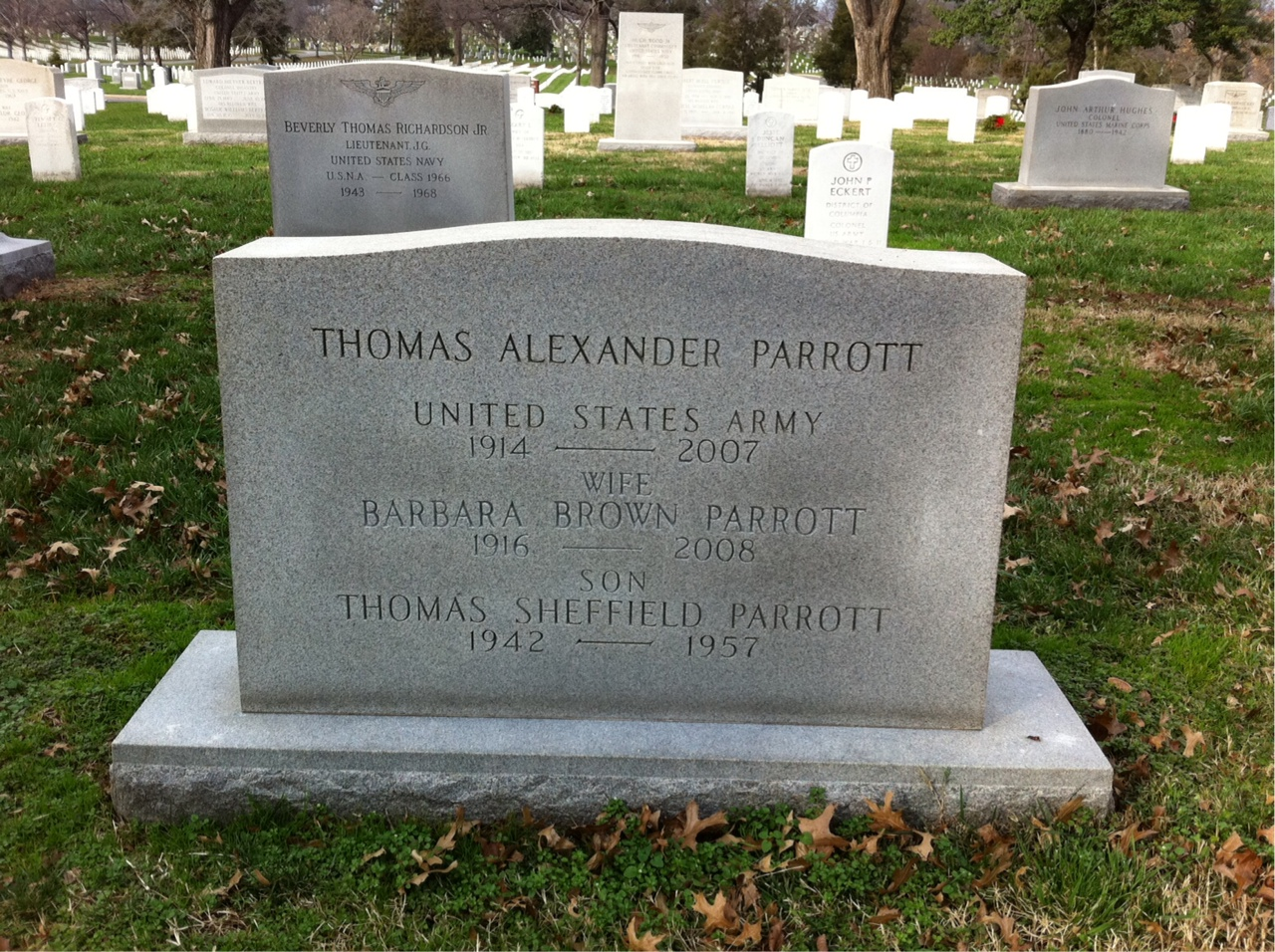
Grave at Arlington National Cemetery

Thomas Alexander Parrott (November 27, 1914 – June 14, 2007) was an American Central Intelligence Agency (CIA) officer.

== Personal ==
He was born at Fort Sam Houston in Texas, the son of Lt. Col. Roger Sheffield Parrott (1883 in Ohio – ?) and Mary B. Parrott (1884 in North Dakota – ?). He graduated from high school in Princeton, New Jersey, and then graduated from Princeton University in 1936. He died of a heart attack at his home in Washington, D.C.

== Military career ==
He served in the United States Army during World War II in North Africa and Italy, earning the Soldier's Medal and Legion of Merit, retiring as a colonel from the U.S. Army Reserve.

== CIA career ==
He served as Deputy Chief of the Soviet Division of the Clandestine Services Unit of the CIA, then as a base chief in Germany and then as assistant to Director Allen Dulles. In 1962 he was assigned to the White House during the Cuban Missile Crisis. He retired from the CIA in 1973.

== Family ==
He and wife Barbara had three children, son Tommy Parrott died in 1957 and daughters Cynthia and Susan.
