= Thomas H. Parrott =

- Born: 17 November 1836; Kent, England
- Died: 27 March 1899 (aged 62); Portland, Oregon, United States
- Genres: Brass band
- Occupation(s): Musician, businessman, landlord
- Instrument(s): Piano, violin, organ
- Years active: 1862–1899

Thomas Henry Parrott (17 October 1836 – 27 March 1899) was an English musician. He operated a music business in East Portland, Oregon, which was noted as energizing the community's business environment.

== Early life ==
Parrott was born in Kent, England, on 17 October 1836 to Samuel Henry Parrott and the former Maria Everest, both of England. His mother's family were notable musicians in England. In 1854, the Parrott family emigrated to the United States. They eventually settled down in Sherwood, Oregon. However, the family moved without Thomas H. Parrott, who stayed behind to study to become a shoe maker. Two years later, he came to Oregon and worked as a shoe maker.

== Music and business career ==
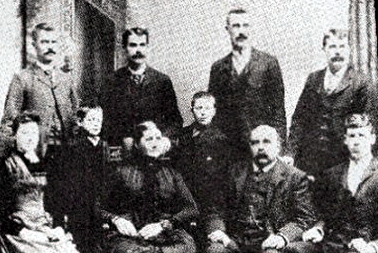
The Parrott family in Portland, Oregon, undated

In 1862, Parrott moved to East Portland, Oregon. For $40, Parrott purchased a home on the corner of Fourth and H street. He would go on to operate the business at that location for 30 years. It was noted in the book An Illustrated History of the State of Oregon that Parrott was instrumental in growing the business community of East Portland. He worked as a music teacher and played in many ballrooms across Portland. Parrott could play any musical instrument in a brass band. His specialties were the piano, violin, and organ. In 1889, Parrott opened another music store which featured different instruments, including hand-made pianos and cabinet organs. He also sold music sheets and instruction books. Another business venture of Parrotts was landlord. He rented out two farms in Yamhill County, Oregon.

== Personal life ==
On June 8, 1861, Parrott married the former Eliza A. Rhodes of Illinois, who was the daughter of pioneer A. Rhodes. Together they had eight children. All of their children had a thorough education in music. Two of his sons, Jiggs Parrott and Tom Parrott, went on to play Major League Baseball. Thomas H. Parrott was independent politically.
