= Léon Audé =

French politician

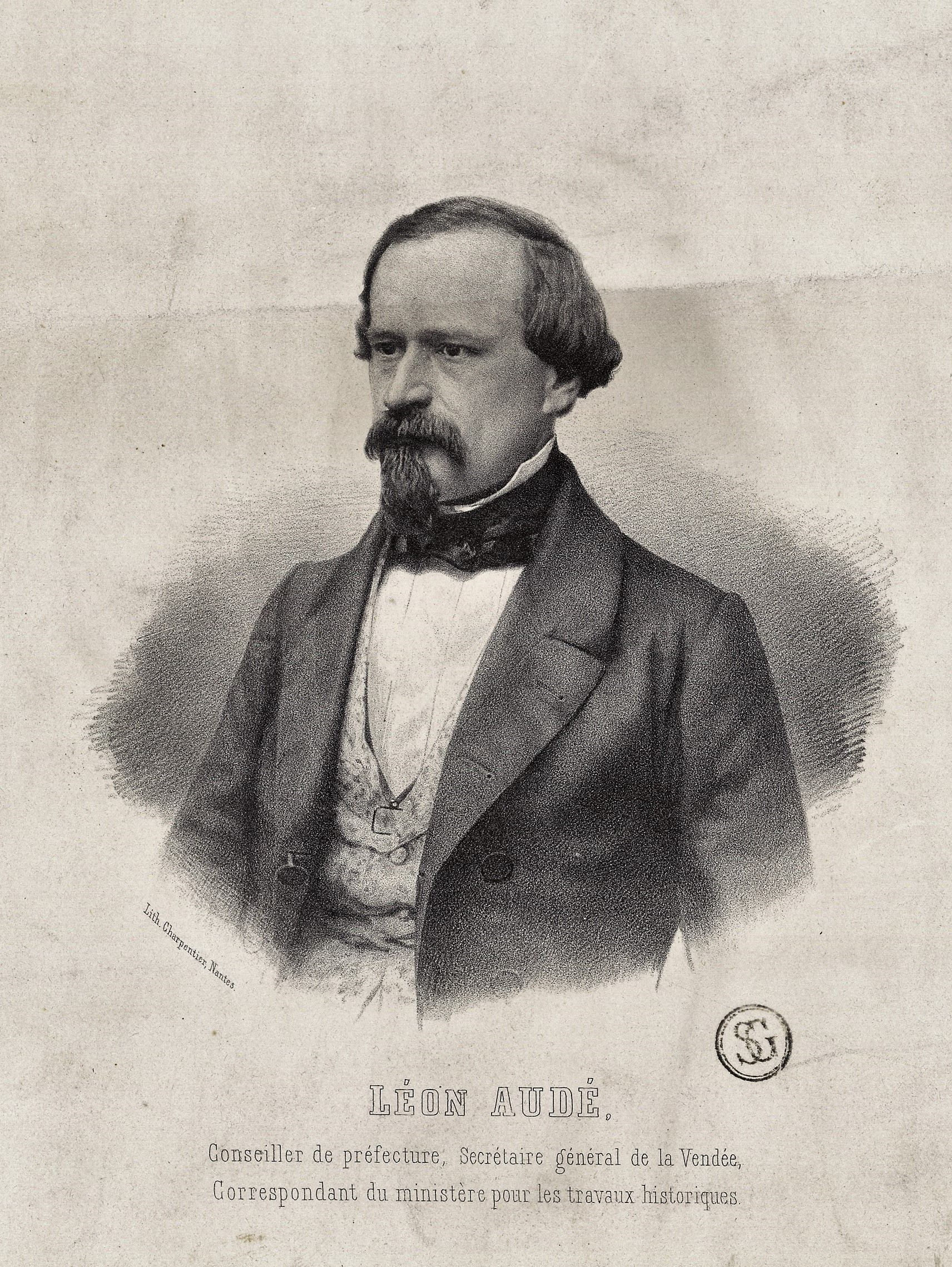
- Born: September 23, 1815; Réamur, France
- Died: October 26, 1870 (aged 55); Talmont Saint-Hilaire
- Occupation: Secretary General of the Vendée Prefecture
- Employer: Minister of National Education (France)

Léon Audé (September 23, 1815, in Réaumur – October 26, 1870, in the castle Granges Cathus, in Talmont-Saint-Hilaire), was a French politician, writer and local Vendéen historian.

== Life ==
He was the son of Pierre-Joseph Audé (1780-1855) et Marie-Jeanne-Émilie Landais (1787-1854).

He was mayor of the city Napoléon-Vendée (La Roche-sur-Yon under the Second Empire) from the 11th of August 1848 to the 24th of January 1852 and secretary general of the Prefecture of the Vendée.

He was a correspondent of the Ministry of National Education (France) for historical and archeological works' and a member of the scientific and historical society of Deux-Sèvres. From 1855 to 1861 he wrote a series of historical and administrative studies on the department, in the directories of the Société d'émulation de la Vendée.

He married Astélie Félicienne Paulet Bonnard on the 16th of September, 1845, in La Roche-sur-Yon.

== Bibliography ==
- French Republic. Liberty, Equality, Fraternity. News of the National Volunteers of the Vendée. Letter by Léon Audé, dated the 27 juin 1848 in Saumur et published as a poster by the prefect of the Vendée, François Grille. Napoléon-Vendée : printed by C. Leconte , (s. d.,), 1848.
- The Castle of the Granges-Cathus, near Talmond (Vendée), by Léon Audé, Napoléon-Vendée, printed by Ivonnet, 1854.
- Library catalogue of the city Napoléon-Vendée, by Léon Audé, Napoléon-Vendée, printed by C.-L. Ivonnet , 1857.
- Of the popular language of the Vendée, by Léon Audé, taken from the Yearbook of the Emulation Society, 1857. Napoléon-Vendée, printed by J. Sory, 1858.
- Family of Saligné, by Léon Audé Napoléon-Vendée, printed by Sory , 1858.
- M. le comte de Bagneux, by Léon Audé, taken from "Publisher" the 13 of February 1859, Napoléon-Vendée : printed by Vve Ivonnet, 1859.
- Account book of René Grignon, lord of La Pellissonnière, at the end of the 16th century, by Léon Audé, extracted from the Directory of the Emulation Society. 1860 Napoleon-Vendée. Printed by J. Sory, 1861.
- Durcot de La Roussière, baron de La Grève, by Léon Audé, Napoléon-Vendée, printed by J. Sory, 1862.
- The brochure Toulgoët and M. de Falloux in May 1869, by Léon Audé, Nantes, printed by V. Forest and E. Grimaud, 1869.
- La question des foires en Vendée, by Léon Audé, Nantes, printed by Forest, 1869.

== Sources ==
- Bibliothèque nationale de France, Léon Audé (1815-1870).
- Archives départementales de la Vendée, état civil de Réaumur, Léon-Firmin-Joseph Audé.

== See also ==
- Château de la Haute-Cour
- Monuments historiques in Vendée
