= Mathurin Jacques Brisson =

French zoologist and natural philosopher

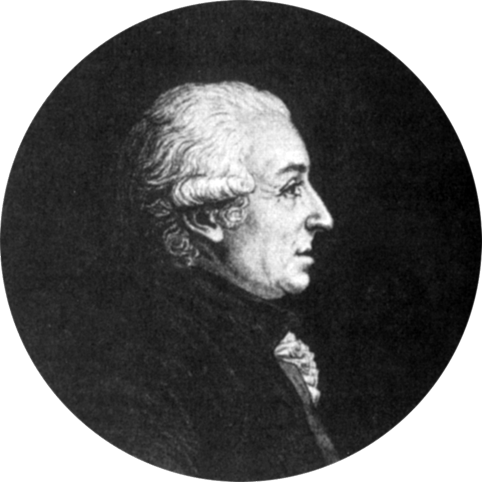
- Born: 30 April 1723; Fontenay-le-Comte, France
- Died: 23 June 1806 (aged 83); Croissy-sur-Seine, France
- Known for: Ornithologie
- Scientific career
- Fields: Zoology, ornithology, entomology
- Institutions: College of Navarre, Paris
- Author abbrev. (botany): Briss.
- Author abbrev. (zoology): Brisson

Mathurin Jacques Brisson (French pronunciation: [matyʁɛ̃ ʒak bʁisɔ̃]; 30 April 1723 – 23 June 1806) was a French zoologist and natural philosopher.

Brisson was born on 30 April 1723 at Fontenay-le-Comte in the Vendée department of western France. His parents wished him to take ecclesiastic orders, but in 1747, he abandoned his studies, and from 1749, was employed by the wealthy French naturalist René Antoine Ferchault de Réaumur as the curator of a large private collection of objects related to natural history that de Réaumur kept at his ancestral home at Réaumur in the Vendée.

Brisson became interested in the classification of animals and was influenced by the works of Carl Linnaeus and Jacob Theodor Klein. His book Le Règne animal was published in 1756, and the highly regarded six-volume work Ornithologie was published in 1760.

The English ornithologist Alfred Newton wrote of Brisson's Ornithologie that it was "a work of very great merit so far as it goes, for as a descriptive ornithologist the author stands even now unsurpassed; ...". For each species Brisson clearly indicated whether he had examined a specimen or whether he was relying on descriptions by other authors. Although in Brisson coined a Latin name for each bird species, these do not conform to the binomial system and are not recognised by the International Commission on Zoological Nomenclature (ICZN). However, Brisson also introduced names for genera and these are accepted by the ICZN. Linnaeus relied heavily on Brisson's work when updating his Systema Naturae for the twelfth edition in 1766. Linnaeus added 386 bird species of which 240 were based exclusively on Brisson.

De Réaumur died in 1757 and although in his will he left his large collection to the French Academy of Sciences, it was instead absorbed into the "Cabinet du roi", the royal natural history collection in Paris. Brisson abandoned zoology and in 1762 succeeded Jean-Antoine Nollet as professor of physics at the College of Navarre in Paris.

For a period of time, Brisson was an instructor of physical sciences and natural history to the family of the monarch. From 1759, he was a member of the Academy of Sciences.

A significant work involving the "specific weight of bodies" was his Pesanteur Spécifique des Corps published in 1787. In his investigations of electricity, Brisson was opposed to the theories of Priestley and Franklin.

He married Marie-Denise Foliot de Foucherolles on 24 April 1775. They had three children. He died on 23 June 1806 at Magny-les-Hameaux near Versailles.

== Publications ==
- Brisson, Mathurin Jacques (1756). Le règne animal divisé en IX classes, ou Méthode contenant la division générale des animaux (in French). Paris: Jean Baptiste Claude Bauche.
- —— (1760). Ornithologie, ou, Méthode Contenant la Division des Oiseaux en Ordres, Sections, Genres, Especes & leurs Variétés (6 volumes and supplement) (in French and Latin). Paris: Jean-Baptiste Bauche. With uncoloured engraved illustrations by François-Nicolas Martinet.
- —— (1769). Lettres de deux Espagnols sur les manufactures (in French). A Vergera.
- —— (1781). Dictionnaire raisonné de physique (3 Volumes) (in French). Paris: Leboucher, Lamy. Volume 1, Volume 2, Volume 3.
- —— (1784). Observations sur les nouvelles découvertes aérostatiques et sur la probabilité de pouvoir diriger les ballons (in French). Paris: Le Boucher.
- —— (1787). Pesanteur spécifique des corps. Ouvrage utile à l'histoire naturelle, à la physique, aux arts et au commerce (in French). Paris: L'Imprimerie Royale.
- —— (1789). Traité élémentaire, ou principes de physique. Fondés sur les connoissances les plus certaines, tant anciennes que modernes, & confirmés par l'expérience (3 Volumes) (in French). Paris: Moutard. Volume 1, Volume 2, Volume 3.
- Trattato elementare ovvero Principi di fisica. Grazioli, Florenz 1791.
- Die spezifischen Gewichte der Körper. Leipzig 1795.
- Suplemento al Diccionario universal de física. Cano, Madrid 1796–1802.
- —— (1797). Principes élémentaires de l'histoire naturelle et chymique des substances minérales (in French). Paris: Fermin Didot.
- Anfangsgründe der Naturgeschichte und Chemie der Mineralien. Mainz 1799.
- Instruction sur les nouveaux poids et mesures. Paris 1799.
- —— (1800). Élémens ou principes physico-chymiques, destinés à servir de suite aux principes de physique; à l'usage des écoles centrales (in French). Paris: Bossange, Masson et Besson.
- Elements of the natural history and chymical analysis of mineral substances. Ritchie, Walker, Vernor & Hood, London 1800.
- Tratado elemental ó principios de física. Madrid 1803/04.
