= Paul Caillaud =

French pharmacist and politician

Member of the National Assembly for Vendée's 1st constituency
- In office 1967–1981
- Preceded by: Lionel de Tinguy du Pouët
- Succeeded by: Philippe Mestre

Mayor of La Roche-sur-Yon
- In office 1961–1977
- Preceded by: André Boutelier
- Succeeded by: Jacques Auxiette

Personal details
- Born: 14 September 1917 La Copechagnière, Vendée, France
- Died: 15 August 2008 (aged 90) La Roche-sur-Yon, France
- Party: Union for French Democracy (1978–1981)
- Other political affiliations: Independent Republicans (1962–1978)
- Relatives: Dominique Caillaud (nephew)

Paul Caillaud (14 September 1917 – 15 August 2008) was a French pharmacist and politician. He represented the Independent Republicans (from 1962 to 1978) and the Union for French Democracy (from 1978 to 1981) in the National Assembly. He was the mayor of La Roche-sur-Yon from 1961 to 1977.

== Political career ==
On 16 December 1961, Caillaud was elected mayor of La Roche-sur-Yon. He remained in this position until 14 March 1977, when Socialist Party candidate Jacques Auxiette became mayor.

In 1967, he was elected to Vendée at the expense of incumbent Lionel de Tinguy du Pouët. He was reelected in 1968 in 1973 and 1978. He first served under the label of the Independent Republicans before joining the Union for French Democracy in 1978. Candidate in 1981 as an alternate to Philippe Mestre, he then left the French National Assembly.

His brother, Martial Caillaud, was mayor of L'Herbergement from 1965 to 1987 and general counsel of canton de Rocheservière of 1973 to 1987.

His nephew Dominique Caillaud, son of the former, was mayor of Saint-Florent-des-Bois of 1977 to 2008, General Council of Vendée from 1988 to 2001, and a member of the second district of Vendee from 1997 to 2012.

== Awards ==
- Chevalier of the Legion of Honour
