= Les Châtelliers-Châteaumur =

- Part of Sèvremont
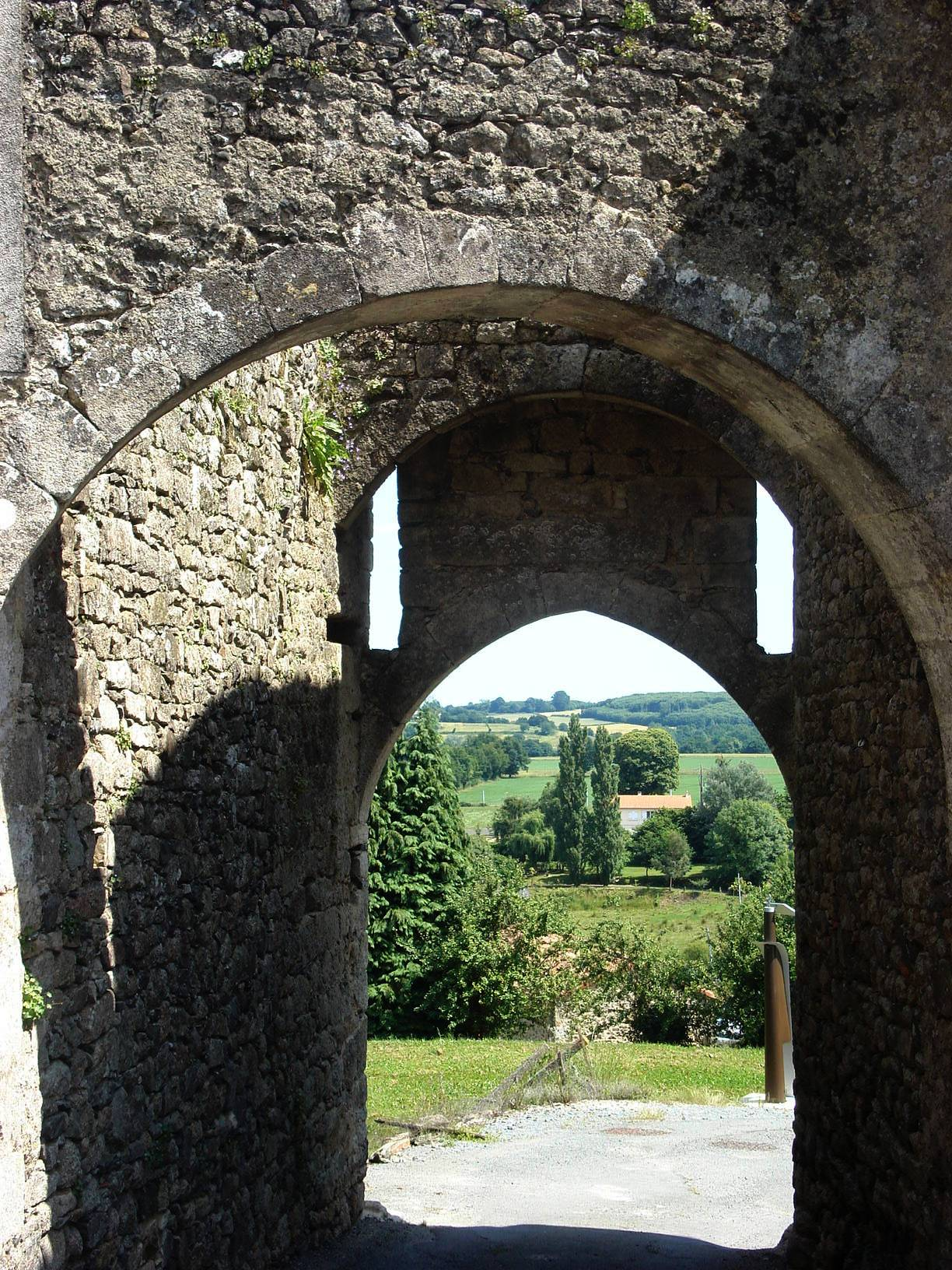
- The entrance of the Châteaumur Keep

- Coat of arms
- Location of Les Châtelliers-Châteaumur
- Location within France Location within Pays de la Loire
- Coordinates: 46°51′20″N 0°49′07″W
- Country: France
- Region: Pays de la Loire
- Department: Vendée
- Arrondissement: Fontenay-le-Comte
- Canton: Les Herbiers
- Commune: Sèvremont
- Area^{1}: 18.13 km^{2} (7.00 sq mi)
- Highest elevation: 240 m (790 ft)
- Lowest elevation: 134 m (440 ft)
- Population (2022): 774
  - Density: 42.7/km^{2} (111/sq mi)
- Time zone: UTC+01:00 (CET)
  - Summer (DST): UTC+02:00 (CEST)
- Postal code: 85700
- ^{1} French Land Register data, which excludes lakes, ponds, glaciers > 1 km^{2} (0.386 sq mi or 247 acres) and river estuaries.

Les Châtelliers-Châteaumur (French pronunciation: [le ʃatəlje ʃatomyʁ]) is a former commune of the Vendée department in the Pays de la Loire region in western France. On 1 January 2016, it was merged into the new commune of Sèvremont.

== See also ==
- Communes of the Vendée department
