= Jean de Tinguy du Pouët =

French politician

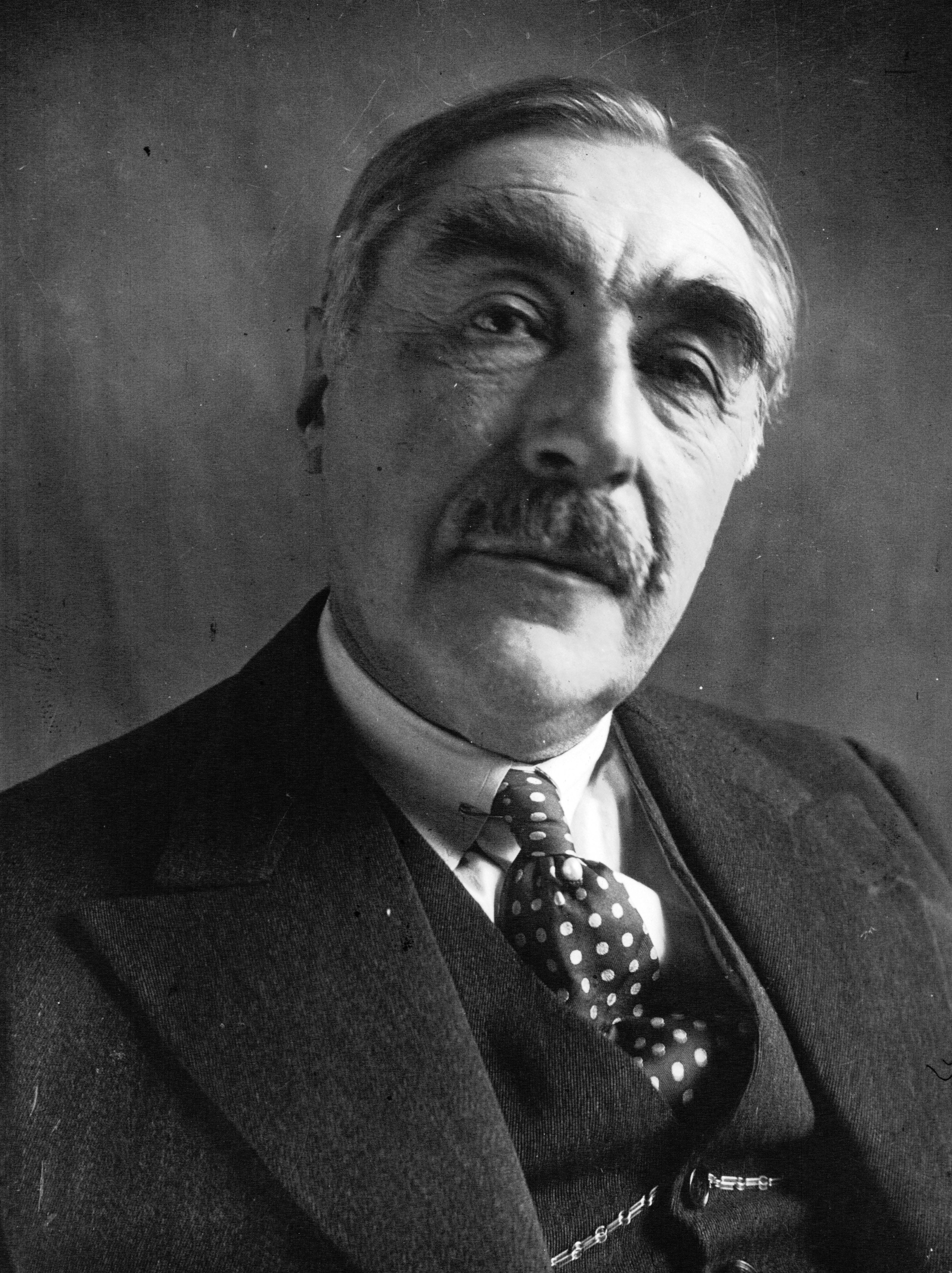
- Born: 23 March 1875; Saint-Michel-Mont-Mercure, Vendée, France
- Died: 5 December 1951 (aged 76); Paris 16ème, France
- Education: Sciences Po
- Occupation: Politician
- Children: Lionel de Tinguy du Pouët

Jean de Tinguy du Pouët (23 March 1875 – 5 December 1951) was a French politician. He entered Council of State in 1900 and was Master of Requests at the Council of State.

He is known for having voted the full powers to Maréchal Pétain and for being ineligible after the Liberation where he had to cease all political activity.

== Early life ==
Jean de Tinguy du Pouët was born on 23 March 1875 in Saint-Michel-Mont-Mercure, Vendée, France. He graduated from Sciences Po and earned a doctorate in Laws in 1899.

Tinguy served in the French Army during World War I, and he was awarded the Croix de Guerre and the Legion of Honour for it.

He married Andrée Fernande Ricard in Paris 8th district on July 30, 1907, with whom they had 5 children, including Lionel, Armand, Monique.

== Career ==
Tinguy was the mayor of Saint-Michel-Mont-Mercure from 1901 to 1939. He served as a member of the Chamber of Deputies representing Vendée from 1919 to 1942.

He entered the Council of State in 1900 and became a Councilor of State. He is Master of Requests at the Council of State.

In 1904, he became mayor of Saint-Michel-Mont-Mercure, a position he retained until 1944.

In 1930, he was elected general councilor of the canton of Pouzauges, then president of the general council in 1936. During the Occupation, he chaired the administrative commission then the departmental council which replaced the general council.

He was deputy of Vendée from 1919 to 1942, and sits in the group of the Republican Democratic Union. Specialist of finances, he was vice-chairman of the finance committee from 1932 to 1940.

On July 10, 1940, he voted the full powers to Maréchal Pétain. Ineligible after the Liberation, he then ceased all political activity.

His son, Comte Lionel de Tinguy du Pouet took over in 1945 as mayor of Saint-Michel-Mont-Mercure, then as deputy of Vendée in 1946.

His grandson, Comte Louis Monfort de Tinguy du Pouet also took over as mayor of Saint-Michel-Mont-Mercure from 1981 to 1989, then became general councilor of the canton of Pouzauges from 1981 to 1994.

== Death ==
Tinguy died on December 5, 1951, in Paris 16th district at the age of 76.
