= Réaumur (disambiguation) =

Réaumur can refer to:

- René Antoine Ferchault de Réaumur, a French scientist of the early 18th century
- Réaumur scale, proposed in 1731 by de Réaumur
- Réaumur, Vendée, a commune in the Vendée département of France
- Réaumur (crater), the remains of a lunar impact crater on the southern edge of Sinus Medii
