= La Pommeraye =

La Pommeraye is the name or part of the name of several communes in France:

- La Pommeraye, Maine-et-Loire, in the Maine-et-Loire département
- La Pommeraye, Calvados, in the Calvados département
- La Pommeraie-sur-Sèvre, in the Vendée département
