= Army of Naples =

Army of Naples or Neapolitan army may refer to:

- Army of the Two Sicilies (1734–1806), which included the Kingdom of Naples
- Army of Naples (France), a field army of the First French Republic (1799)
- Army of the Kingdom of Naples (Napoleonic) (1806–1815)
