= 2004 Pays de la Loire regional election =

| ← 1998 | 21 March 2004 (first round); 28 March 2004 (second round) | 2010 → |
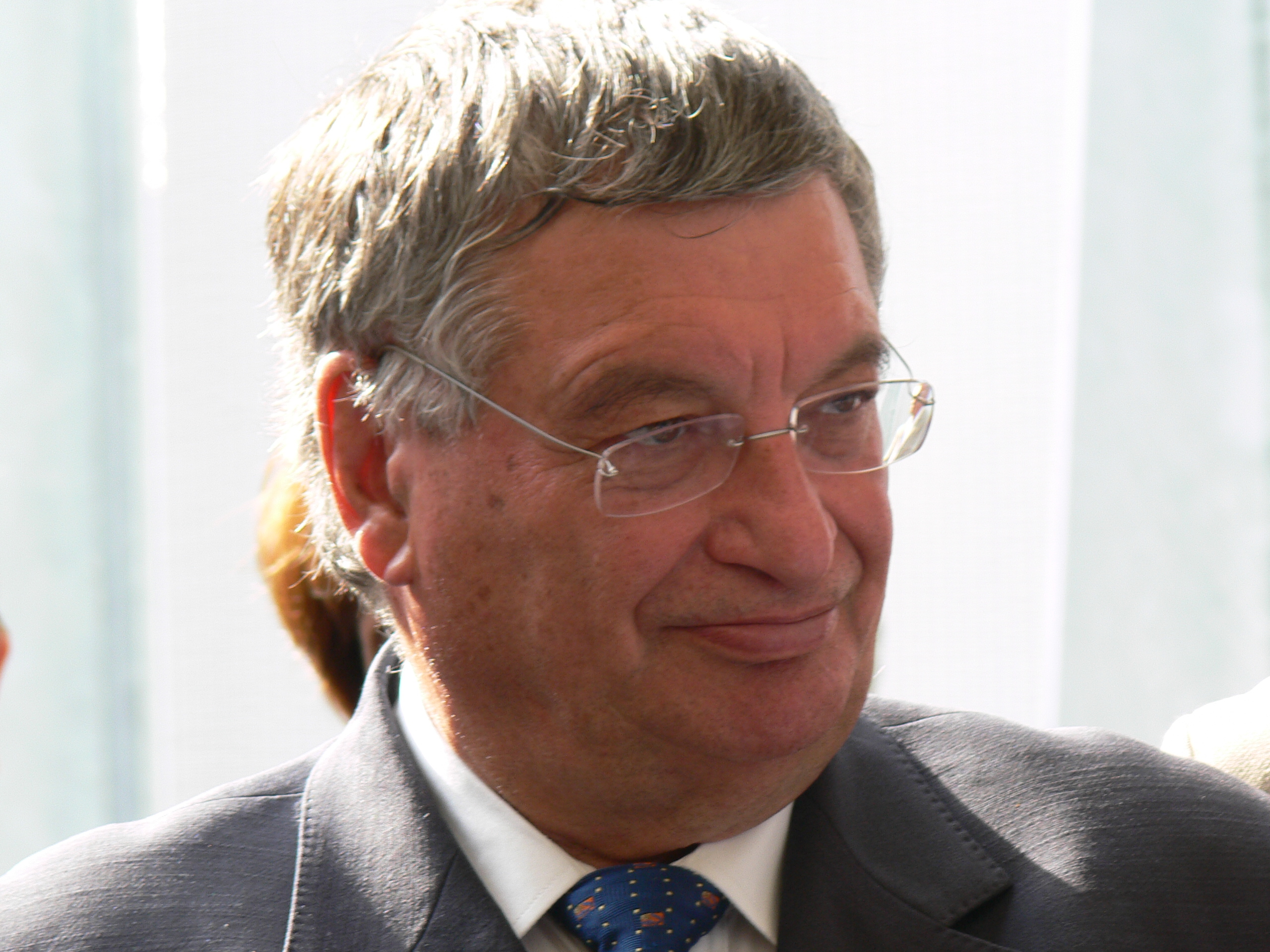

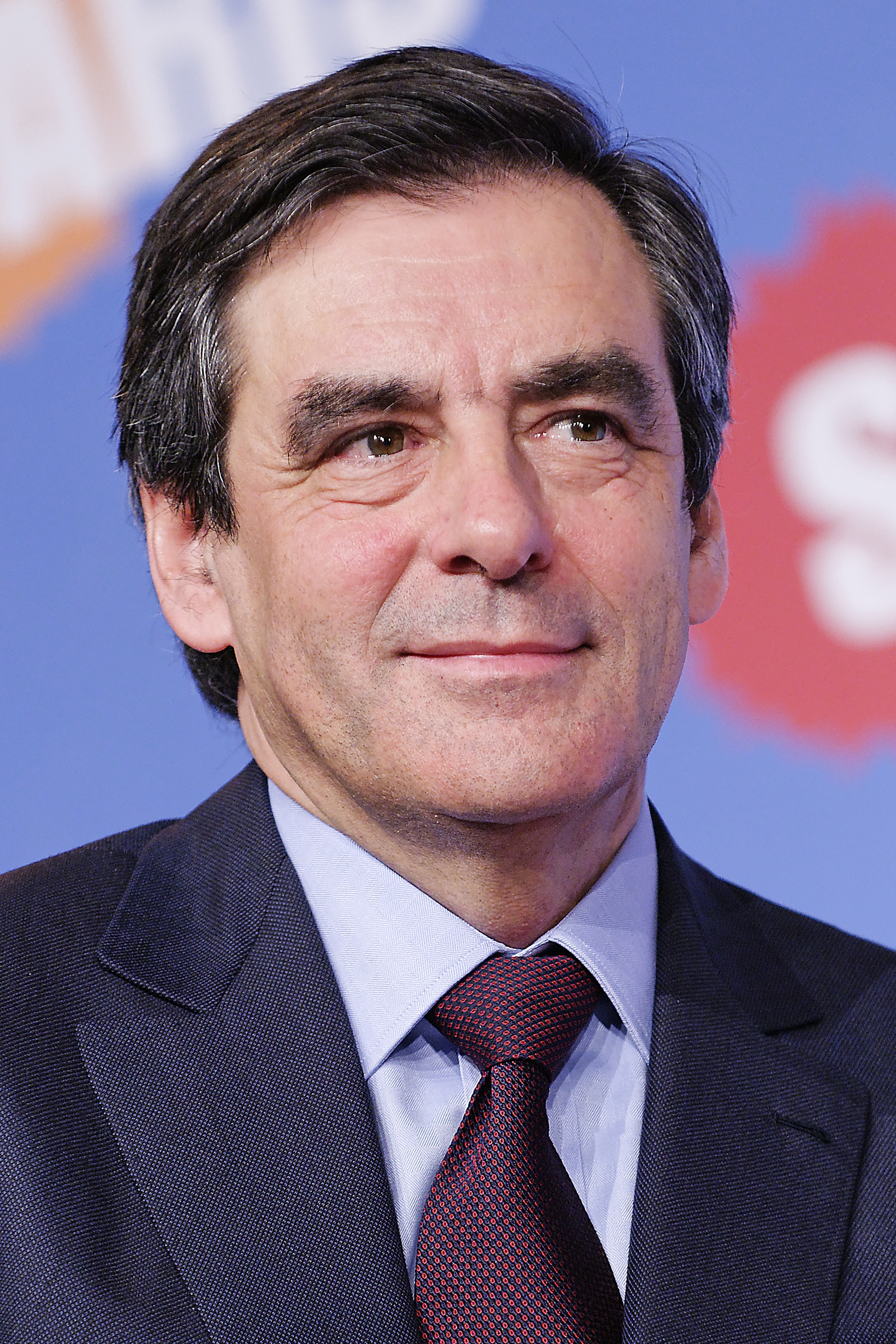
| | First party | Second party |
|---|---|---|
| Leader | Jacques Auxiette | François Fillon |
| Party | PS | UMP |
| Seats won | 60 | 33 |
| Popular vote | 762,566 | 694,049 |
| Percentage | 52.35% | 47.65% |

A regional election took place in the region of Pays de la Loire on March 21 and March 28, 2004, along with all other regions. Jacques Auxiette (PS) was elected President of the Council.

== Results ==
| Party | Presidential candidate | First round | | Second round | | Seats |
| Party | Presidential candidate | Votes | % | Votes | % | Seats |
|---|---|---|---|---|---|---|
| Socialist Party | Jacques Auxiette | 518,475 | 37.20 | 762,566 | 52.35 | 60 |
| Union for a Popular Movement | François Fillon | 450,560 | 32.33 | 694,049 | 47.65 | 33 |
| Union for French Democracy–Cap21 | Jean Arthuis | 169,254 | 12.14 | | | 0 |
| National Rally | Samuel Maréchal | 135,390 | 9.71 | | | 0 |
| LO/LCR | Yves Chèere | 84,567 | 6.07 | | | 0 |
| National Republican Movement | Paul Petitdidier | 35,473 | 2.55 | | | 0 |
| Total | | 1,393,719 | 100.00 | 1,456,615 | 100.00 | 93 |
| Valid votes | | 1,393,719 | 94.00 | 1,456,615 | 95.25 | |
| Invalid/blank votes | | 89,037 | 6.00 | 72,646 | 4.75 | |
| Total votes | | 1,482,756 | 100.00 | 1,529,261 | 100.00 | |
| Registered voters/turnout | | 2,396,563 | 61.87 | 2,396,096 | 63.82 | |
Source: Ministry of the Interior, Delwit
