= Charles-Auguste Bonnamy =

French army officer (1764–1830)

- Born: 18 August 1764; Maillezais (Vendée), Kingdom of France
- Died: 7 August 1830 (aged 65); La Flocellière (Vendée)
- Military career
- Allegiance: France
- Branch: Cavalry
- Rank: Lieutenant general
- Conflicts: See list: French Revolutionary Wars; War of the First Coalition; Siege of Maastricht; War in the Vendée; Battle of Mainz; Battle of Limburgh; War of the Second Coalition; Battle of Messkirch; Battle of Marengo; Napoleonic Wars; French invasion of Russia; Battle of Borodino
- Awards: Legion of Honour; Order of Saint Louis; Names inscribed under the Arc de Triomphe (Column 40)

Charles-Auguste Bonnamy (Note: Courcelles (1821, p. 405) gives Bonnamy's first names as Auguste-Jean-Baptiste-Louis-Joseph, while Chassin (1892) gives them as Charles-Auguste-Jean-Baptiste-Louis-Joseph.) (Note: Also spelled Bonamy by English-speaking historians.) (18 August 1764 – 7 August 1830) was a French cavalry commander who rose to the rank of general during the First French Empire.

== Early life ==
After having been one of the first volunteers to enlist in the newly raised Vendée Battalion of Volunteers, where he was promoted to corporal, in 1790 Bonnamy went on to join the Army of the North's Royal-Lorraine Cavalry Regiment, where he was promoted to sub-lieutenant.

== War of the First Coalition ==
Having served under Dumouriez, (Note: Possibly as part of Dumouriez's Army of the North's victory at Valmy (September 1792) and the subsequent expedition into the Austrian Netherlands which resulted in another victory at Jemappes (November 1792) before being defeated at Neerwinden (March 1793).) following that general's defection to the Army of the Holy Roman Empire in 1793, Bonnamy went on to serve on the general staff of Dumouriez' successor, Dampierre, before returning to his country to fight against the royalists in the counter-revolutionary uprising of the War in the Vendée in that region.

He then went, in 1794, as adjutant general to General Marceau, to the newly created département of Sambre-et-Meuse.

In October 1795, now as chief of staff to Jean-Baptiste Kléber, Bonnamy distinguished himself at the Battle of Mainz. Following the Battle of Limburgh (September 1796) he was by Marceau's side when this general was mortally wounded while conducting a successful rear guard action near Altenkirchen.

== War of the Second Coalition ==
Following his acquittal by a military court, of a disproven charge of treason that had kept him retired from active duty for two years, by 1798, Bonnamy had transferred to the Army of Naples, whose commander-in-chief, Jean-Étienne Championnet promoted him to brigadier general the day French Revolutionary Army entered Rome (December 1798).

In 1799 (an VIII), Bonnamy published A quick look at the operations of the Naples Campaign until the entry of the French into this city, by Brigadier General Bonnamy, Chief of the General Staff of the Army of Naples, Paris, Dentu, year VIII, (Note: Coup d'œil rapide sur les opérations de la Campagne de Naples jusqu' à l'entrée des Français dans cette ville, par le général de brigade Bonnamy chef de l'État-Major-Général de l'Armée de Naples, Paris, Dentu, an VIII.) in response to which General Francesco Pignatelli, an Italian general also serving under Championnet, published an Additional historical overview of General Bonnamy's memoir on the war between the French Republic and the King of Naples and on the revolution which followed it .... (Note: Aperçu historique complémentaire du mémoire du général Bonnamy sur la guerre entre la République française et le roi de Naples et sur la révolution qui en fut la suite, par François Pignatelli général de brigade italien.)

By December 1799, Bonnamy was leading one of the two brigades, the other being the infantry brigade led by Bonet, in Ney's division of Saint-Cyr's Centre Corps of the Army of the Rhine and Moselle under General Moreau. At the beginning of the 1800 campaign, the brigade was formed by the 569 men and horse of the 8th Chasseur a Cheval Regiment. He would still be doing so in May of that year, when Ney's division was expanded to also include Joba's brigade.

== Napoleonic Wars ==
On 1 August 1812, Bonnamy's 3rd Brigade appears listed under General Morand's 1st Division, which formed part of Maréchal Davout's I Corps. The 3rd Brigade was then made up of the 30th Line Regiment, numbering 3,725 infantry troops plus 93 horse and an artillery company of four guns, and the 2nd Baden Regiment, numbering 1,343 infantry plus 45 horse and an artillery company of two guns. By the middle of that same month, the Brigade had been reduced to just the 30th Line Regiment of 3,176 infantry troops plus 83 horse and an artillery company of five guns.

At the Battle of Borodino, under Morand's 1st Division, Bonnamy still headed the 3rd Brigade, with its 30th Line Regiment now consisting of 3,008 infantry and 78 cavalry, and was able to rush the earthworks and penetrate the embrasures to take the Raevsky redoubt. This action was, however, short-lived and, with the ensuing counterattack on three sides, the brigade was decimated, with infantry losses of over 90% and cavalry losing more than a quarter of its number, Bonnamy was severely wounded in the hand-to-hand combat and taken prisoner. Although originally considered dead, he in fact remained in captivity until 1814.

On his return to France, he was awarded both the Legion of Honour and the Order of Saint Louis at the same time (October 1814).

He was promoted to lieutenant general in January 1815.

== See also ==
- List of French generals of the Revolutionary and Napoleonic Wars
