= Saint-Michel-Mont-Mercure =

- Part of Sèvremont
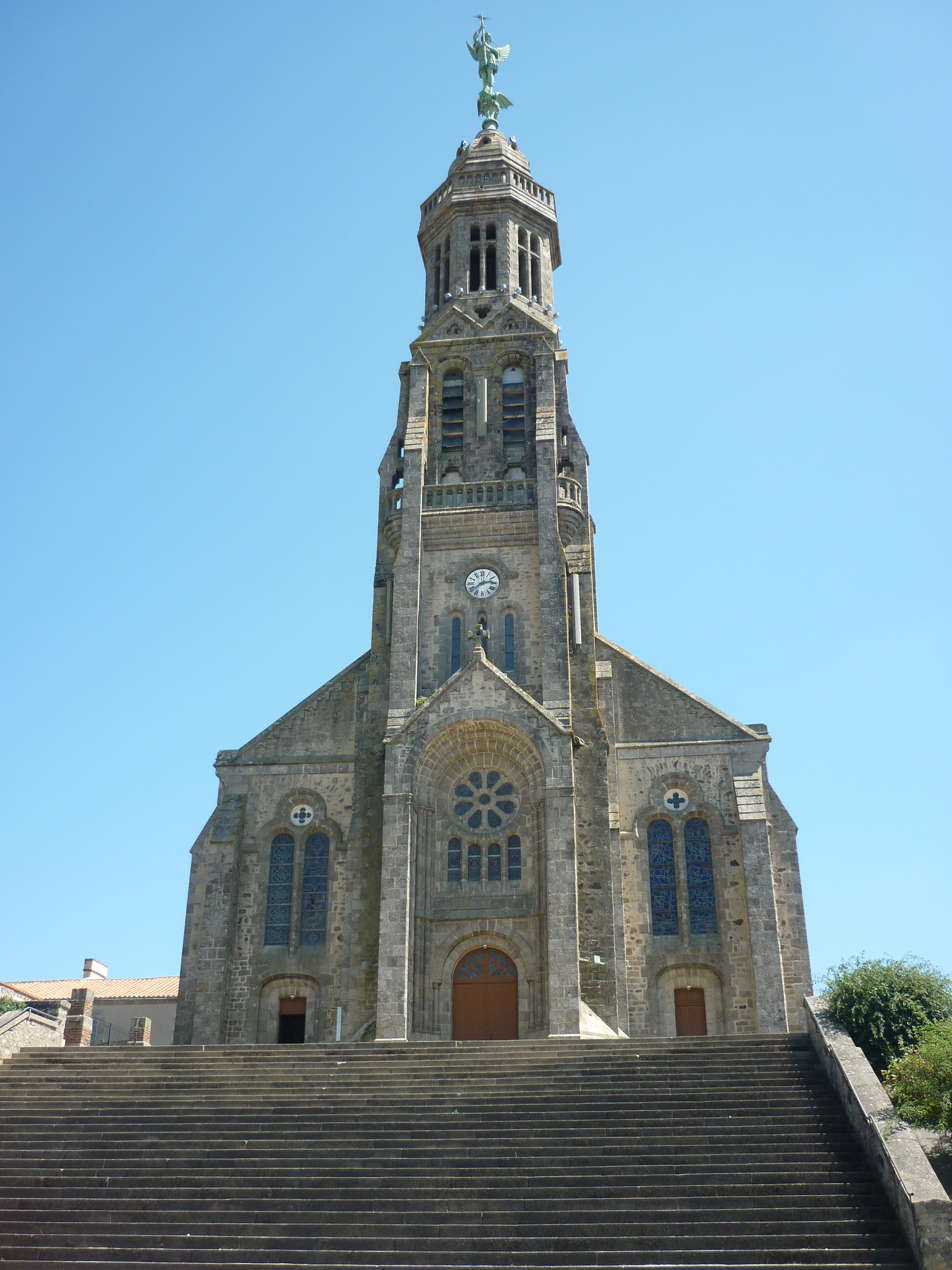
- The church in Saint-Michel-Mont-Mercure
- Location of Saint-Michel-Mont-Mercure
- Location within France Location within Pays de la Loire
- Coordinates: 46°49′51″N 0°52′54″W
- Country: France
- Region: Pays de la Loire
- Department: Vendée
- Arrondissement: Fontenay-le-Comte
- Canton: Les Herbiers
- Commune: Sèvremont
- Area^{1}: 25.76 km^{2} (9.95 sq mi)
- Highest elevation: 290 m (950 ft)
- Lowest elevation: 119 m (390 ft)
- Population (2022): 2,048
  - Density: 79.50/km^{2} (205.9/sq mi)
- Time zone: UTC+01:00 (CET)
  - Summer (DST): UTC+02:00 (CEST)
- Postal code: 85700
- ^{1} French Land Register data, which excludes lakes, ponds, glaciers > 1 km^{2} (0.386 sq mi or 247 acres) and river estuaries.

Saint-Michel-Mont-Mercure (French pronunciation: [sɛ̃ miʃɛl mɔ̃ mɛʁkyʁ]) is a former commune in the Vendée department in the Pays de la Loire region in western France. On 1 January 2016, it was merged into the new commune of Sèvremont.

== See also ==
- Communes of the Vendée department
