= La Pommeraie-sur-Sèvre =

- Part of Sèvremont
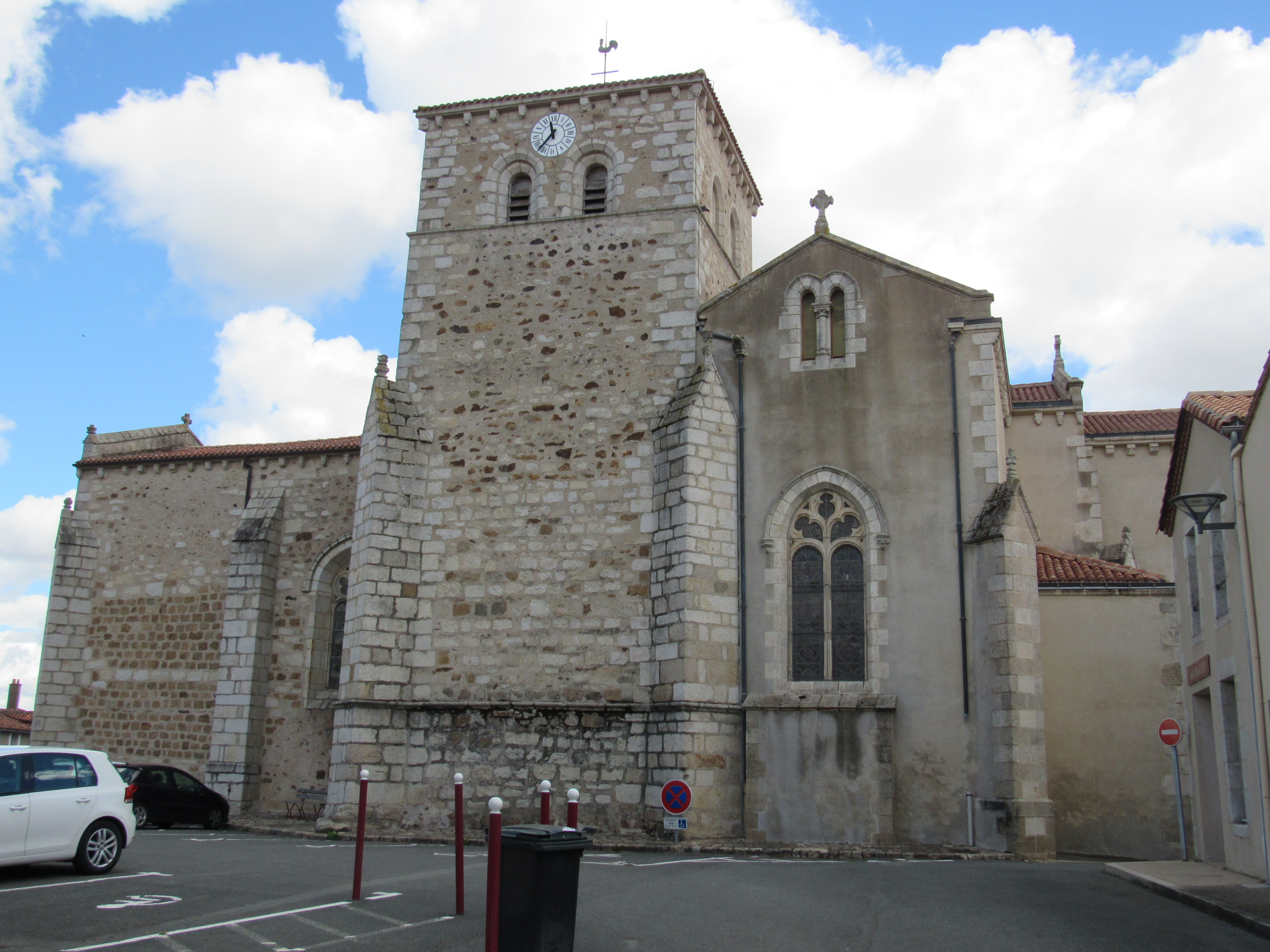

- Coat of arms
- Location of La Pommeraie-sur-Sèvre
- Location within France Location within Pays de la Loire
- Coordinates: 46°50′17″N 0°46′27″W
- Country: France
- Region: Pays de la Loire
- Department: Vendée
- Arrondissement: Fontenay-le-Comte
- Canton: Les Herbiers
- Commune: Sèvremont
- Area^{1}: 15.56 km^{2} (6.01 sq mi)
- Highest elevation: 212 m (696 ft)
- Lowest elevation: 140 m (460 ft)
- Population (2022): 987
  - Density: 63.4/km^{2} (164/sq mi)
- Time zone: UTC+01:00 (CET)
  - Summer (DST): UTC+02:00 (CEST)
- Postal code: 85700
- ^{1} French Land Register data, which excludes lakes, ponds, glaciers > 1 km^{2} (0.386 sq mi or 247 acres) and river estuaries.

La Pommeraie-sur-Sèvre (French pronunciation: [la pɔmʁɛ syʁ sɛvʁ], literally La Pommeraie on Sèvre) is a former commune in the Vendée department in the Pays de la Loire region in western France. On 1 January 2016, it was merged into the new commune of Sèvremont.

== See also ==
- Communes of the Vendée department
