= La Flocellière =

- Part of Sèvremont
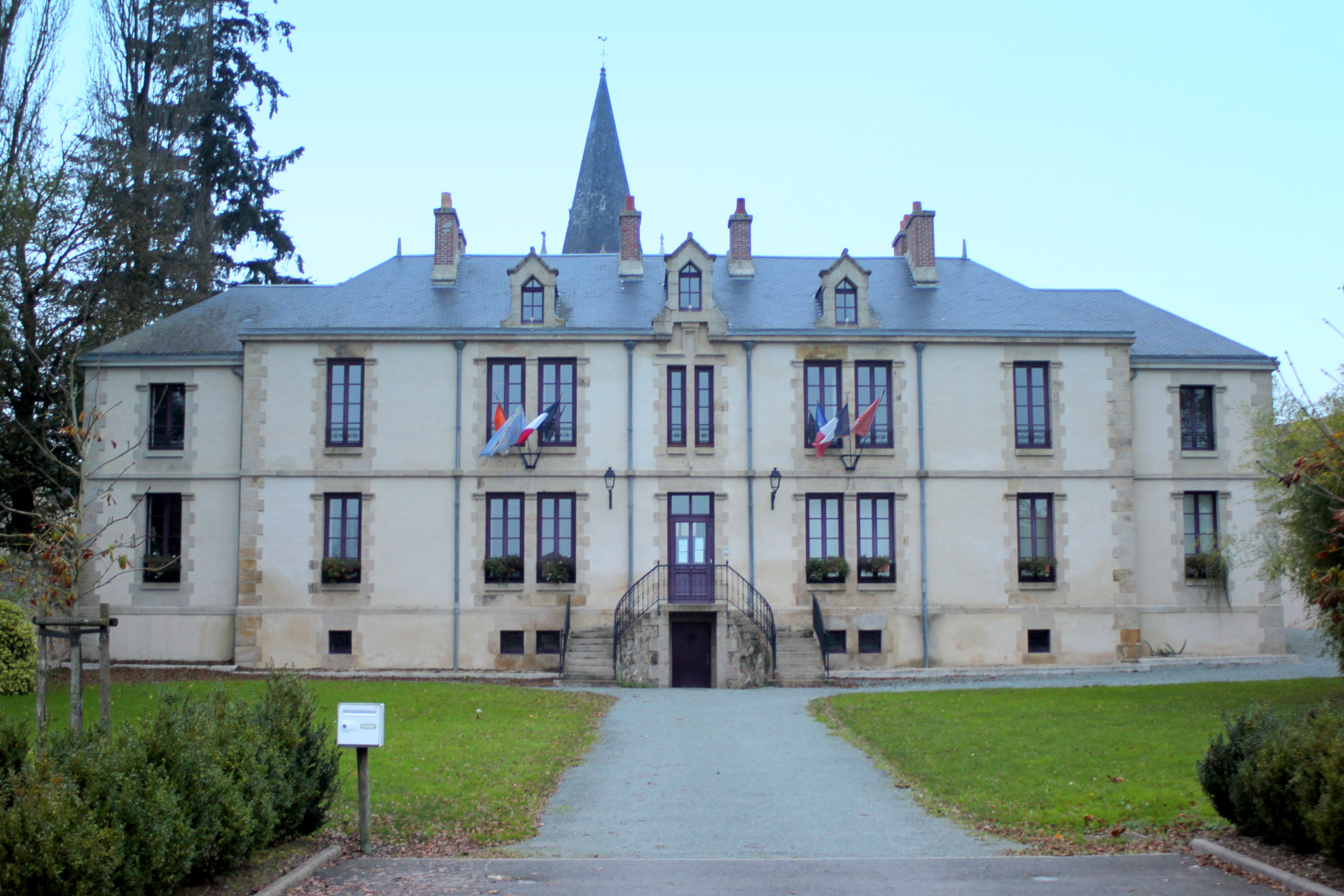
- The town hall in La Flocellière

- Coat of arms
- Location of La Flocellière
- Location within France Location within Pays de la Loire
- Coordinates: 46°49′59″N 0°51′34″W
- Country: France
- Region: Pays de la Loire
- Department: Vendée
- Arrondissement: Fontenay-le-Comte
- Canton: Les Herbiers
- Commune: Sèvremont
- Area^{1}: 29.19 km^{2} (11.27 sq mi)
- Highest elevation: 272 m (892 ft)
- Lowest elevation: 99 m (325 ft)
- Population (2022): 2,592
  - Density: 88.80/km^{2} (230.0/sq mi)
- Time zone: UTC+01:00 (CET)
  - Summer (DST): UTC+02:00 (CEST)
- Postal code: 85700
- ^{1} French Land Register data, which excludes lakes, ponds, glaciers > 1 km^{2} (0.386 sq mi or 247 acres) and river estuaries.

La Flocellière (French pronunciation: [la flɔsəljɛʁ]) is a former commune in the Vendée department in the Pays de la Loire region in western France. On 1 January 2016, it was merged into the new commune of Sèvremont.

== See also ==
- Communes of the Vendée department
