= Sèvremont =

- Commune
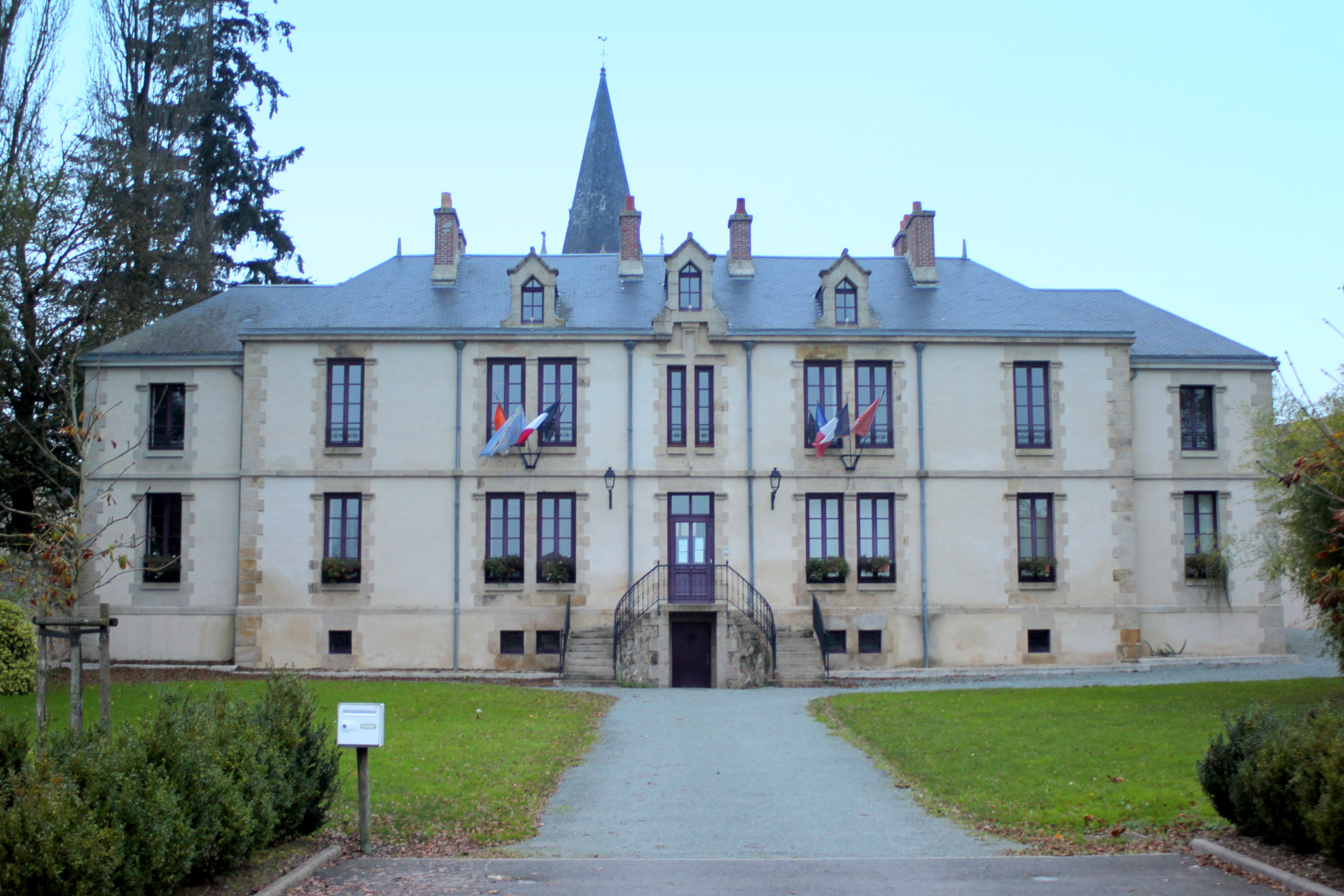
- Sèvremont Town hall
- Location of Sèvremont
- Location within France Location within Pays de la Loire
- Coordinates: 46°49′55″N 0°51′47″W
- Country: France
- Region: Pays de la Loire
- Department: Vendée
- Arrondissement: Fontenay-le-Comte
- Canton: Les Herbiers

Government
  - Mayor (2020–2026): Jean-Louis Roy
- Area^{1}: 88.64 km^{2} (34.22 sq mi)
- Population (2023): 6,385
  - Density: 72.03/km^{2} (186.6/sq mi)
- Time zone: UTC+01:00 (CET)
  - Summer (DST): UTC+02:00 (CEST)
- INSEE/Postal code: 85090 /85700
- ^{1} French Land Register data, which excludes lakes, ponds, glaciers > 1 km^{2} (0.386 sq mi or 247 acres) and river estuaries.

Sèvremont (French pronunciation: [sɛvʁəmɔ̃]) is a commune in the department of Vendée, western France. The municipality was established on 1 January 2016 by merger of the former communes of La Flocellière, Les Châtelliers-Châteaumur, La Pommeraie-sur-Sèvre and Saint-Michel-Mont-Mercure.

== Population ==
Population data refer to the area corresponding with the commune as of January 2025.

Historical population
Year	Pop.	±% p.a.
1968	4,836	—
1975	4,860	+0.07%
1982	5,154	+0.84%
1990	5,406	+0.60%
1999	5,186	−0.46%
2007	5,957	+1.75%
2012	6,347	+1.28%
2017	6,486	+0.43%
2023	6,385	−0.26%
Source: INSEE

== See also ==
- Communes of the Vendée department
