= Saint-Mars-la-Réorthe =

- Commune
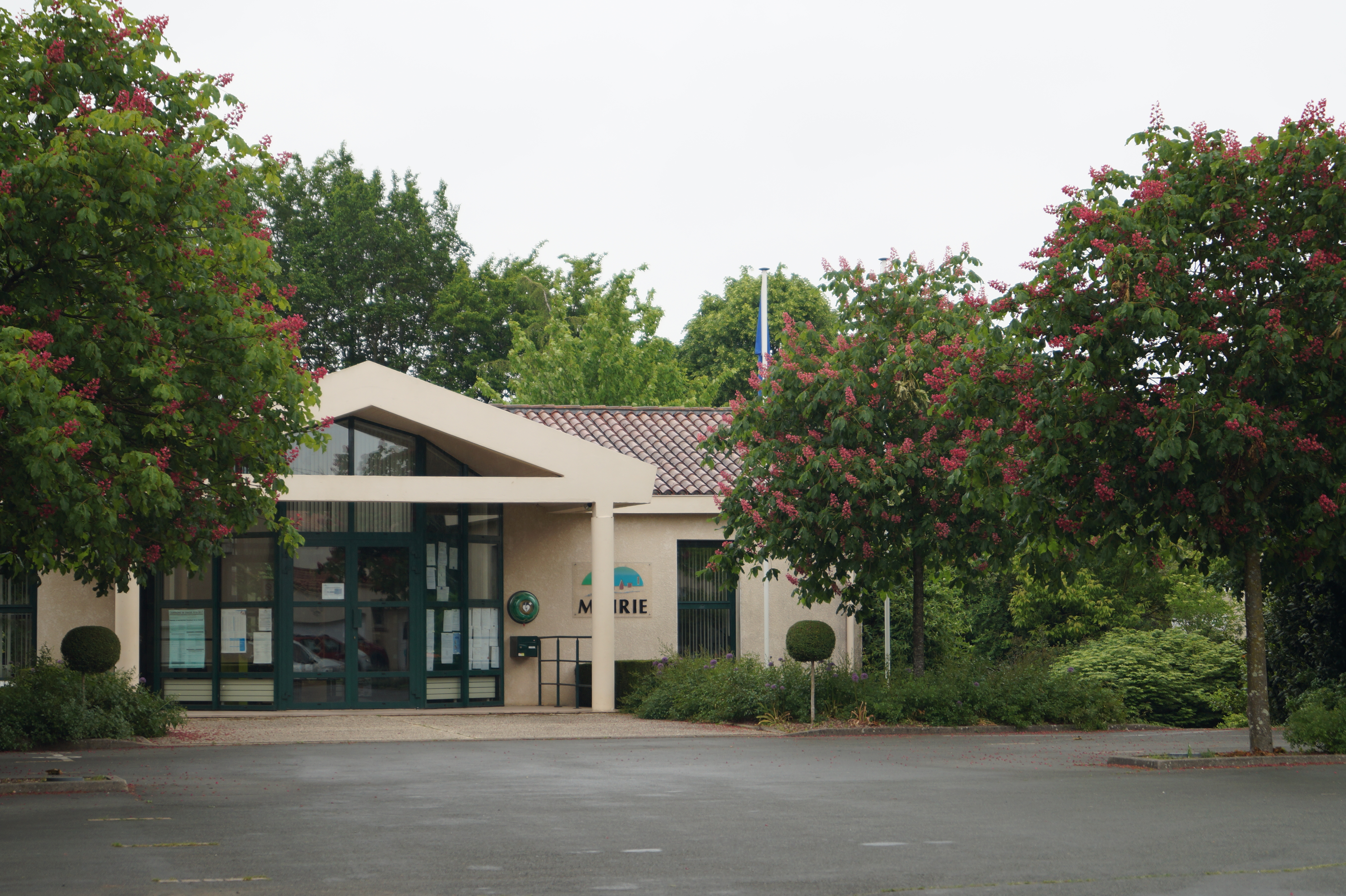
- Town hall of Saint-Mars-la-Réorthe
- Location of Saint-Mars-la-Réorthe
- Location within France Location within Pays de la Loire
- Coordinates: 46°51′45″N 0°55′28″W
- Country: France
- Region: Pays de la Loire
- Department: Vendée
- Arrondissement: La Roche-sur-Yon
- Canton: Les Herbiers
- Intercommunality: Pays des Herbiers

Government
  - Mayor (2020–2026): Patrice Bertrand
- Area^{1}: 9.28 km^{2} (3.58 sq mi)
- Highest elevation: 262 m (860 ft)
- Lowest elevation: 101 m (331 ft)
- Population (2023): 1,042
  - Density: 112/km^{2} (291/sq mi)
- Time zone: UTC+01:00 (CET)
  - Summer (DST): UTC+02:00 (CEST)
- INSEE/Postal code: 85242 /85590
- ^{1} French Land Register data, which excludes lakes, ponds, glaciers > 1 km^{2} (0.386 sq mi or 247 acres) and river estuaries.

Saint-Mars-la-Réorthe (French pronunciation: [sɛ̃ maʁ la ʁeɔʁt]) is a commune in the Vendée department in the Pays de la Loire region in western France.

== See also ==
- Communes of the Vendée department
