= Saint-Paul-en-Pareds =

- Commune
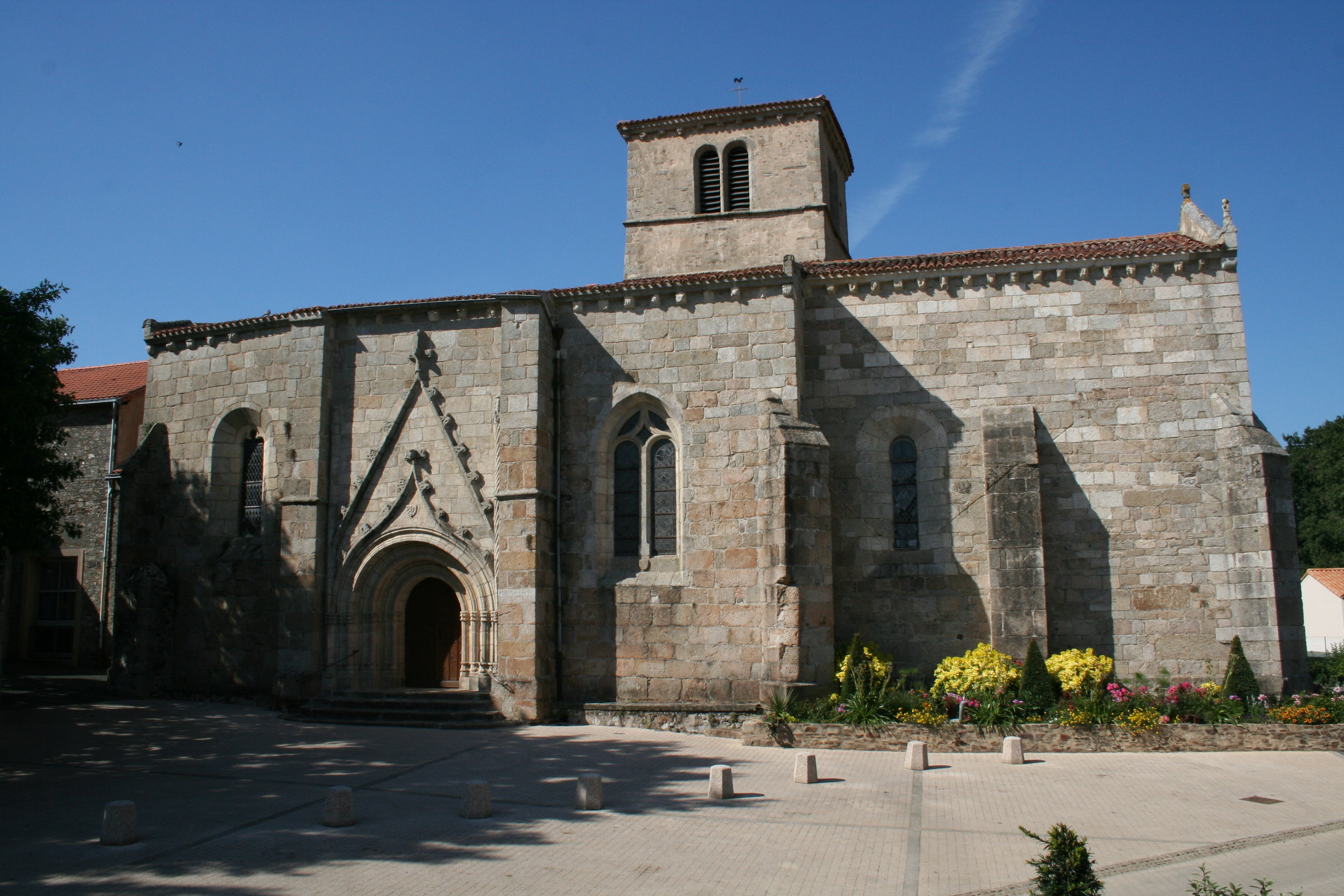
- The church in Saint Paul-en-Pareds

- Coat of arms
- Location of Saint-Paul-en-Pareds
- Location within France Location within Pays de la Loire
- Coordinates: 46°49′26″N 0°59′01″W
- Country: France
- Region: Pays de la Loire
- Department: Vendée
- Arrondissement: La Roche-sur-Yon
- Canton: Les Herbiers
- Intercommunality: Pays des Herbiers

Government
  - Mayor (2020–2026): Bénédicte Gardin
- Area^{1}: 12.32 km^{2} (4.76 sq mi)
- Highest elevation: 181 m (594 ft)
- Lowest elevation: 83 m (272 ft)
- Population (2023): 1,377
  - Density: 111.8/km^{2} (289.5/sq mi)
- Time zone: UTC+01:00 (CET)
  - Summer (DST): UTC+02:00 (CEST)
- INSEE/Postal code: 85259 /85500
- ^{1} French Land Register data, which excludes lakes, ponds, glaciers > 1 km^{2} (0.386 sq mi or 247 acres) and river estuaries.

Saint-Paul-en-Pareds (French pronunciation: [sɛ̃ pɔl ɑ̃ paʁɛ]) is a commune in the Vendée department in the Pays de la Loire region in western France.

== See also ==
- Communes of the Vendée department
