= Montournais =

- Commune
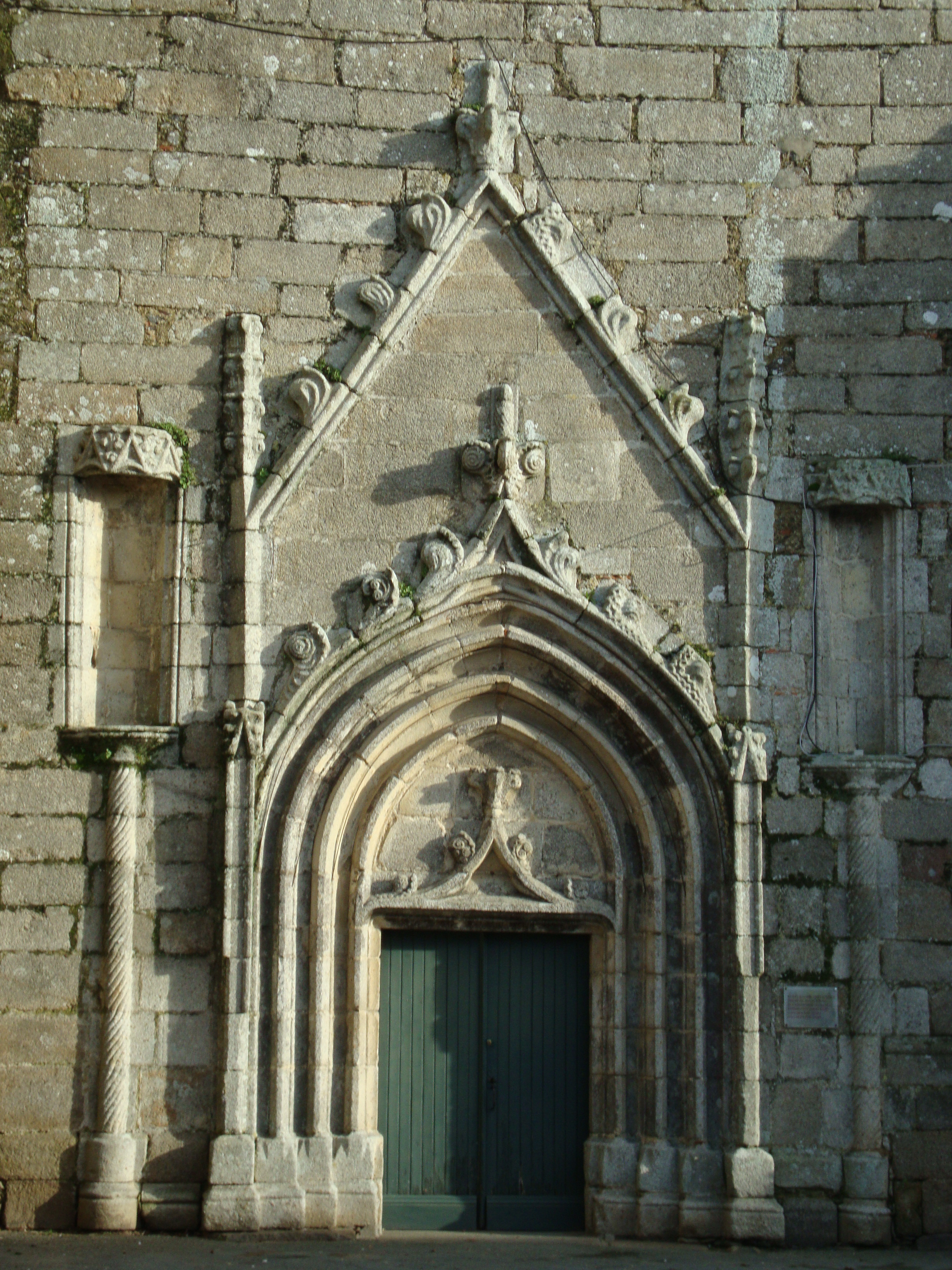
- The west door of the Church of Our Lady, in Montournais

- Coat of arms
- Location of Montournais
- Location within France Location within Pays de la Loire
- Coordinates: 46°44′33″N 0°45′43″W
- Country: France
- Region: Pays de la Loire
- Department: Vendée
- Arrondissement: Fontenay-le-Comte
- Canton: Les Herbiers
- Intercommunality: Pays de Pouzauges

Government
  - Mayor (2020–2026): Dominique Martin
- Area^{1}: 29.14 km^{2} (11.25 sq mi)
- Highest elevation: 251 m (823 ft)
- Lowest elevation: 103 m (338 ft)
- Population (2023): 1,630
  - Density: 55.9/km^{2} (145/sq mi)
- Time zone: UTC+01:00 (CET)
  - Summer (DST): UTC+02:00 (CEST)
- INSEE/Postal code: 85147 /85700
- ^{1} French Land Register data, which excludes lakes, ponds, glaciers > 1 km^{2} (0.386 sq mi or 247 acres) and river estuaries.

Montournais (French pronunciation: [mɔ̃tuʁnɛ]) is a commune in the Vendée department in the Pays de la Loire region in western France.

== Geography ==
The river Lay forms all of the commune's southern border.

== See also ==
- Communes of the Vendée department
