= Monsireigne =

- Commune
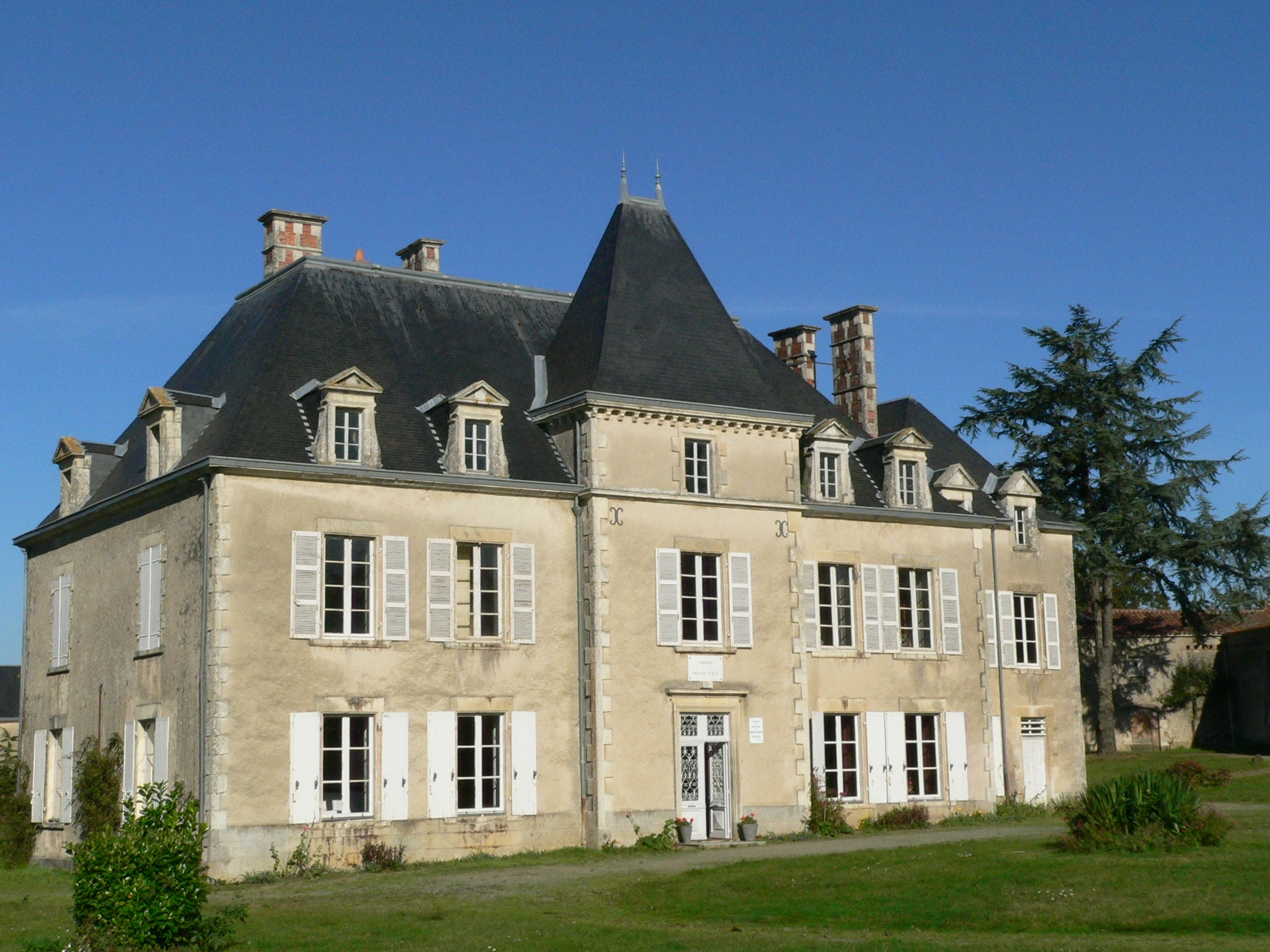
- The French Protestant Museum of the West of France

- Coat of arms
- Location of Monsireigne
- Location within France Location within Pays de la Loire
- Coordinates: 46°44′45″N 0°56′48″W
- Country: France
- Region: Pays de la Loire
- Department: Vendée
- Arrondissement: Fontenay-le-Comte
- Canton: Les Herbiers
- Intercommunality: Pays de Pouzauges

Government
  - Mayor (2020–2026): Michel Gaborit
- Area^{1}: 20.50 km^{2} (7.92 sq mi)
- Highest elevation: 137 m (449 ft)
- Lowest elevation: 45 m (148 ft)
- Population (2023): 999
  - Density: 48.7/km^{2} (126/sq mi)
- Time zone: UTC+01:00 (CET)
  - Summer (DST): UTC+02:00 (CEST)
- INSEE/Postal code: 85145 /85110
- ^{1} French Land Register data, which excludes lakes, ponds, glaciers > 1 km^{2} (0.386 sq mi or 247 acres) and river estuaries.

Monsireigne (French pronunciation: [mɔ̃siʁɛɲ]) is a commune in the Vendée department in the Pays de la Loire region in western France.

== Geography ==
The river Lay forms all of the commune's northern and western borders.

== See also ==
- Communes of the Vendée department
