= Jacques Auxiette =

French politician (1940–2021)

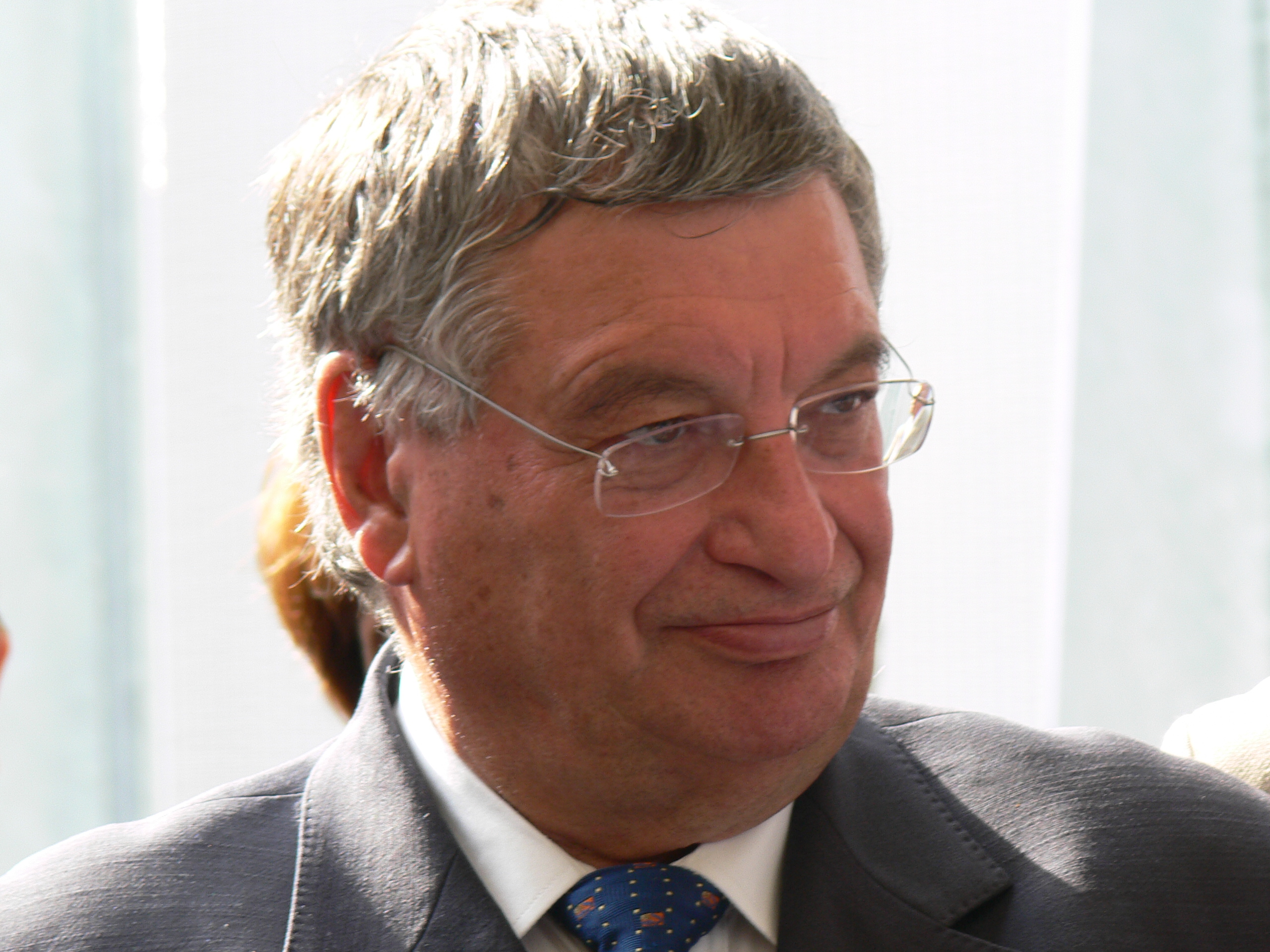
- Auxiette in 2007

President of the Regional Council of Pays de la Loire
- In office 2 April 2004 – 18 December 2015
- Preceded by: Jean-Luc Harousseau
- Succeeded by: Bruno Retailleau

Mayor of La Roche-sur-Yon
- In office 14 March 1977 – 1 April 2004
- Preceded by: Paul Caillaud
- Succeeded by: Pierre Regnault

Personal details
- Born: 3 December 1940 Montlevicq, Indre, France
- Died: 10 December 2021 (aged 81) Angers, France
- Party: Socialist Party
- Education: University of Clermont-Ferrand
- Profession: Teacher

Jacques Auxiette (French pronunciation: [ʒak oksjɛt]; 3 December 1940 – 10 December 2021) was a French politician who served as President of the Regional Council of Pays de la Loire from 2004 to 2015. He was a member of the Socialist Party (PS).

Auxiette was elected to the office following the 2004 election and was re-elected following the 2010 election. The PS–PCF–PRG–LV list he led in 2004 defeated the list led by François Fillon with 52.3% of the second-round vote. In 2010 his PS–PRG–MRC list increased its majority at 56.3% of the second-round vote against the list led by Christophe Béchu. He did not run for a third term in 2015.

Auxiette previously served as Mayor of La Roche-sur-Yon, Vendée from 1977 to 2004. He was one of the strongest opponents of the reunification of Loire-Atlantique to its historical region, Brittany.

== Honours ==
- Officer of the Legion of Honour (2016)
