= François-Joseph Grille =

- Born: December 29, 1782; Angers, France
- Died: December 5, 1853 (aged 70); L'Étang-la-Ville, France
- Occupations: Librarian of Angers, Journalist, Commissioner of the Republic of Vendée
- Writing career
- Pen name: Malvoisine, Hélyon Champ-Charles
- Language: French

François-Joseph Grille (29 December 1792 – 5 December 1853) was a 19th-century French man of letters, journalist and politician.

== Biography ==
François-Joseph Grille was born in Angers. He was the son of F. Grille and Madeleine-Marthe Fillon du Pin, and the nephew of Toussaint Grille (1766–1850) who was director of the municipal library of Angers in 1805.

From 1807 to 1830, he held several posts in the Interior Ministry. In 1814 he was appointed head of the 3rd Division, Science and Fine Arts of the Ministry. In 1838 he was librarian of the city of Angers.

During the French Revolution of 1848, he was appointed Commissioner of the Provisional Government, and prefect of Vendée 30 March 1848 and dismissed in October.

== Work ==
Francois-Joseph Grille wrote under his own name, anonymously, and using numerous pseudonyms, among others Malvoisine and Hélyon Champ-Charles. He wrote a number of letter essays.

In 1840, he published L'émigration Angevine, a collection of rare materials on families and gentlemen from Anjou, during the French Emigration, written by a médecin d'émigrés. The manuscript was acquired by his uncle Toussaint Grille, the librarian of Angers, and entrusted in 1833 to prefect Gauja.

== Bibliography ==
- Épître à M. Quérard, Paris : Ledoyen, 1853
- Description du département du Nord, 1825–1830
- Introduction aux mémoires sur la Révolution française, ou, Tableau comparatif des mandats et pouvoirs donnés par les provinces à leurs députés aux états-généraux de 1789, Volume 2
- 1853: Le bric-à-brac : avec son catalogue raisonné,
- L'émigration Angevine, Cosnier et Lachèse, Bibliothèque des archives du Maine et Loire, Cote BIB 527, 1840
- La Fleur des pois : Carnot et Robespierre, amis et ennemis, capilotade historique, poétique, drolatique, dédiée aux bouquinistes
- Miettes littéraires, biographiques et morales, livrées au public, avec des explications. 1853
- La Vendée en 1793, Paris, Chamerot, 1851–1852
