= Army of Naples (France) =

French Army unit

The Army of Naples (French: Armée de Naples) was a French Army unit which took this name following its capture of Naples in 1799. It was related to the Army of Italy. The Army of Naples was virtually annihilated after the Battle of the Trebbia: more than half of the personnel were casualties, namely, up to 21,000 men were lost by the end of its retreat.

== Context ==
Italy in 1796

Barthélemy Catherine Joubert had just pacified northern Italy, proclaiming the Piedmontese Republic on 10 September 1798. On 6 December 1798, Joubert occupied Turin, forcing King Charles-Emmanuel to abdicate, giving up all his continental possessions and retreating to Sardinia. Meanwhile, Grand Duke Ferdinand III's Tuscany was also occupied.

King Ferdinand I of the Two Sicilies, returning from Naples, ordered a massive attack on the French, but retired to Palermo at the same time. He named Pigantelli vicar general, but the city fought against him.

The army in Rome received reinforcements from Joubert, raising its strength to 29 battalions and 21 squadrons - a force of 24,000 infantry, 2,000 cavalry, and 2,000 artillery for a total of 28,000 men, including the garrisons of Ancona and Castel Sant'Angelo. On December 20, this army left Rome, which had been ordered to disarm, and advanced on Naples in five columns. Gabriel Venance Rey, who was already in pursuit of the enemy, took the right with twelve squadrons and twelve battalions. He had orders to advance to Terracina by way of the Pontins marsh. Jacques MacDonald with three squadrons and twelve battalions had orders to cross Frosinone and Ceprano. Jean Étienne Championnet and the headquarters followed this column. Louis Lemoine's division, six battalions and three squadrons strong, had orders to push on to Sulmona. Finally, the eleven battalions and three squadrons of the far left under Guillaume Philibert Duhesme had orders to push back the enemy at Pescara then follow the river of the same name up to Popoli and there rejoin Lemoine. There was too great a distance between the right and left columns. To remedy this, Championnet directed a column of 800 men under the orders of battalion leader Maréchal to take the route that goes from Tivoli and Vicovaro around Celano Lake to Sulmona. A camp was established at Foligno to meet this group in case of failure. The poor state of the roads was just about the only difficulty Maréchal faced en route. There was a small battle between his troops and those of the enemy on the 27th and 28th of December at the crossing of the Garigliano, but the Neapolitans fled in disorder after the first clash, abandoning all their artillery. On the 30th, MacDonald set up camp between Venafro and the road from San Germano to Capua in Caianello.

This weak resistance inspired Championnet to try a more decisive strategy. At the same time, Karl Mack, who wanted a peace treaty, let his weaknesses show. However, the French general did not receive news of his left columns due to snow that blocked communications. After arriving at Ceprano, he recalled Rey's cavalry to him. After Rey arrived, Championnet decided to push to Calvi down the Volturno behind which the last remnants of Mack's columns had fled.

=== Attack on Capua ===
The Neapolitan line extended from Castellammare di Stabia at the mouth of the Volturno to the Scafa di Cajazzo (now Caserta). Each wing was made up of eight battalions and ten squadrons, while the center occupied Capua and the bridgehead built in haste on the right side of the river. This highly defensible position was filled with artillery. Championnet, who had given an unanswered ultimatum to Mack on December 3, ordered reconnaissance of the enemy position and especially Capua. The French attack included three columns, one on the left, another on the main road, and the third to the right of the fortifications. Even though the first attack faced a strong redoubt called the San-Antonio, the Neapolitans gave way. Mack was forced to threaten to have deserters shot in order to keep his men at their posts.

At first MacDonald was able to make the most of this disorder, and he was about to order the last fortifications destroyed when Mack, afraid to lose Capua, came up with a ruse: he asked MacDonald for a cease-fire for the safe passage of the Cisalpine Republic ambassador, returning to Milan from Naples. The French general reluctantly agreed to this demand and the enemy general used the time to rally his troops and reorganize them to his advantage. After the ambassador left, the battle began anew. The San-Antonio redoubt and all of its fortifications fell, but the artillery assault from the walls, which the French were ill-equipped to answer, was so deadly and constant that MacDonald was forced to pull back. Meanwhile, General Maurice Mathieu's arm was shattered by grapeshot. MacDonald took the captured Neapolitan artillery with him while returning to the morning's positions. He had lost about 300 men that day.

=== Capture of Gaeta ===
General Rey, whose small infantry column was reinforced at Fondi by that of François Étienne de Kellermann, took the gorges of Itri and pushed the Neapolitan forces that had been defending it back to Gaeta. Inspired by this success, Rey decided to try to take the city, which was defended by 4,000 soldiers armed with seventy cannons, twelve mortars and amply supplied with ammunition and food and who had access to the seven small ships docked in the harbor. After an unsuccessful ultimatum, the French fired off several shells that started several fires, terrorizing the inhabitants and even the garrison, which the octogenarian governor general Tschudi ordered to stand down. The general and 63 officers had the shameful privilege of being sent home to await a prisoner exchange. The garrison remained prisoner. Besides the artillery and the ships, French forces took 20,000 guns and bridge-building equipment that would soon allow Rey to cross the Garigliano.

=== Joining up with Lemoine's column ===
Rey's column reached Capua but Championnet decided not to risk a siege without further reinforcements necessary to a decisive attack. He worried about Lemoine and Duhesme who he had not had news of for the last ten days. Nor had he heard from Maréchal and his 800 men. He sent a party of 200 horsemen to Sulmona to try to regain contact. At the same time, General Jean Baptiste Eblé was putting together the materials for a siege at Gaeta.

On January 5, headquarters got news that Lemoine, on his way to Venafro, was being harassed by rebelling peasants - he had only fought one battle against Neapolitan soldiers. Those soldiers, after a deadly operation followed by an occupation of Popoli, had turned towards Sulmona and then on Benevento. Lemoine, master of Popoli, had waited there several days in hope of news of Duhesme, but because the number of angry peasants grew daily, he moved on to Sulmona and there rejoined Maréchal's column and the 200 men sent to meet him on the 4th. The Capua blockade tightened upon Lemoine's arrival.

=== Joining up with Duhesme's column ===
Meanwhile, after taking Civitella del Tronto, Duhesme marched on the Vomano and on Scuzzano, where he fought two battles against Micheroux's troops. He divided his forces in three columns, two of which he sent to disperse the seven to eight thousand insurgents who had just taken Teramo and burned the bridge at Tronto. The third column headed to Pescara. On the 23rd, it arrived in front of the city, strategically important due to its location at the mouth of the river of the same name and because it controlled access to the only road through Abruzzo that artillery could use. Pescara had strong fortifications with formidable artillery and abundant provisions for its 2,000 soldiers. It seemed that the French forces would need a well-organized siege that they could not mount without more artillery and bridge-building supplies to cross the river. Adjutant General Jean-Charles Monnier, who stayed near Pescara, was nonetheless fortunate enough to get into the city while Duhesme and Brigade Chief Chariot dealt with the insurgents. The governor, intimidated by Micheroux's retreat and the first ultimatum he received, surrendered immediately. Duhesme was thus saved the trouble of a long siege thanks to a stroke of good luck that supplied his troops with everything they needed. After leaving a weak garrison in Pescara, Duhesme rejoined the rest of the army by way of Sulmona and Isernia on the Volturno.

=== Surrender of Capua ===
The insurrection against the French expanded each day thanks to the intrigues of the nobles and the support of the priests. Starting in Abruzzo, it expanded to the Terra di Lavoro. Sessa Aurunca was the main meeting place for the insurgents, who had received orders to and did wage a war of extermination against the French. The French army that formed a blockade around Capua was itself surrounded by countless insurgents. Nonetheless, Championnet, whose forces were almost out of munitions and food, refused Mack's offer to give him Capua under the condition of an armistice, in spite of being in such a critical situation. Championnet instead reinforced Lemoine's division with General Forestier's legendary cavalry, which crossed the Volturno at the Lago ford, and the Venafro cavalry came as reinforcements. The whole French front was on its guard, caught between a rock and a hard place. Mack didn't dare try anything, in spite of this highly advantageous position. He wanted to evacuate Capua in order to arm the Lazzaroni and form a retrenched camp under the walls of Naples. The viceroy Domenico Pignatelli, to whom he appealed, was powerless, hated by the people, and mistrusted by the soldiers. Soon he would see no possible escape except by negotiating with the French; he sent two representatives to Championnet who were authorized to agree to anything except for the evacuation of Naples.

=== Armistice ===
Championnet met with Pignatelli's envoys in Terano at a time when the situation was turning against him and he regretted not making a deal with Mack. In fact, General Santa-Agatha and the Gambs division reinforced by three battalions seemed likely to force the weak Lemoine division into the Volturno, whose left bank they were defending, and then to take the French army from behind. The divisions of Naselli and Roger de Damas, kept at sea by unfavorable winds, meant to land at the mouth of the Garigliano. Championnet did not know what had happened to Duhesme. He decided, therefore, to accept the Neapolitan proposals. On the 11th of January General Bonnamy, representing Championnet, as well as the princes of Miliano and the Duke of Gesso, agents of the viceroy, agreed to a treaty by which the French were bound to stop at Capua and to pay two and a half million within fifteen days, and the enemies of France must leave the ports of the kingdom, etc.

=== Insurrection of the Lazzaroni ===
The people of Naples, infuriated by the armistice and feeling betrayed by the viceroy, General Mack and the Citta, armed themselves. They took weapons from the Damas division when it came ashore and also from the Dillon brigade, which Mack had sent to Pignatelli to stop the insurrection. The viceroy fled to Sicily and Mack, who had at first believed it possible to reorganize the Neapolitan army, also had to flee. Naples was entirely under the power of the insurgents and existed in a state of anarchy for three days. Prince Moliterno and the duke of Rocca Romana, who were named chiefs of the insurrection thanks to their popularity, were at last able to calm the disorder. The remains of the Neapolitan army, menaced by the revolting Lazzaroni, sought refuge in the French camps. All that remained of this army, raised at such high expense, was dispersed in two days.

=== New Division of the French Army ===
The Duhesme column rejoined the rest of the army, which was divided into three divisions. Dufresne on the right guarded the Regi-Lagni line. The reserve, under Rey, set up camp in Caserta, the new headquarters where Mack had taken up refuge near Championnet. Acerra and Arienzo to the left were occupied by the third division under Duhesme. General Lemoine was charged with bringing the peace treaty to the French Directory and General MacDonald had resigned after a misunderstanding with Championnet.

== Capture of Naples ==
After Mack's flight, the Lazzaroni attacked the French front lines at Aversa and in a few other places. This attack seemed to Championnet to constitute a violation of the armistice, the authority of the viceroy with whom he had made the treaty being so disrespected. He decided to attack Naples himself. This decision attracted to him a group offering to keep the armistice and pay a large sum if he gave up on occupying the city, but he doubted that these actions would be carried out so he refused the offer. The agents of the court in absence profited from this circumstance to increase the anger of the insurgents. The insurgents named two new chiefs, Lazzaroni Pazzto and Michel le Fou. Meanwhile, Championnet, urged by the peaceful factions in Naples to occupy the city in order to stop the disorder and protect them from the Lazzaroni, agreed on the condition that those that called him to the city should take Fort Saint Elme. His army began its march on January 20.

The Duhesme division had the difficult task of taking the Capuana gate and the bridge of the Madeleine. Colonel Broussier only took this last after a hard-fought six-hour battle. General Monnier was pushed back in his first attack on the gate. Captain Ordonneau failed in a second attempt, but Chief of Staff Thiébault attacked for a third time and succeeded thanks to Duhesme's trick of faking a retreat that drew the Neapolitans into an ambush. The ambushed grenadiers and chasseurs, fighting back with bayonets when their enemies did an about-face that pushed back the frightened Lazzaroni and fought wildly across the bridge. The French took all of the enemy's artillery. "This is what I call getting a good rank by way of a good gate." said Duhesme to Thiébault when Championnet named him Adjutant General on the battlefield. Championnet then tried a peaceful approach which was poorly received by the insurgents. At the same time that Moliterno and Rocca Romana, aided by 600 young people, were taking Saint-Elme Fort, Championnet sent two battalions to take possession of it. The last preparations for the attack on Naples took place that night. At dawn, Fort Saint-Elme, shooting its cannons at the Lazzaroni, gave the signal to march to five columns that meant to enter the city from different directions. Rusca and Broussier, placed to the left with two thirds of Duhesme's division in two columns, entered by way of the outlying part of Capua and the bridge of the Madeleine and reunited, pushing back the masses in front of them by way of the Fort of El-Carmine, whose walls they had order to scale but which gave up without resistance. The Nola gate group surrendered its arms with little resistance.

Kellermann, starting in Serraglio, was ordered to head to the Castel Nuovo, but he met with intense resistance from Poggio supported by hundreds of Albanians, who he beat back foot by foot to the Largo del Castello. Brigade Chief Calvin, though protected by a port entrance, fared little better. He had to use the roads at the foot of Saint-Elme's Fort in order to take a stand at the Castel dell'Ovo and he was held at bay by two Neapolitan columns. At this point Michel le Fou, taken prisoner by Rusca, was taken before Championnet. Championnet treated the leaders of the Lazzaroni well and promised to respect San Gennaro, patron saint of Naples. Michel served as an intermediary to the people. An honor guard given to San Gennaro, something some Lazzaroni saw with their own eyes, produced an incredible effect and the angry cries changed to "Long live the French!" Championnet took advantage of this sudden change of heart to take all of the forts. Reserves camped on the plazas and the rest of the army camped on the highlands that dominate the city.

== Creation of the Army of Naples ==
The French lost 600 men in the fight for Naples. Neapolitan losses were also substantial. Taking Naples, the French captured 60 cannons, 6 flags, and 4,000 Albanian and Swiss troops who had remained in Naples after the dispersion of the Neapolitan army. The French army received the title Army of Naples from its general in a ceremony on January 25. A Te Deum was sung in all the churches and the general in chief gave a proclamation calling all Neapolitans to freedom and reassuring them of the benevolence of the French government

== 1805 Order of Battle ==
The order of battle for the army in December 1805 was:

- Commanding General, Lieutenant Général Laurent de Saint-Cyr
- Chief of Staff, Général de Brigade Jean Baptiste Franceschi-Delonne
- Chief of Artillery, Général de Brigade Salva (513 men)
  - 1er Régiment d'Artillerie à Cheval
  - 19éme Compagnie du 2éme Régiment d'Artillerie à Pied
  - 3éme & 4éme Compagnies du 5éme Régiment d'Artillerie à Pied
  - Unknown companies from 3éme Régiment d'Artillerie à Pied
- Chief of Engineers, Chef de Bataillon Michel
- 1st Division, commanded by Général de Division Joseph Hélie de Montrichard
  - 9éme Régiment de Chasseurs à Cheval (4 Squadrons)
  - 42éme Régiment d'Infanterie de Ligne (3 Battalions)
  - 1er Régiment Légère (3 Battalions)
  - 4éme Régiment Légère (3 Battalions)
  - Artillery (1 company)
- 2nd Division, commanded by Général de Division Jean Reynier
  - 6éme Régiment de Chasseurs à Cheval (4 Squadrons)
  - 3° Reggimento di Fanteria (2 Battalions, from Kingdom of Italy)
  - 4éme Bataillon du 1er Régiment de Suisses Infanterie (from Swiss Confederation)
  - 1er Bataillon du 32éme Régiment Légère
  - Artillery (1 company)
- 3rd Division, commanded by Général de Division Giuseppe Lechi
  - 1° Reggimento di Cacciatori a Cavallo (4 Squadrons, from Kingdom of Italy)
  - 2° Reggimento di Fanteria (2 Battalions, from Kingdom of Italy)
  - 4° Reggimento di Fanteria (2 Battalions, from Kingdom of Italy)
  - 5° Reggimento di Fanteria (2 Battalions, from Kingdom of Italy)
  - Artillery (2 companies)
- 4th Division
  - Régiment des Hussards Polonaise (4 Squadrons)
  - 1er Légion Polonaise (3 Battalions)
  - Artillery & Engineers (1 Company)
- Reserve Division, commanded by Général de Brigade Luigi Gaspare Peyri
  - 7éme Régiment de Dragons (4 Squadrons)
  - 28éme Régiment de Dragons (4 Squadrons)
  - Artillery (1 company)

== Composition ==
The regiments and detachments which served as part of the Armée de Naples included:

Cavalry

- 4th Regiment of Mounted Hunters 4éme Régiment de Chasseurs à Cheval (1809–1812, transferred to III Cavalry Corps in the Grande Armée in preparation for the Invasion of Russia)
- 6th Regiment of Mounted Hunters 6éme Régiment de Chasseurs à Cheval (1804–1808, transferred north to Army of Italy)
- 9th Regiment of Mounted Hunters 9éme Régiment de Chasseurs à Cheval (1807–1809, transferred north to Army of Italy)
- 14th Regiment of Mounted Hunters 14éme Régiment de Chasseurs à Cheval (1806–1807, transferred to VI Corps in the Grande Armée)
- 19th Regiment of Mounted Hunters 19éme Régiment de Chasseurs à Cheval (1806–1807, moved to join the Siege of Danzig)
- 24th Regiment of Mounted Hunters 24éme Régiment de Chasseurs à Cheval (1806–1807, transferred to VI Corps in the Grande Armée)
- 25th Regiment of Mounted Hunters 25éme Régiment de Chasseurs à Cheval (1806–1809, transferred north to the Army of Italy)
- 7th Regiment of Dragoons 7éme Régiment de Dragons (Invasion–1809, transferred north to Army of Italy)
- 23rd Regiment of Dragoons 23éme Régiment de Dragons (Invasion–late 1809, moved to Austria)
- 24th Regiment of Dragoons 24éme Régiment de Dragons (1801–1808, moved to Spain)
- 28th Regiment of Dragoons 28éme Régiment de Dragons (1802–1807, moved to Spain)
- 29th Regiment of Dragoons 29éme Régiment de Dragons (1807–1809, moved north to Army of Italy)
- 30th Regiment of Dragoons 30éme Régiment de Dragons (1805–1809, transferred to Grande Armée)

Infantry

- 1st Infantry Regiment of the Line 1ére Régiment d'Infanterie de Ligne (1806–1809, transferred to Grande Armée)
- 6th Infantry Regiment of the Line 6éme Régiment d'Infanterie de Ligne (1806–1813, moved to Berlin)
- 10th Infantry Regiment of the Line 10éme Régiment d'Infanterie de Ligne (1808–1811, moved to Spain)
- 20th Infantry Regiment of the Line 20éme Régiment d'Infanterie de Ligne (1806–1811, moved to Navarre (Spain))
- 29th Infantry Regiment of the Line 29éme Régiment d'Infanterie de Ligne (1806–1809, moved to Tyrol)
- 42nd Infantry Regiment of the Line 42éme Régiment d'Infanterie de Ligne (1807–1809, dispersed and moved to Spain, Army of Italy, and Austria)
- 52nd Infantry Regiment of the Line 52éme Régiment d'Infanterie de Ligne (1806–1808, moved north to the Army of Italy)
- 62nd Infantry Regiment of the Line 62éme Régiment d'Infanterie de Ligne (Invasion–1808, moved north to the Army of Italy)
- 81st Infantry Regiment of the Line 81éme Régiment d'Infanterie de Ligne (1806–1808, transferred to the Grande Armée)
- 101st Infantry Regiment of the Line 101ére Régiment d'Infanterie de Ligne (1805–1811, transferred to Spain)
- 102nd Infantry Regiment of the Line 102éme Régiment d'Infanterie de Ligne (1803–1809, moved north to the Army of Italy)
- 1st Regiment of Light Infantry 1ére Régiment d'Infanterie Légère (1806–1809, dispersed in 1807, and in 1809 combined in Spain)
- 14th Regiment of Light Infantry 14éme Régiment d'Infanterie Légère (1806–1812, joined Grande Armée for the Invasion of Russia)
- 22nd Regiment of Light Infantry 22éme Régiment d'Infanterie Légère (1806–1809, transferred north to the Army of Italy)
- 23rd Regiment of Light Infantry 23éme Régiment d'Infanterie Légère (1807–1809 on anti-guerrilla operations, transferred to Grande Armée)
- 32nd Regiment of Light Infantry 32éme Régiment d'Infanterie Légère (1805–1808, transferred to Spain)

Auxiliary Troops

- Corsican Light Infantry Infanterie Légère Corse (1809–1810, transferred to Neapolitan Army)
- Corsican Legion Légion Corse (1802–1806, 1st and 2nd battalions transferred to Neapolitan Army, 3rd became the Corsican Tirailleurs)

Artillery

- 1st Regiment of Horse Artillery 1ére Régiment d'Artillerie à Cheval (1806–1809, transferred to the Grande Armée)
- For the 1809 Campaign:
  - 2nd Company of the 2nd Regiment of Foot Artillery 2éme Compagnie du 2éme Régiment d'Artillerie à Pied, in Monteleone
  - 3rd Company of the 2nd Regiment of Foot Artillery 3éme Compagnie du 2éme Régiment d'Artillerie à Pied, in Scilla
  - 6th Company of the 2nd Regiment of Foot Artillery 6éme Compagnie du 2éme Régiment d'Artillerie à Pied, in Scilla
  - 19th Company of the 2nd Regiment of Foot Artillery 19éme Compagnie du 2éme Régiment d'Artillerie à Pied, in Capri
  - 22nd Company of the 2nd Regiment of Foot Artillery 22éme Compagnie du 2éme Régiment d'Artillerie à Pied, in Scilla
