= Lionel de Tinguy du Pouët =

French politician

- Born: 6 April 1911; Paris, France
- Died: 9 September 1981 (aged 70); Neuilly-sur-Seine, France
- Education: École Polytechnique; Sciences Po
- Occupation: Politician
- Parent: Jean de Tinguy du Pouët

Lionel de Tinguy du Pouët (6 April 1911 – 9 September 1981) was a French politician.

== Early life ==
Lionel de Tinguy du Pouët was born on 6 April 1911 in Paris. His father, Jean de Tinguy du Pouët, was a politician.

Tinguy graduated from the École Polytechnique and the Sciences Po, and he also earned a law degree.

== Career ==
Tinguy served as a member of the National Assembly representing Vendée from 1946 to 1958, and from 1962 to 1967. He was the Minister of Merchant Marine from July 2, 1950 to July 12, 1950. He also served as a member of the French Senate from 1977 to 1981.

== Death ==
Tinguy died on 9 September 1981 in Neuilly-sur-Seine near Paris.
