= Réaumur, Vendée =

Réaumur
- Commune
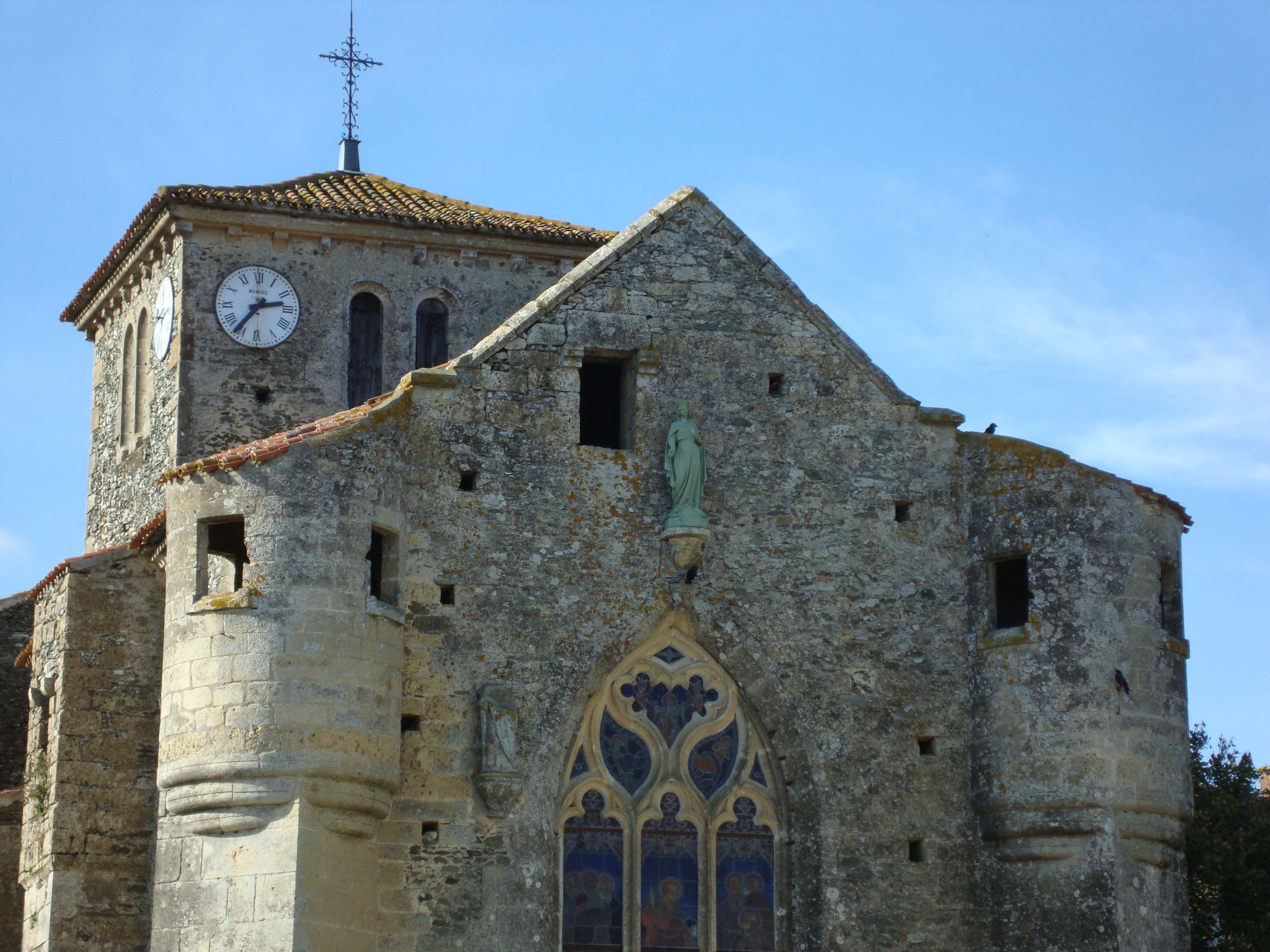
- The church of Our Lady, in Réaumur

- Coat of arms
- Location of Réaumur
- Location within France Location within Pays de la Loire
- Coordinates: 46°43′13″N 0°48′02″W
- Country: France
- Region: Pays de la Loire
- Department: Vendée
- Arrondissement: Fontenay-le-Comte
- Canton: Les Herbiers
- Intercommunality: Pays de Pouzauges

Government
  - Mayor (2020–2026): Céline Reveau
- Area^{1}: 22.09 km^{2} (8.53 sq mi)
- Highest elevation: 187 m (614 ft)
- Lowest elevation: 98 m (322 ft)
- Population (2023): 857
  - Density: 38.8/km^{2} (100/sq mi)
- Time zone: UTC+01:00 (CET)
  - Summer (DST): UTC+02:00 (CEST)
- INSEE/Postal code: 85187 /85700
- ^{1} French Land Register data, which excludes lakes, ponds, glaciers > 1 km^{2} (0.386 sq mi or 247 acres) and river estuaries.

Réaumur (French pronunciation: [ʁeomyʁ]) is a commune in the Vendée department in the Pays de la Loire region in western France.

== Geography ==
The village lies on the left bank of the Lay, which forms all of the commune's northern border.

== See also ==
- Communes of the Vendée department
