= Canton of Les Herbiers =

Coordinates: 46.87°N 1.01°W

The canton of Les Herbiers is an administrative division of the Vendée department, western France. Its borders were modified at the French canton reorganisation which came into effect in March 2015. Its seat is in Les Herbiers.

It consists of the following communes:

1. Chavagnes-les-Redoux
2. Les Epesses
3. Les Herbiers
4. La Meilleraie-Tillay
5. Monsireigne
6. Montournais
7. Mouchamps
8. Pouzauges
9. Réaumur
10. Saint-Mars-la-Réorthe
11. Saint-Mesmin
12. Saint-Paul-en-Pareds
13. Sèvremont
14. Tallud-Sainte-Gemme
