= House of Maillé =

French noble family from Touraine

Maillé
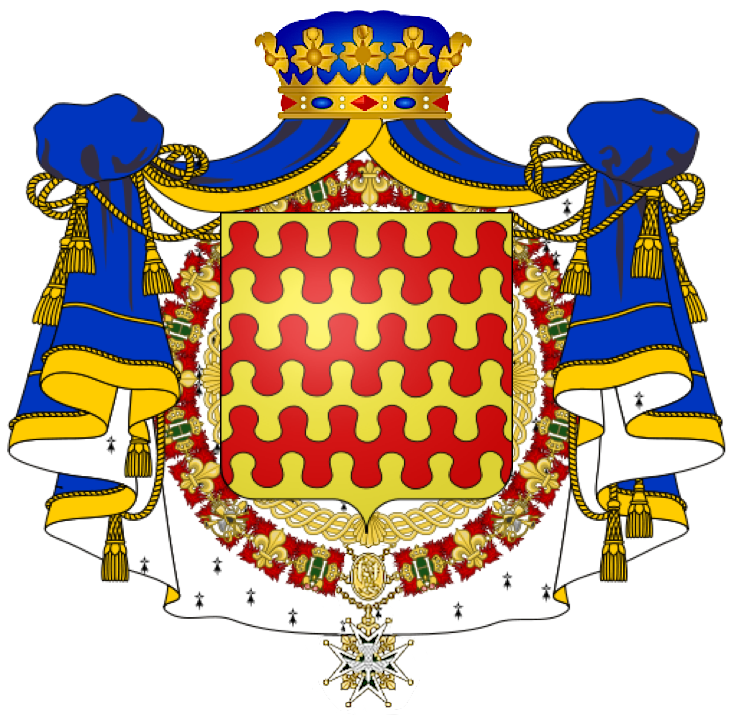
- D'or à trois fasces nébulées de gueules
- Origin: Touraine
- Founded: 11th century
- Titles: Marshal of France; Grand Master of Navigation; Archbishop of Tours; Bishop of Rennes; Senator of Maine-et-Loire; Deputy of Maine-et-Loire; Departmental councilor Mayor
- Distinctions: Member of the ANF (1936)
- Motto: Stetit unda fluens (Reste au-dessus des flots); Second motto: "Tant que le monde sera monde, à Maillé il y aura des ondes"
- Estates: Château de Châteauneuf-sur-Cher; Château de Luynes; Château de Milly-le-Meugon; Château de la Jumellière; Château d'Ampoigné; Logis du Plessis
- Branches: Maillé; Brézé; La Forest; La Tour-Landry

The House of Maillé is a surviving French noble family of knightly origin, originating from Touraine and later established in Anjou and Maine. The family has produced notable figures, including a Marshal of France, a Grand Master of Navigation, (Note: Equivalent to the title of Grand Admiral of France.) an Archbishop of Tours, a Bishop of Rennes, and the beatified Jeanne-Marie de Maillé.

== Origin ==
The Maillé family's documented lineage dates back to 1069 with Gilduin de Maillé. The family derives its name from the lordship of Maillé in Indre-et-Loire, which passed through marriage around 1501 to Gilles de Laval and was later renamed Luynes when it was elevated to a duchy-peerage in 1619 for Charles d'Albert de Luynes, who purchased it that year.

== Senior branch ==
According to the genealogy provided by Anselme de Sainte-Marie in Histoire généalogique et chronologique de la Maison Royale de France and reiterated by Henri Jougla de Morenas in 1939, the documented lineage begins with:

- Gilduin, Lord of Maillé (d. 1069), married Agnès de Vendôme, producing:
  - Hardouin de Maillé (b. before 1084, d. after 1096), who built the church of Saint-Venant. His castle was seized by Fulk le Réchin. Married Beatrix, becoming vassals of the Counts of Anjou.
  - Jaquelin de Maillé (b. before 1118, d. after 1151), Baron of Maillé, accompanied Fulk V of Anjou in campaigns against Henry I and was present at the Battle of Sées. He joined Geoffrey V of Anjou at his marriage to Matilda of England. Married Adeline.
  - Hardouin II de Maillé, followed by:
  - Hardouin III de Maillé, followed by:
  - Hardouin IV, Baron of Maillé, Seneschal of Poitou in 1233. With Amaury I de Craon, he aided Breton barons rebelling against their duke, Peter de Dreux. Married Jeanne de Thouars.
  - Hardouin V, Baron of Maillé, joined Saint Louis on the Seventh Crusade in 1248, living until at least 1275. Married first Jeanne de Beaucé, producing Hardouin VI and Payen (d. before 1347, ancestor of the Brézé branch), and second Jeanne de Parthenay.
  - Hardouin VI de Maillé (b. before 1303, d. 1336), knight, Lord of Maillé, accompanied Philip IV in the Flanders wars. Married Jeanne de Montbazon.
  - Hardouin VII de Maillé (b. before 1336, d. 1381), knight, Baron of Maillé, fought in a battle where Eudes IV of Burgundy defeated Edward III's army. Married Mahaud Le Vayer.
  - Hardouin VIII de Maillé (b. before 1381, d. 1432), Baron of Maillé and Rochecorbon, married Petronelle d'Amboise in 1412, acquiring the barony of Rochecorbon, viscounty of Tours, and Montils. Attended Charles VII's coronation at Reims.
  - Hardouin IX de Maillé (1432–c. 1463), Baron of Maillé, Seneschal of Saintonge, sold Montils-lès-Tours to Louis XI for 5,500 gold écus and the unification of his lordships. Married Antoinette de Chauvigny, Lady of Châteauroux and Viscountess of Brosse.
  - François de Maillé, Lord of Maillé, Rochecorbon, Viscount of Tours and Brosse. Married Marguerite de Rohan, Lady of Pontchâteau.
  - Françoise de Maillé (c. 1493–1518/1534), Viscountess of Brosse, Baroness of Pontchâteau, Lady of Maillé, Rochecorbon, La Haye, and La Mothe-Saint-Héray. She brought Maillé to Gilles I de Laval-Loué through marriage around 1500.
  - Hardouin X de Maillé (1462–1524), married Françoise de La Tour-Landry, founding the La Tour-Landry branch.

== Brézé and Bénéhard branch ==
Payen I de Maillé (1289–c. 1347), Seneschal of Périgord (recorded 1339, 1341), younger brother of Hardouin VI, married Jeanne de Lestang, Lady of Brézé, in 1318. Their descendants include:

- Payen II de Maillé-Brézé (1318/1319–1396/1397), married Jeanne Bouchard d'Aubeterre.
- Payen III de Maillé (1379–1420/1428), married his cousin Marie de Maillé, daughter of Hardouin VII.
- Jeanne de Maillé, married Thibault de Laval-Loué.
- Gilles de Maillé, married Anne Aménard in 1440, producing:
  - Hardouin XII de Maillé (d. 1508), married Ambroise de Melun.
  - Guy de Maillé (d. 1551), followed by:
  - Artus de Maillé, followed by:
  - Claude de Maillé (1550–1587), followed by:
  - Charles de Maillé (1570–1615), father of:
    - Urbain de Maillé-Brézé (1598–1650), Marshal of France.
    - Jean Armand de Maillé (1619–1646), Marquis of Brézé, Duke of Fronsac.
    - Claire-Clémence de Maillé (1628–1694), married Louis II de Bourbon-Condé.
- Hardouin XI de Maillé, married Anne de Villiers, Lady of Bénéhard, producing:
  - Jacques I de Maillé, married Jeanne Berruyer.
  - Jacques II de Maillé, Lord of Bénéhard, married Marie de Villebresme.
  - Jacques III de Maillé, Marquis of Bénéhard, married Renée de Pincé in 1573.
  - René I de Maillé-Bénéhard, Captain of the Maine Hunts, married Dorothée Clausse in 1621.
  - René II de Maillé-Bénéhard, married twice: Gabrielle Guillebert in 1655 and Jacqueline de Billes.
  - René-François de Maillé-Bénéhard, married Anne-Madeleine de La Luzerne in 1720.
  - Philippe-François de Maillé (1722–1745), Marquis of Maillé in 1737, died unmarried.
  - René-César-Francis de Maillé (1726–1750), Marquis of Bénéhard and Maillé, officer in the King's Infantry Regiment, died unmarried.

== La Forest branch ==
The Breton branch of the Maillé family, based at the Château de Maillé in Plounévez-Lochrist (Finistère), was granted the title of Count of Maillé in 1626.

== La Tour-Landry branch ==
Hardouin X de Maillé (1462–1524), Lord of Benais, married Françoise de La Tour-Landry on 30 July 1494, inheriting her family's name and the lordship of La Tour-Landry. Sébastien de Maillé de La Tour-Landry (b. 1972), Marquis of Maillé, is the current head of the family.

== Notable members ==
- Jeanne-Marie de Maillé (1331–1414), French nun beatified by the Catholic Church, celebrated on 28 March.

=== Brézé branch ===
- Urbain de Maillé, 2nd Marquis of Brézé (1597–1650), Marshal of France (1632). Captured Heidelberg and Speyer (1635) and, with the Duke of La Meilleraye, retook Bapaume from the Spanish (1641). Appointed Viceroy of Catalonia (1641), he failed to capture Collioure or Perpignan and resigned in 1642. Retired from military service in 1645. Married Nicole du Plessis-Richelieu, making him the brother-in-law of Cardinal Richelieu.
- Jean Armand de Maillé, Marquis of Brézé, Duke of Fronsac (1619–1646), son of Urbain. Named colonel at 15, general of the galleys at 20, and Grand Master of Navigation at 24. Participated in eight naval campaigns, securing French dominance in the western Mediterranean under Louis XIII. Died at the Battle of Orbetello at age 27. His name honored his uncle and godfather, Cardinal Richelieu. (Note: Sometimes recorded as Armand-Jean.)
- Claire-Clémence de Maillé (1628–1694), sister of Jean Armand, married Louis II de Bourbon-Condé. Born at Brézé, died in 1694.
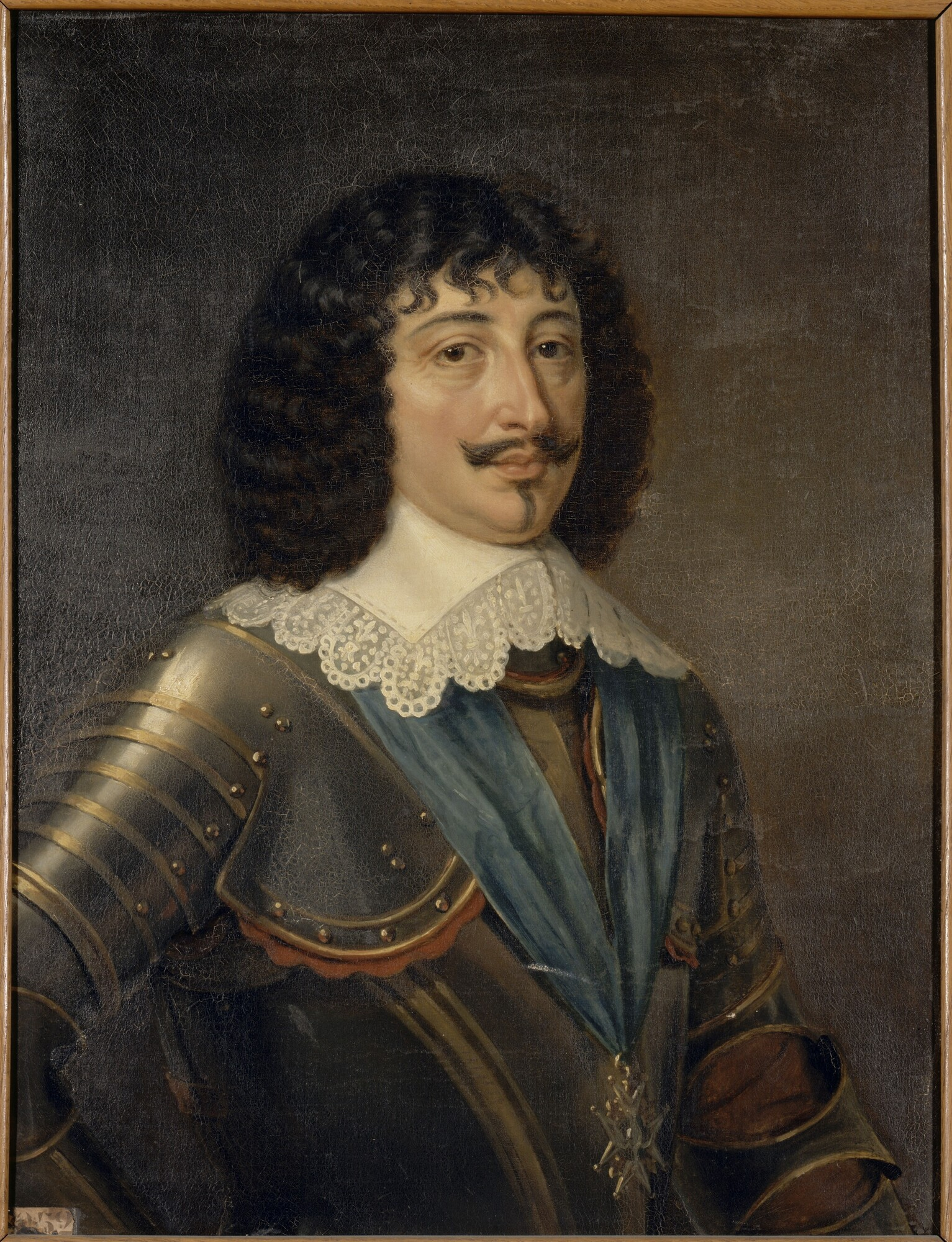
Urbain de Maillé, Marquis of Brézé, Marshal of France (1597–1650)

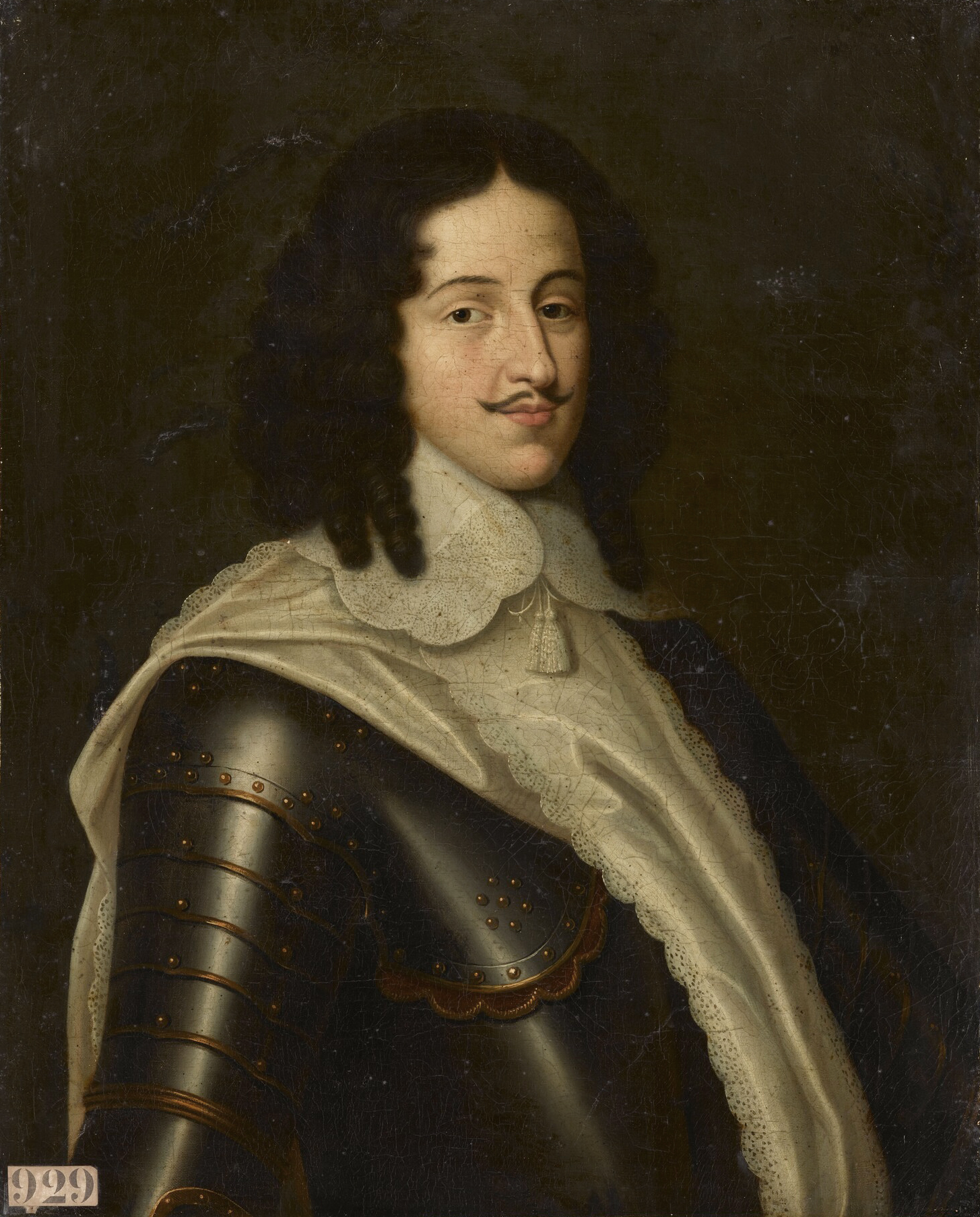
Jean Armand de Maillé, Duke of Fronsac, Marquis of Brézé

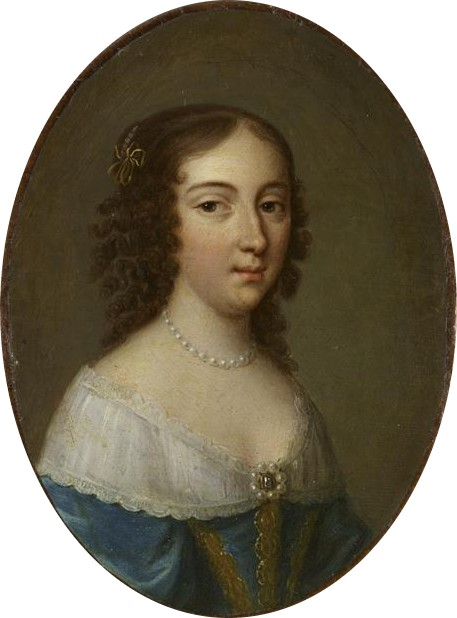
Claire-Clémence de Maillé, Princess of Condé

=== La Tour-Landry branch ===
- Jean-Baptiste-Marie de Maillé de La Tour-Landry (1743–1804), successively Bishop of Gap, Saint-Papoul, and Rennes.
- Charles de Maillé de La Tour-Landry (1770–1837), general and politician.
- Claire de Maillé de La Tour-Landry (1796–1861), married the Duke of Castries; a noted mistress of Honoré de Balzac.
- Armand-Urbain de Maillé de La Tour-Landry (1816–1903), politician.
- Louis Armand Joseph de Maillé de La Tour-Landry (1860–1907), 4th Duke of Plaisance (1872), descended from Charles-François Lebrun, 1st Duke of Plaisance.
- Gilles de Maillé de La Tour-Landry (1893–1972), cavalry officer, colonel, and administrator of the SCTT.

== Dukes of Maillé ==
The Duchy of Maillé, a peerage of France, was created in 1784 for Charles René de Maillé de La Tour-Landry, from the junior La Tour-Landry branch. The title remains extant.

1. 1784–1791: Charles René de Maillé de La Tour-Landry (1732–1791), 1st Duke of Maillé;
2. 1791–1837: Charles François Armand de Maillé de La Tour-Landry (1770–1837), 2nd Duke of Maillé;
3. 1837–1874: Jacquelin Armand Charles de Maillé de La Tour-Landry (1815–1874), 3rd Duke of Maillé;
4. 1874–1926: Artus Hippolyte Jean de Maillé de La Tour-Landry (1858–1926), 4th Duke of Maillé;
5. 1926–1972: Gilles de Maillé de La Tour-Landry (1893–1972), 5th Duke of Maillé;
6. 1972–1996: Stanislas de Maillé de La Tour-Landry (1946–1996), 6th Duke of Maillé;
7. Since 1996: Geoffroy de Maillé de La Tour-Landry (b. 1972), 7th Duke of Maillé;

== Dukes of Plaisance ==
1. 1872–1907: Louis Armand Joseph de Maillé de La Tour-Landry (1860–1907), 4th Duke of Plaisance (a Napoleonic title created in 1808), via his mother's descent from Charles-François Lebrun, 1st Duke of Plaisance.
2. 1907–1913: Armand Louis Joseph François de Maillé de La Tour-Landry (1892–1913), 5th Duke of Plaisance, son of the previous, died without issue.
3. 1913–1926: François Charles Edmond Marie de Maillé de La Tour-Landry (1862–1926), 6th Duke of Plaisance, uncle of the previous.

== Titles ==
The Maillé family held the following titles:

- Marquis of Brézé (extinct);
- Duke by brevet of Fronsac (1643, personal, for Jean Armand de Maillé, extinct);
- Count of Maillé (1626, extant, Anjou branch);
- Duke of Plaisance (1872, for Louis Armand Joseph de Maillé de La Tour-Landry, extinct);
- Duke of Maillé (duke and peer, 1784, extant, La Tour-Landry branch);

== Legacy ==
The Maillé name appears in several French locales:

- Chemillé-en-Anjou: Rue de Maillé;
- Créteil: École and Collège de Maillé;
- Montlhéry: Rue de Maillé;
- Tours: Rue de Maillé;

== Arms ==
- D'or à trois fasces nébulées de gueules;
- Motto: Stetit Unda Fluens (Reste au-dessus des flots);

Upon the marriage of Françoise de La Tour-Landry to Hardouin de Maillé on 30 July 1494, Hardouin agreed to adopt the La Tour-Landry arms (d'or à une fasce de gueules crénelée de 3 pièces et maçonnée de sable). The king later relieved him of this obligation, but his descendants have since been styled de Maillé de La Tour-Landry.

Arms	Description
	Arms of the Maillé family: D'or à trois fasces nébulées de gueules
	Arms of Urbain de Maillé, Marquis of Brézé, Marshal of France (1597–1650)
	Arms of the La Tour-Landry family: D'or à une fasce de gueules crénelée de 3 pièces et maçonnée de sable. Extinct in the Maillé family via marriage in 1494.
	Arms of Claire-Clémence de Maillé, Princess of Condé
	Arms of Jean-Baptiste-Marie de Maillé de La Tour-Landry, Bishop of Gap, Saint-Papoul, and Rennes
	Arms of the Maillé de La Tour-Landry, Dukes of Plaisance: Quartered, 1st and 4th Maillé, 2nd and 3rd Lebrun de Plaisance.

== See also ==
- Peerage of France
- Touraine
- Maine (province)
- Marshal of France
- Seventh Crusade

== Bibliography ==
- Morenas, Henri Jougla de (1939). Grand Armorial de France [Great Armorial of France] (PDF) (in French). Vol. 4.
- Sainte-Marie, Anselme de (1733). Histoire généalogique et chronologique de la Maison Royale de France, des pairs, des grands officiers de la Couronne [Genealogical and Chronological History of the Royal House of France, Peers, and Great Officers of the Crown] (in French). Vol. 7.
- Lainé, Paul Louis (1836). Archives généalogiques et historiques de la noblesse de France [Genealogical and Historical Archives of the French Nobility] (in French). Vol. 5. pp. 1–22.
- Ledru, Ambroise; Denis, L. J.; Vallée, Eugène (1905). La maison de Maillé: Histoire généalogique [The Maillé Family: Genealogical History] (in French). Vol. 1. Paris: Alphonse Lemaire.
