= Claire-Clémence de Maillé-Brézé =

Claire Clémence de Maillé
- Princess of Condé; Duchess of Fronsac
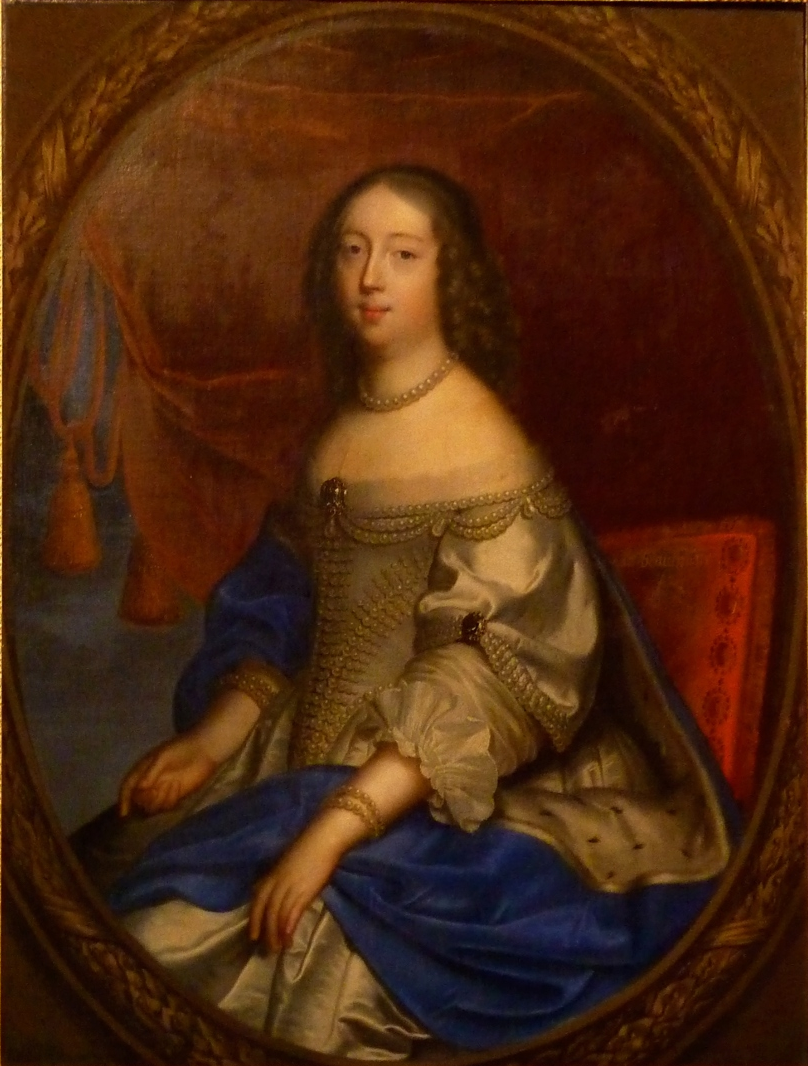
- Born: 25 February 1628; Brézé, Anjou, France
- Died: 16 April 1694 (aged 66); Château Raoul, Châteauroux, France
- Burial: Église Saint-Martin, Châteauroux, France
- Spouse: Louis de Bourbon, Prince of Condé
- Issue Detail: Henri Jules, Prince of Condé
Names
- Claire Clémence de Maillé
- Father: Urbain de Maillé, Marquis of Brézé
- Mother: Nicole du Plessis
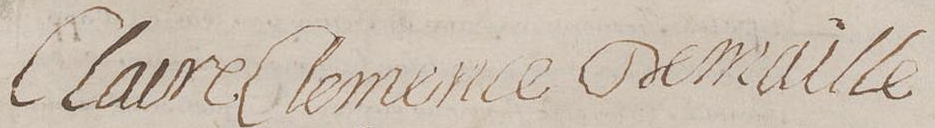
- Signature

Claire Clémence de Maillé (25 February 1628 – 16 April 1694) was a French noblewoman from the Brézé family and a niece of Cardinal Richelieu. She married Louis de Bourbon, Prince of Condé, known as Le Grand Condé (The Great Condé), and became the mother of Henri Jules. She was Princess of Condé and Duchess of Fronsac.

== Life ==
Claire Clémence was born at Brézé in the historical province of Anjou, France, as the daughter of Urbain de Maillé, marquis de Brézé, seigneur de Milly, seigneur de Thévalles, and Marshal of France. Her mother was Nicole du Plessis, the sister of Cardinal Richelieu. She had an older brother, Jean Armand de Maillé-Brézé, who became an Admiral of the French Royal Navy (La Royale).

Her mother, Nicole, began to suffer from the delusion that her bottom was made of glass. Claire-Clemence's father, losing interest in his wife began an affair with Madame Desvoirs, the wife of one of his servants. Claire-Clemence's mother would be incarcerated and died in 1635 when her daughter was seven years old.

In 1633 the plague broke out in Angers, and Claire-Clémence and her sister were sent to live with their great-aunts Simone de Maillé-Brézé, abbesse de Ronceray and Yvonne de Maillé-Brézé.

When she was five years old, her uncle, the Cardinal, arranged her betrothal to the French prince du sang, Louis de Bourbon, who would become the renowned general le Grand Condé, "the Great Condé." Under the pretext of educating her, she and her younger sister Marie-Francoise was taken from their family and entrusted to Mme Marie Bouthillier (née de Bragelogne), wife of the Superintendent of Finance. Therefore, Claire-Clémence grew up at Mme Bouthilliers home at Caves et du Mesnil-les-Pars in Champaigne. In Mme Bouthilliers care was also Anne de La Grange-Trianon.

It was said that Mme Bouthillier gave her a mediocre education. It was revealed that Claire-Clémence could not read or write very well, which was blamed on Mme Bouthillier not attending to her wards education properly.

In 1640, Claire Clémence was betrothed to Louis at Milly-le-Meugon. when she was twelve. It was noted that Claire-Clemence was still young enough to be playing with dolls while Louis, then the duc d'Enghien, was twenty years old and had already had several mistresses. In love at the time with Marthe Poussard (called Mlle du Vigean), he protested in vain against the marriage, but his father, Henri, Prince of Condé, forced him to wed Claire Clémence.

The year following her betrothal Claire-Clémence lived with her older cousin Marie Vignerod du Plessis in her home Petit Luxembourg in Paris. This was partly to give her time to mature but also to give her some social polish.

The marriage took place on 11 February 1641 at the Palais-Royal in Paris As she married a member of the reigning House of Bourbon, she became a Princess of the Blood and had the style Serene Highness. After his father's death in 1646, her husband became the First Prince of the Blood, which was the most important rank behind that of the members of the royal family.

The wedding ceremony was followed by festivities and a ball. The young Claire-Clémence wore a fine gown and jewels, as well as platform shoes, so as not to look comically short beside her tall husband. They proved however hard to walk in and Claire-Clémence would lose balance and fall to the floor, to the laughter of the guests.

Following the marriage her husband would neglect her in favour of Mlle de Vigean, which annoyed Claire-Clémence's uncle and he had Condé sent to Burgundy on the pretext of governing the lands.

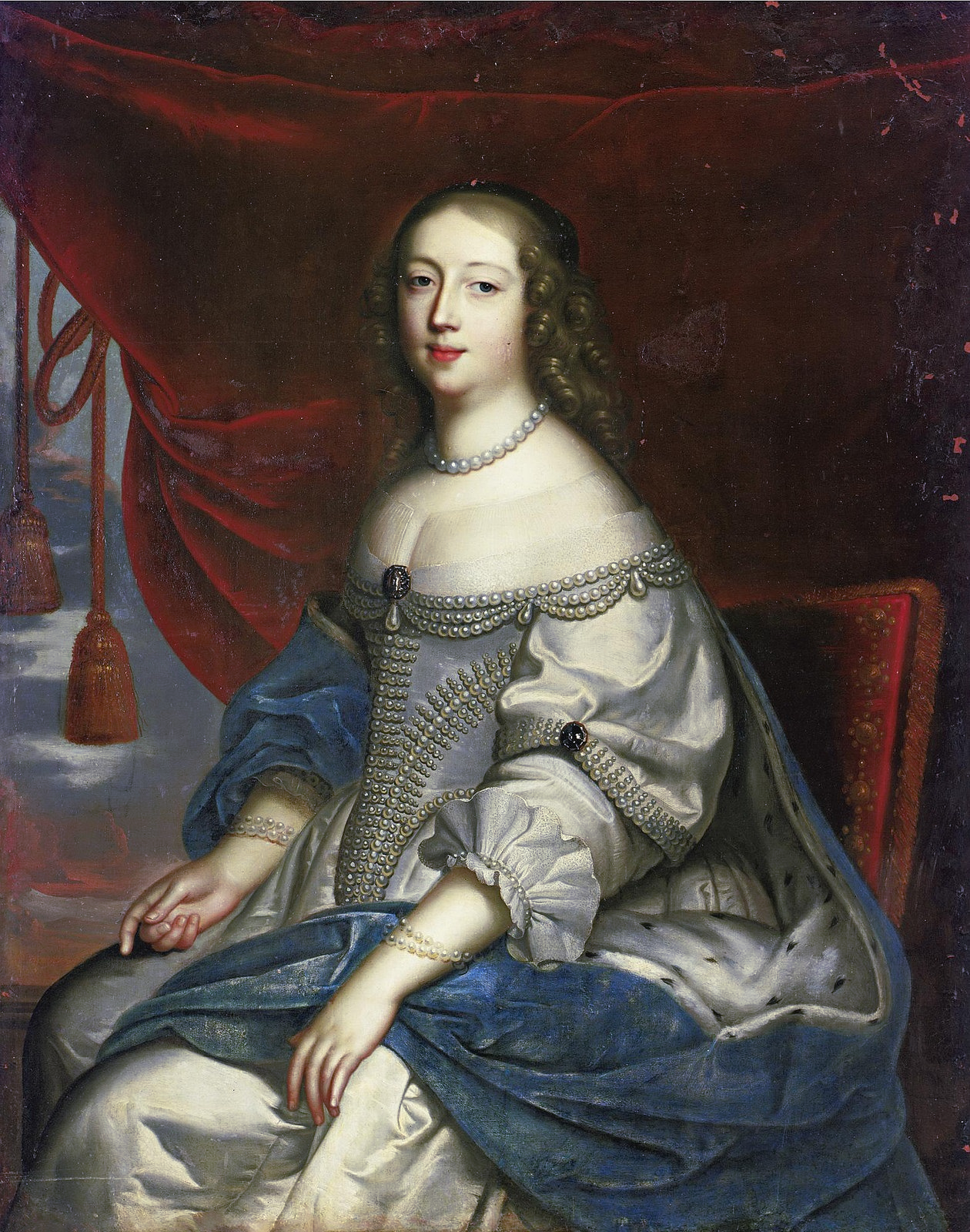
Portrait of a lady, thought to be Claire-Clémence or Anne Geneviève (formerly identified as Anne Marie Louise)

Meanwhile, Richelieu placed Claire-Clémence in the convent of Saint-Denis. She was accompanied by her mother-in-law Charlotte de Montmorency, her cousin the Duchess d`Aguillon, her sister-in-law the Duchess de Longueville and a Mlle de Croix. The reason given officially was that this was to keep the young duchess from getting into trouble, but it was also to attempt to give Claire-Clémence the education she had not been given in her foster mother's home.

While in Burgundy, Condé was paying little thought to his wife and entertained himself in order to spite his uncle by marriage the Cardinal Richelieu. When Condé was summoned by Richelieu, he did not hurry but took his time traveling until his father wrote to him asking him to obey the cardinals demand. Hurrying back he received a letter with the news that Claire-Clemence was ill and feeling guilty he went to visit his wife.

The marriage was consummated, and two years after their marriage the fifteen year old Claire Clémence would give birth to her first child, Henri Jules in 1643.

Conde was however away fighting during the birth of his first child during which time Claire-Clémence secluded herself in a Carmelite convent. Condé returned to France in 1645, this was the first time he saw his son.

Despite Claire-Clémence giving birth to a son and heir Condé would still not treat his wife with any kindness, and while he had given up his relationship with his mistress, he would seek out other women.

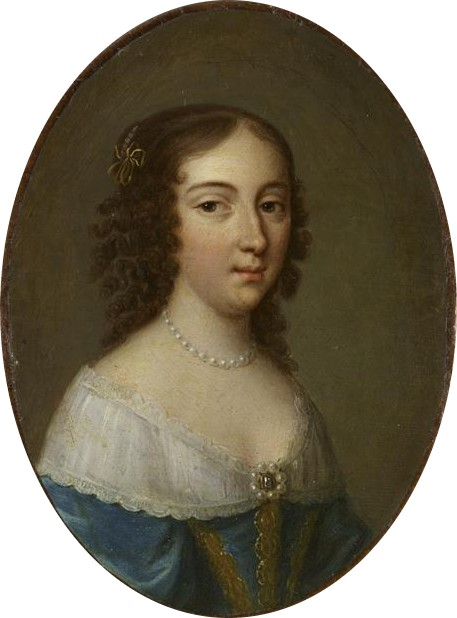
Portrait of Claire-Clémence attributed to Jean-Marie Ribou after Pierre Daret, c. 1776

Although Claire bore her husband three children, he later claimed she committed adultery with a number of different men in order to justify locking her away at Châteauroux, but the charge was widely disbelieved: Claude de Rouvroy, duc de Saint-Simon, who admitted that she was homely and dull, however praised her virtue, piety, and gentleness in the face of relentless abuse.

Upon her estranged husband's disgrace, arrest and imprisonment, in January 1650, at the fortress of Vincennes, after the Fronde, Claire Clémence distinguished herself by her energetic and devoted conduct, pursuing the struggle, raising his friends, leading them in danger and braving the king's anger, Mazarin's orders, and popular threats.

To get to the fortress of Montrond, the cardinal set out on a long journey from Bordeaux, via Poitou, Anjou and Touraine. She stopped him at Milly-le-Meugon, using his short stay to recruit her husband's friends from all parts. While Condé's faithful intendant, Lenet, came through France and Spain, and readied Montrond for a siege that would take the French army more than a year to raise, Claire Clémence gathered her faithful friends around her and gave splendid celebrations at Milly-le-Meugon in favour of all the organisers of the resistance during the Fronde. Despite her efforts, however, her husband remained imprisoned until 7 February 1651.

In 1651, Claire Clémence was forced to submit to the regent, Queen Anne of Austria, and to her minister, Mazarin.

She thus joined her husband in Spanish Flanders with their son. They only returned to favor in 1660, reinstalling themselves at the Château de Chantilly. However, when a scandal arose because of her liaison with a page, the Prince exiled his wife to the Château Raoul in Châteauroux, where she remained until her death in 1694. She saw the birth of her first grandchild, Marie Thérèse de Bourbon, Mademoiselle de Bourbon in 1666; her first great-grandchild, Marie Anne de Bourbon, Mademoiselle de Conti, was born in 1689, she later became Princess of Condé, the title that Claire Clémence held for some time.

Claire Clémence was buried at the Chapel of St Martin at the Château de Châteauroux, France.

== Issue ==
1. Henri Jules, Prince of Condé (29 July 1643, Paris – 1 April 1709, Paris), married Anne Henriette of Bavaria and had issue.
2. Louis de Bourbon, Duke of Bourbon (20 September 1652, Bordeaux – 11 April 1653, Bordeaux), died in infancy.
3. Mademoiselle de Bourbon (12 November 1657, Breda – 28 September 1660, Paris), died in childhood.

Her descendants include the present-day pretenders to the throne of France and Italy and the kings of Spain and Belgium.

== Portrayal in film ==
In the film Vatel, a 2000 film based on the life of 17th-century French chef François Vatel, directed by Roland Joffé and starring Gérard Depardieu, Uma Thurman, and Tim Roth. Claire Clémence is portrayed by Arielle Dombasle.

== Sources ==
- Bannister, Mark (2000). Condé in Context: Ideological Change in Seventeenth-century France. Legenda.
- Bergin, Joseph (1997). The Rise of Richelieu. Manchester University Press.
- Sturdy, David J. (2003). Richelieu and Mazarin: A Study in Statesmanship. Palgrave Macmillan.
