= List of senators of Maine-et-Loire =

Location of Maine-et-Loire in France

Following is a list of senators of Maine-et-Loire, people who have represented the department of Maine-et-Loire in the Senate of France.

== Third Republic ==
Senators for Maine-et-Loire under the French Third Republic were:

- Achille Alexandre Joubert-Bonnaire (1876–1883)
- Léon Le Guay (1876–1891)
- Henri d'Andigné (1876–1895)
- Aimé Blavier (1884–1896)
- Jules Merlet (1891–1920)
- Georges de Blois (1895–1906)
- Armand-Urbain de Maillé de La Tour-Landry (1896–1903)
- Guillaume Bodinier (1897–1922)
- Dominique Delahaye (1903–1932)
- Raoul de La Bourdonnaye (1906–1911)
- Fabien Cesbron (1911–1920)
- Jules Delahaye (1920–1925)
- Olivier de Rougé (1920–1932)
- Ferdinand Bougère (1932–1933)
- Louis de Blois, (1922–1940)
- Anatole Manceau (1925–1940)
- Georges Millin de Grandmaison (1933–1940)
- Palamède de La Grandière (1934–1940)

== Fourth Republic ==
Senators for Maine-et-Loire under the French Fourth Republic were:

- Jean Ascencio (1946–1948)
- Victor Chatenay (1948–1951)
- Emmanuel Clairefond (1946–1948)
- Étienne Rabouin (1948–1959)
- Pierre de Villoutreys de Brignac (1948–1959)
- Jean de Geoffre de Chabrignac (1951–1959)

== Fifth Republic ==
Senators for Maine-et-Loire under the French Fifth Republic:

In office	Name	Group	Notes
1959–1965	Pierre de Villoutreys de Brignac	Républicains et Indépendants	
1959–1965	Étienne Rabouin	Union pour la Nouvelle République	
1959–1965	Jean de Geoffre de Chabrignac	Union pour la Nouvelle République	
1965–1983	Jean Sauvage	Union Centriste des Démocrates de Progrès	
1965–1983	Lucien Gautier	Rassemblement pour la République	
1965–1974	Fernand Esseul	Républicains et Indépendants	
1974–1992	Auguste Chupin	Union Centriste	
1983–2001	Charles Jolibois	Républicains et Indépendants	
1983–1992	Jean Huchon	Union Centriste	
1992–2001	Jean-Paul Hugot	Rassemblement pour la République	
2001–2017	Daniel Raoul	Socialiste et républicain	
2001–2011	André Lardeux	Union pour un Mouvement Populaire	
2001–2010	Christian Gaudin	Union centriste	Mandate terminated 11 October 2010
2010–present	Catherine Deroche	Les Républicains	From 12 October 2010 in place of Christian Gaudin
2011–2017	Corinne Bouchoux	none	
2011–2017	Christophe Béchu	Les Républicains	
2017–present	Stéphane Piednoir	Les Républicains	
2017–present	Emmanuel Capus	Les Indépendants – République et Territoires	
2017–present	Joël Bigot	Socialiste et républicain	

== Sources ==
- Liste des anciens sénateurs de la IIIème République par circonscription (in French), Sénat de France
- Liste des anciens sénateurs de la IVème République par circonscription (in French), Sénat de France
- Liste des anciens sénateurs de la Vème République par circonscription (in French), Sénat de France
- Liste par département – Maine-et-Loire (in French), Sénat de France
