= Bellevigne-les-Châteaux =

- Commune
- Coat of arms
- Location of Bellevigne-les-Châteaux
- Location within France Location within Pays de la Loire
- Coordinates: 47°12′56″N 0°04′06″W
- Country: France
- Region: Pays de la Loire
- Department: Maine-et-Loire
- Arrondissement: Saumur
- Canton: Doué-en-Anjou
- Intercommunality: CA Saumur Val de Loire

Government
  - Mayor (2020–2026): Armel Froger
- Area^{1}: 35.10 km^{2} (13.55 sq mi)
- Highest elevation: 104 m (341 ft)
- Lowest elevation: 25 m (82 ft)
- Population (2023): 3,435
  - Density: 97.86/km^{2} (253.5/sq mi)
- Time zone: UTC+01:00 (CET)
  - Summer (DST): UTC+02:00 (CEST)
- INSEE/Postal code: 49060 /49400
- ^{1} French Land Register data, which excludes lakes, ponds, glaciers > 1 km^{2} (0.386 sq mi or 247 acres) and river estuaries.

Bellevigne-les-Châteaux (French pronunciation: [bɛlviɲ le ʃato]) is a commune in the Maine-et-Loire department in western France. It was established on 1 January 2019 by merger of the former communes of Chacé (the seat), Brézé and Saint-Cyr-en-Bourg.

== Population ==
Population data refer to the area corresponding with the commune as of January 2025.

Historical population
| Year | Pop. | ±% p.a. |
|---|---|---|
| 1968 | 2,445 | — |
| 1975 | 2,715 | +1.51% |
| 1982 | 3,449 | +3.48% |
| 1990 | 3,830 | +1.32% |
| 1999 | 3,678 | −0.45% |
| 2007 | 3,554 | −0.43% |
| 2012 | 3,589 | +0.20% |
| 2017 | 3,520 | −0.39% |
| 2023 | 3,435 | −0.41% |
Source: INSEE

== See also ==
- Communes of the Maine-et-Loire department
