= Urbain de Maillé, 1st Marquis of Brézé =

17th-century French commander

Urbain de Maillé 1st Marquis of Brézé
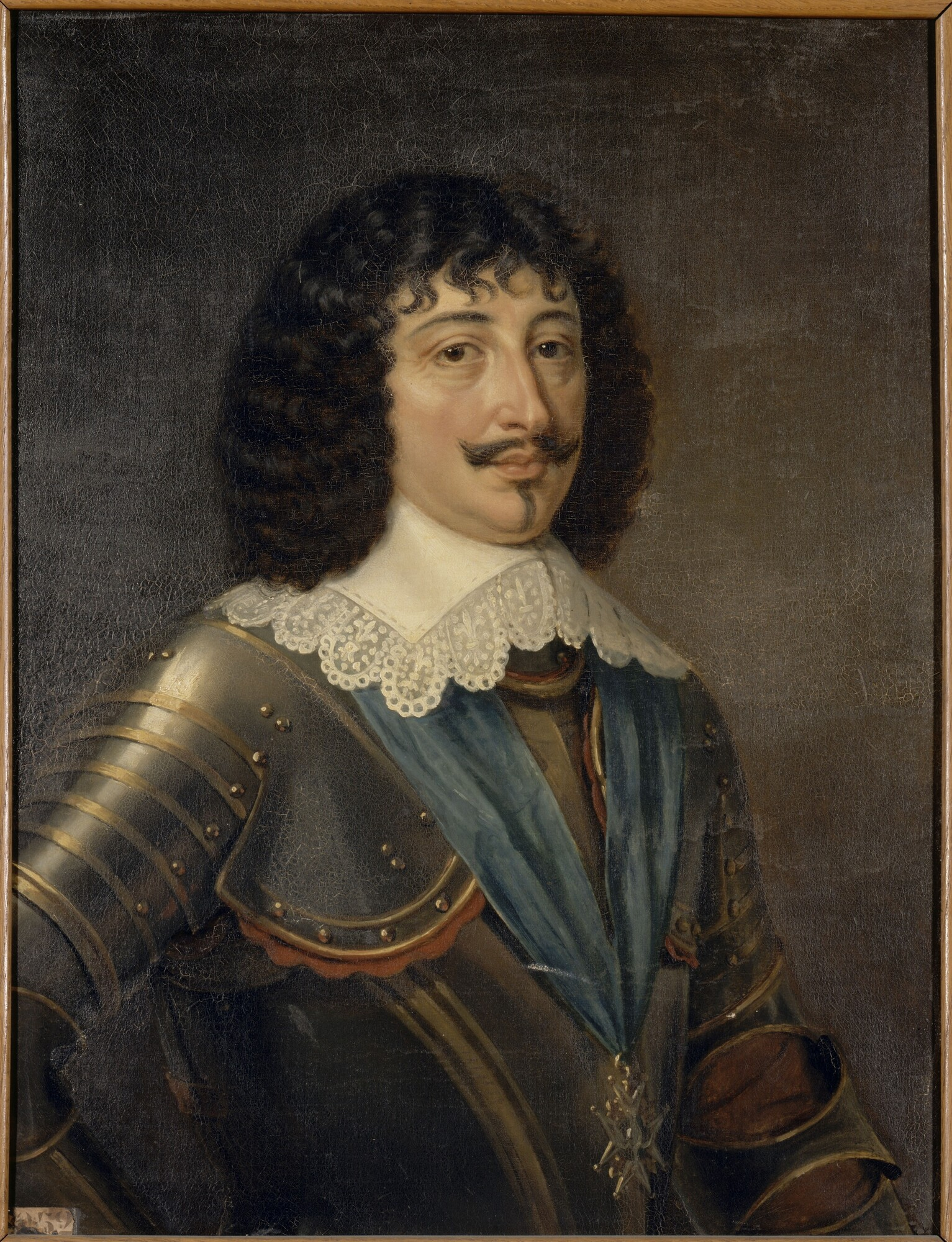
- 1835 portrait by Jérôme-Martin Langlois, commissioned by King Louis Philippe I
- Born: 30 March 1598; Brézé, Maine-et-Loire {(then in the Province of Anjou)
- Died: 13 February 1650 (aged 51); Milly-le-Meugon, Maine-et-Loire
- Burial place: St Pierre church, Milly-le-Meugon
- Military career
- Allegiance: France
- Service years: 1620–1642
- Rank: Marshal of France
- Nickname: le maréchal de Brézé
- Commands: Governor of Saumur 1626; Governor of Calais 1632; French Viceroy of Catalonia, 1641–1642
- Conflicts: Huguenot rebellions • Siege of La Rochelle • Siege of Saint-Martin-de-Ré; War of the Mantuan Succession • Battle of Castelnaudary; Franco-Spanish War • Battle of Les Avins • Siege of Leuven • Siege of Turin; Catalan Revolt • Battle of Montmeló • Battle of Lleida
- Awards: Order of the Holy Spirit
- Other work: Ambassador to Sweden 1632

Urbain de Maillé, 1st Marquis of Brézé (French pronunciation: [yʁbɛ̃ də maje bʁeze]) (1597 – 13 February 1650), was a 17th-century French soldier and diplomat, who was a Marshal of France, Ambassador to Sweden in 1632, and Viceroy of Catalonia 1641 to 1642.

His marriage to the younger sister of Cardinal Richelieu, French chief minister from 1624 to 1642, brought success and enormous wealth. His son held a number of senior naval positions, and his daughter married Louis, Grand Condé. He lost office following Richelieu's death in December 1642, and spent the rest of his life on his estates in Milly-le-Meugon, where he died on 13 February 1650.

== Early life ==
Urbain de Maillé-Brézé was born in 1597, to Charles de Maillé (1568-1613), Seigneur of Brézé, and Jacqueline de Thévalle. His parents were first cousins. His father was described as an 'écuyer', an indication that he belonged to the nobility; two years after his death in 1615, Jacqueline purchased the title of Marquis.

== Career ==
While his marriage guaranteed the recognition essential for a successful career, Maillé-Brézé was also a competent soldier. In 1620, he was appointed commander of Marie de' Medici's personal guard; during the 1622 to 1630 Huguenot rebellions, he was present at the sieges of La Rochelle and Saint-Martin-de-Ré.

During the 1628 to 1631 War of the Mantuan Succession, in March 1629, he was part of a famous action when the French stormed barricades blocking the Pas de Suse. By the end of the month, they had lifted the siege of Casale Monferrato and taken the strategic fortress of Pinerolo.

Maillé fought in many battles. He participated in the Siege of La Rochelle (1627–1628). In 1635 he conquered Heidelberg and Speyer, together with Jacques-Nompar de Caumont, duc de la Force, at the head of the Army of Germany.

In 1635 he was put, together with Gaspard III de Coligny, at the head of the French army that invaded Flanders. They were victorious at the Battle of Les Avins against the Spanish, but the Siege of Leuven was a complete failure.

In 1641, together with duc de la Meilleraye, he conquered Lens in 3 days, Aire-sur-la-Lys (August) and Bapaume (September).

After these successes Maillé was made Viceroy of newly conquered Catalonia. He attempted to drive the Spanish from Collioure, Perpignan and Sainte-Marie, but failed. In May 1642, he was replaced and retired from active duty. He lost office following Richelieu's death in December 1642, and spent the rest of his life at his château in Milly-le-Meugon. His son was killed at Orbetello in June 1646, and buried in the local church, as was Maillé-Brézé, when he died on 13 February 1650.

== Personal life ==
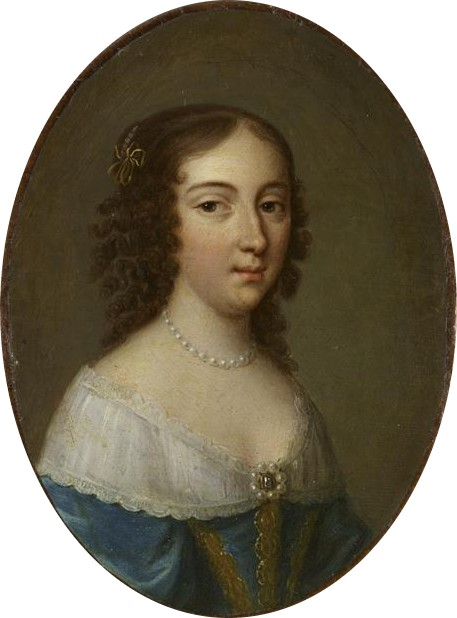
Claire Clémence de Maillé, Urbain's daughter who married Prince of Condé

In 1617, he married Nicole du Plessis (1587–1635), younger sister of Cardinal Richelieu, French chief minister 1624 to 1642. They had two children:

- Jean Armand de Maillé-Brézé, (1619–1646), who became an admiral and succeeded his uncle as Duke of Fronsac.
- Claire Clémence de Maillé, (1628–1694), who married the Prince of Condé (1621-1686). Despite an enormous dowry, Condé deeply resented a forced marriage to someone he considered a social inferior.

Maillé-Brézé died at his Château de Milly-le-Meugon on 13 February 1650 and was buried in the local church there.

== Sources ==
- Thion, Stéphane (2013). French Armies of the Thirty Years' War. Histoire et Collections. ISBN 978-2917747018.
- Tucker, Spencer C., ed. (2011). A Global Chronology of Conflict: From the Ancient World to the Modern Middle East. Vol. II. ABC-CLIO.
