= Milly-le-Meugon =

Coordinates: 47°17′12″N 0°15′11.5″W

Milly-le-Meugon is a village now attached to the city of Gennes, Maine-et-Loire department, France. It is also the site of a castle, which also belonged to the Maillé-Brézé family, a notable family of the French nobility with close ties to King Louis XIII's powerful minister, the Cardinal Richelieu, and to King Louis XIV's first cousin le Grand Condé.

== Overview ==
Among this family's best-known members are Claire-Clémence de Maillé-Brézé and her brother, Jean Armand de Maillé-Brézé, grand maître de la navigation (an equivalent to Grand Admiral). Their father, Urbain de Maillé-Brézé, 2nd marquis de Brézé and Marshal of France, had married Richelieu's sister. Claire-Clémence married the Grand Condé, thus becoming a French princess. Her brother, the duke of Fronsac, was one of the most heroic figures of the time; both of them were born at Milly. The duke of Fronsac is buried with his father in the church of Milly.

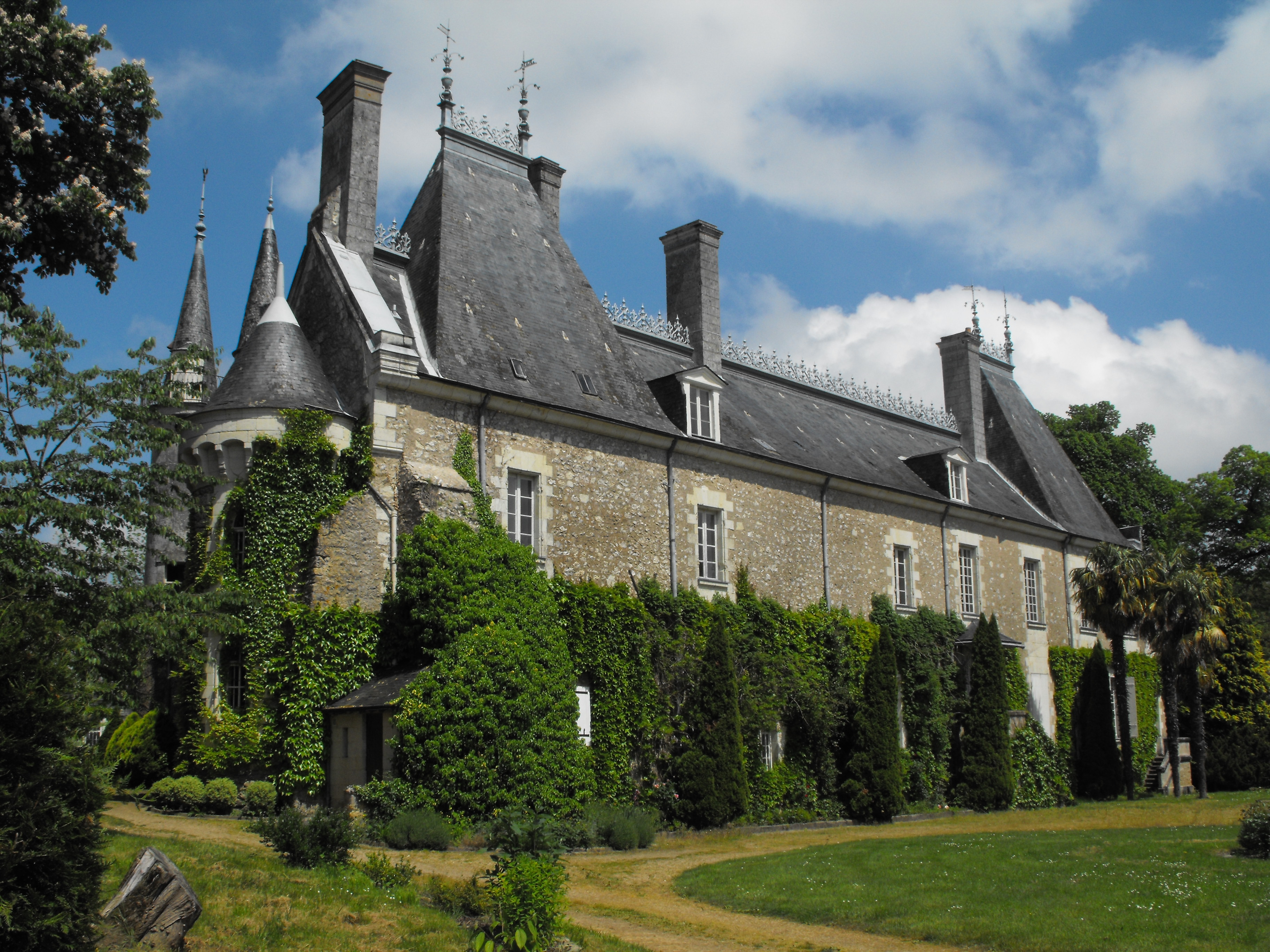
The castle of Milly le Meugon

The whole precincts of the castle are classified as monument historique (historical national monument): the ruined medieval keep and walls (inner bailey) date from the 13th-14th centuries. The outer bailey main gate (partially rusticated in vermiculated fashion), the monumental stable and walls were all erected during the French Renaissance; the later castle main building, in Italian Renaissance style (with its gate of honor), dates partly from the late 16th century, but was completely reshaped in 1835 by a German architect, Svenberg.
