= Vatel (film) =

- Theatrical release poster
- Directed by: Roland Joffé
- Written by: Jeanne Labrune; Tom Stoppard
- Produced by: Roland Joffé; Alain Goldman
- Starring: Gérard Depardieu; Uma Thurman; Tim Roth
- Cinematography: Robert Fraisse
- Edited by: Noëlle Boisson
- Music by: Ennio Morricone
- Production companies: Gaumont; Légende Entreprises; Canal+; Nomad Films; TF1 Films Production; Timothy Burrill Productions
- Distributed by: Gaumont Buena Vista International (France); Miramax International (through Buena Vista International, United Kingdom)
- Release dates: May 2000 (Cannes); 10 May 2000 (Belgium); 25 December 2000 (USA)
- Running time: 103 minutes
- Countries: France; United Kingdom
- Language: English
- Box office: $51,080 (US)

Vatel is a 2000 historical drama film directed by Roland Joffé, written by Jeanne Labrune and translated by Tom Stoppard, and starring Gérard Depardieu, Uma Thurman, Tim Roth, Timothy Spall, Julian Glover and Julian Sands. The film, based on the life of 17th-century French chef François Vatel, was nominated for an Academy Award for Best Art Direction. The film opened the 2000 Cannes Film Festival.

== Plot ==
The story takes place in 1671. In the context of the Franco-Dutch War, a financially struggling prince of Condé is visited by King Louis XIV for three days of festivities at the Château de Chantilly. The prince wants a commission as an army General, and spares no expense in order to impress the king. In charge of organizing the event is François Vatel, Master of Festivities and Pleasures in the prince's household. Vatel is a man of great honor and talent, but of low birth.

As the prince is prepared to do anything in his quest for stature, the tasks assigned to Vatel are often menial and dishonourable. While Vatel tries to maintain his dignity amidst the extravaganza he is meant to orchestrate, he finds himself in love with Anne de Montausier, the king's latest lover, who returns his affections. However, due to their incompatible social standing and the rigid hierarchy of the court, continuing the liaison is clearly impossible.

In the last day of the king's visit, Vatel realizes that he is nothing more than a puppet in the hands of his superiors, bought and sold like a piece of property, after learning that the Prince of Condé has "lost" him in a card game with the king. Though Condé considers Vatel a friend and was reluctant to let go of him, he found himself pressured by the king's Entourage and the king's eagerness to have Vatel working for him (as well as his desire to be an army commander once again) and now has to carry his promise; he communicates Vatel through a servant that he will have to go with the king to Versailles as part of the Royal Court. Disheartened with the news, Vatel refuses to leave his people (the servants of the Château) and go to work for the king. Soon after Vatel commits suicide by throwing himself on his sword.

Nevertheless, the king is told by his own court members that Vatel killed himself because the roast was not sufficient to feed several unexpected guests, the clouds dulled the fireworks display and he lacked confidence that there would be enough fish for the morning meal. This explanation pleases the king very much. Anne de Montausier is grief-stricken upon hearing the news, but knows she must not speak of it. She leaves the court quietly, and no one ever hears about her and Vatel again.

== Cast ==
- Gérard Depardieu as François Vatel
- Uma Thurman as Anne de Montausier
- Tim Roth as Marquis of Lauzun
- Timothy Spall as Gourville
- Julian Glover as Louis de Bourbon, Prince of Condé, "Grand Condé"
- Julian Sands as Louis XIV
- Murray Lachlan Young as Philippe of France, Duke of Orléans, "Monsieur", brother of King Louis XIV.
- Hywel Bennett as Colbert
- Richard Griffiths as Dr. Bourdelot
- Arielle Dombasle as Claire Clémence de Maillé, "Princess of Condé"
- Marine Delterme as Madame de Montespan, mistress of King Louis XIV.
- Philippine Leroy-Beaulieu as Anne Geneviève de Bourbon, "Duchess of Longueville"
- Jérôme Pradon as Marquis of Effiat, lover of the Monsieur.
- Féodor Atkine as Alcalet
- Nathalie Cerda as Marie Thérèse of Austria, wife of King Louis XIV.
- Emilie Ohana as Louise de la Vallière, another mistress of the king.
- Sébastien Davis as Demaury
- Louis Bustin as Martin
- Vincent Grass as Martin's Father
- Julie-Anne Roth as The maidservant

== Reception ==
Rotten Tomatoes, a review aggregator, reports that 31% of 32 surveyed critics gave the film a positive review; the average rating is 4.6/10. The site's consensus reads: "Visually sumptuous, but unengaging." Metacritic rated it 44/100 based on 13 reviews, indicating "mixed or average reviews". David Stratton of Variety wrote, "Vatel, a no-expense-spared costumer, is further proof that all the money and technical expertise in the world are no substitutes for a good screenplay and creative direction." Elvis Mitchell of The New York Times called the film "a costume drama with far more costumes than drama". Kevin Thomas of the Los Angeles Times called it "a timeless tale of love and sacrifice in a world as opulent as it is cruel."
