= Chacé =

- Part of Bellevigne-les-Châteaux
- Coat of arms
- Location of Chacé
- Location within France Location within Pays de la Loire
- Coordinates: 47°12′56″N 0°04′06″W
- Country: France
- Region: Pays de la Loire
- Department: Maine-et-Loire
- Arrondissement: Saumur
- Canton: Saumur
- Commune: Bellevigne-les-Châteaux
- Area^{1}: 6.42 km^{2} (2.48 sq mi)
- Elevation: 39 m (128 ft)
- Highest elevation: 73 m (240 ft)
- Lowest elevation: 25 m (82 ft)
- Population (2022): 1,437
  - Density: 224/km^{2} (580/sq mi)
- Demonym(s): Chacéen, Chacéenne
- Time zone: UTC+01:00 (CET)
  - Summer (DST): UTC+02:00 (CEST)
- Postal code: 49400
- ^{1} French Land Register data, which excludes lakes, ponds, glaciers > 1 km^{2} (0.386 sq mi or 247 acres) and river estuaries.

Chacé (French pronunciation: [ʃase]) is a former commune in the Maine-et-Loire department in western France. On 1 January 2019, it was merged into the new commune Bellevigne-les-Châteaux.

== See also ==
- Communes of the Maine-et-Loire department
