= Saint-Cyr-en-Bourg =

- Part of Bellevigne-les-Châteaux
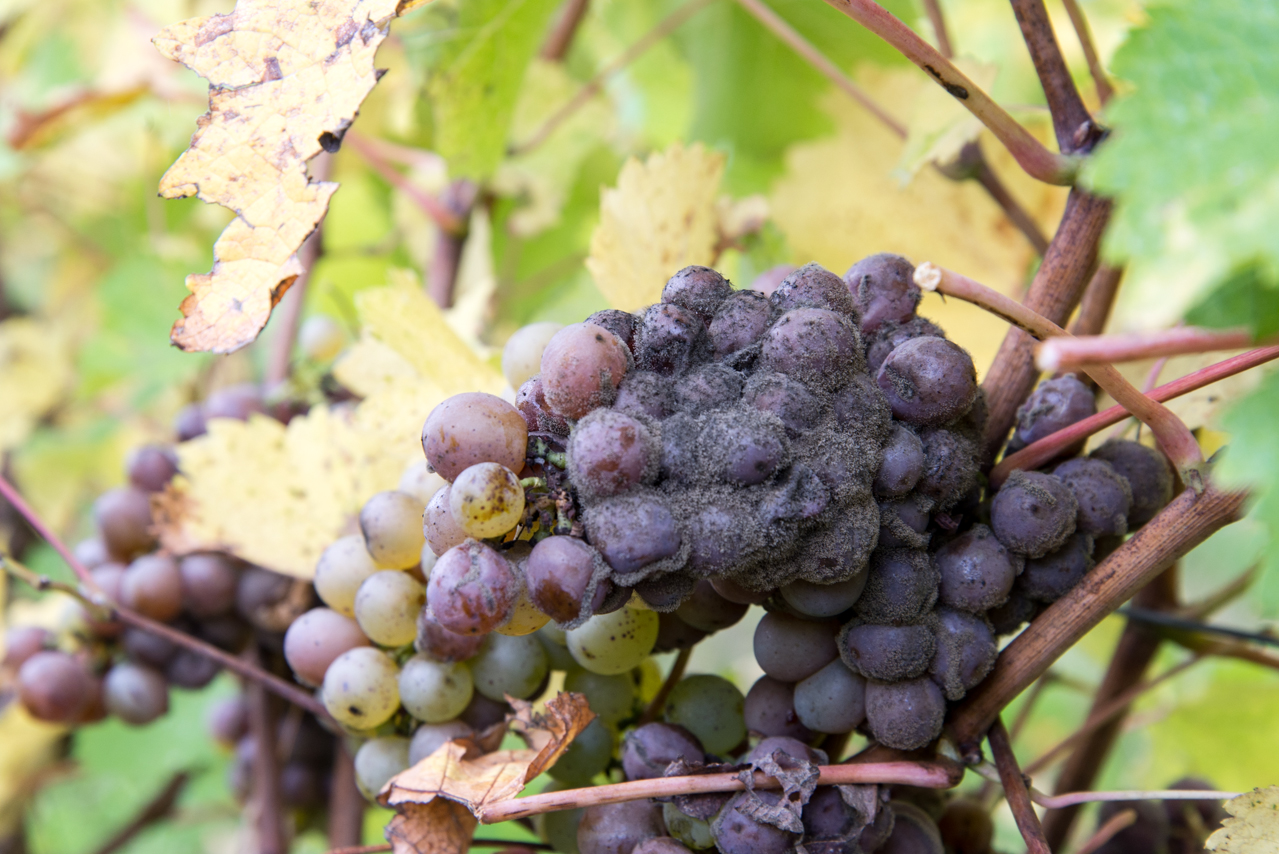
- Chenin blanc grapes growing in Saint-Cyr-en-Bourg
- Location of Saint-Cyr-en-Bourg
- Location within France Location within Pays de la Loire
- Coordinates: 47°11′38″N 0°03′32″W
- Country: France
- Region: Pays de la Loire
- Department: Maine-et-Loire
- Arrondissement: Saumur
- Canton: Doué-la-Fontaine
- Commune: Bellevigne-les-Châteaux
- Area^{1}: 8.63 km^{2} (3.33 sq mi)
- Elevation: 51 m (167 ft)
- Highest elevation: 104 m (341 ft)
- Lowest elevation: 30 m (98 ft)
- Population (2022): 836
  - Density: 96.9/km^{2} (251/sq mi)
- Time zone: UTC+01:00 (CET)
  - Summer (DST): UTC+02:00 (CEST)
- Postal code: 49260
- ^{1} French Land Register data, which excludes lakes, ponds, glaciers > 1 km^{2} (0.386 sq mi or 247 acres) and river estuaries.

Saint-Cyr-en-Bourg (French pronunciation: [sɛ̃ siʁ ɑ̃ buʁ]) is a former commune in the Maine-et-Loire department in western France. On 1 January 2019, it was merged into the new commune Bellevigne-les-Châteaux.

== See also ==
- Communes of the Maine-et-Loire department
