= Battle of Les Avins =

1635 battle of the Franco-Spanish War

Coordinates: 50.4000°N 5.2830°E

- Part of the Franco-Spanish War (1635–59)
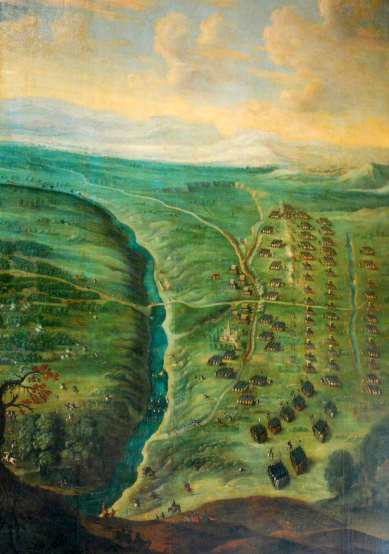
- Battle site; Spanish forces at left, French below
Date	20 May 1635
Location	Les Avins, near Huy, modern Belgium
Result	French victory

Belligerents
France	Spain

Commanders and leaders
Urbain de Maillé-Brezé; Gaspard de Châtillon; Charles de La Porte; Philippe de La Mothe-Houdancourt	Carignano; Count of Bucquoy; Count Feria (POW)

Strength
26,500–34,000	c. 16,000

Casualties and losses
3,000 dead or wounded	4,000–5,000 dead, wounded, or captured

The Battle of Les Avins (Note: Also referred to as Avein) took place on 20 May 1635, outside the town of Les Avins, near Huy in modern Belgium, then part of the Bishopric of Liège. It was the first major engagement of the 1635 to 1659 Franco-Spanish War, a connected conflict of the Thirty Years' War.

Prior to 1635, France had provided financial and diplomatic support for the Dutch Republic in its war of independence from Spain, but avoided direct involvement. In February 1635, the two countries agreed to divide the Spanish Netherlands, and following a formal declaration of war, a French army of 27,000 entered Liège in May.

Intending to link up with the Dutch at Maastricht and attack Leuven, they ran into a Spanish force of around 16,000 outside Les Avins. The French made a series of frontal assaults and eventually over-ran their positions, forcing the Spanish to retreat.

== Background ==
17th century Europe was dominated by the struggle between the Bourbon kings of France, and their Habsburg rivals in Spain and the Holy Roman Empire. In 1938, historian CV Wedgwood argued the 1618 to 1648 Thirty Years War and the 1568 to 1648 Dutch revolt formed part of a wider, ongoing European struggle, with the Habsburg-Bourbon conflict at its centre. A view now generally accepted by modern historians, this makes the Franco-Spanish War a connected conflict, which is essential to understanding strategic objectives.

Habsburg territories in the Spanish Netherlands, Franche-Comté, and the Pyrenees blocked French expansion, and made it vulnerable to invasion. Occupied by domestic Huguenot rebellions from 1622 to 1630, France looked for opportunities to weaken the Habsburgs, while avoiding direct conflict. This included supporting the Dutch against Spain, and financing Swedish intervention in the Empire, starting in 1630, when Gustavus Adolphus of Sweden invaded Pomerania.

Much of the fighting focused on the Spanish Road, a key strategic supply route for Spanish troops in Flanders Purple: Spanish dependencies Green: Ruled by Austria Brown: Ruled by Spain

When fighting restarted at the end of the Twelve Years' Truce in 1621, the Spanish initially won a series of victories but by 1633 were on the retreat. The powerful Amsterdam mercantile lobby saw this as an opportunity to end the war on favourable terms, and although negotiations ended without result, the Dutch peace party grew in strength. At the same time, defeat at Nördlingen in September 1634 forced the Swedes to retreat, while most of their German allies left the war after the 1635 Treaty of Prague.

Concerned by the prospect of the Habsburgs making peace on favourable terms in both the Empire and the Netherlands, Louis XIII and his chief minister Richelieu decided on direct intervention. In February 1635, they signed an alliance with the Dutch, agreeing to divide the Spanish Netherlands, followed in April by the Treaty of Compiègne with Sweden.

Much of the fighting focused on different parts of the Spanish Road, an overland supply route connecting Spanish possessions in Northern Italy to Flanders. After 1601, it was rarely used for moving soldiers, but remained vital for trade, and went through areas essential to French security. At the start of 1635, France had a total of around 100,000 men under arms, including 27,000 men under Urbain de Maillé-Brézé in Picardy and additional armies in Champagne, Lorraine, the Sarre, and the Valtellina. This allowed them to threaten the Road at a number of points, but the 1635 campaign showed their logistics were inadequate to support these numbers, while there was very little co-ordination between the different theatres.

== Battle ==
In May, Louis XIII declared war on Spain, claiming to be responding to a request for support from the Elector of Trier, whose territories were an important part of the Road and had been occupied by Spanish troops. The French entered the Prince-Bishopric of Liège, last point in the Road, in two divisions, one led by Maillé-Brézé and the other by Châtillon. Their intention was to link up with Dutch forces based at Maastricht, under Frederick Henry, Prince of Orange, and then attack Leuven. Outside Les Avins, they made contact with a Spanish force of around 16,000, (Note: A contemporary Spanish source suggests 7,000 infantry and 2,500 cavalry) commanded by Thomas Francis, Prince of Carignano and his deputies Bucquoy and Count Feria. (Note: Not to be confused with the Duke of Feria, who died of dysentery in 1634; the Count was described by a colleague as a "pumpkin", who retained his position only because he was Spanish)

1635 campaign in Northern France and the Spanish Netherlands (modern borders shown)

The Spanish had been ordered to simply act as a blocking force but Carignano allowed himself to be drawn into battle with a larger army. Although inferior in numbers, his troops were more experienced and held a strong position, with the infantry placed behind a series of hedges and artillery covering the approaches. The French commanders debated whether to attack, before deciding retreat would be more dangerous. Their artillery commander, Charles de La Porte, positioned his guns to provide covering fire; Châtillon and Maillé-Brézé drew up their troops in standard formation, infantry in the centre and cavalry on the wings, before launching a frontal assault.

On the right, Maillé-Brézé was initially repulsed with heavy losses, before rallying and attacking again. On the left and centre, Châtillon attacked the Spanish artillery with 4,000 men and eventually over-ran their positions by weight of numbers. Seeing this, the French reserve of 5,000 came up and assuming this to be a new army, Carignano ordered a general retreat. Most of the Spanish casualties occurred in this phase of the battle; estimates range from a total of 4,000, to 5,000 including prisoners, among them Charles of Austria, nephew of Emperor Ferdinand and Feria. French losses were around 3,000, mostly incurred in their assault.

== Aftermath ==
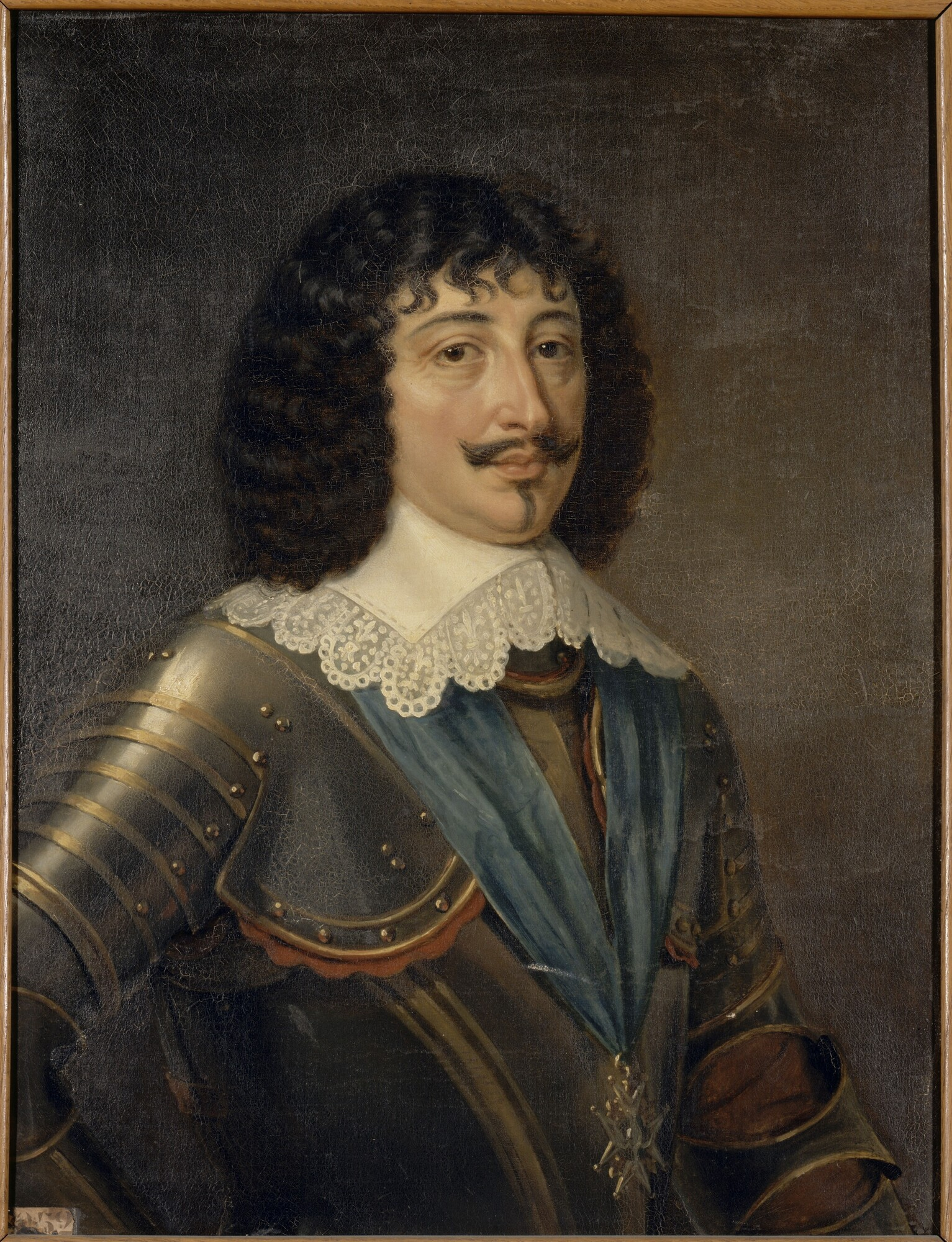
Urbain de Maillé-Brezé (1597–1650); French commander

News of the victory was received in Paris with elation, and led to unrealistic optimism about the rest of the campaign. It also caused friction between the French commanders, with Châtillon claiming he had been sidelined to ensure Maillé-Brézé won the glory.

After linking up with the Dutch, their combined force totalled around 45,000 men, but Fredrick Henry insisted on taking Tienen, a place of limited strategic value. Cardinal-Infante Ferdinand of Austria, governor of the Spanish Netherlands, withdrew to Leuven, leaving a garrison of 1,200 at Tienen. When captured on 10 June, the town was sacked, over 200 civilians killed and many buildings damaged, including Catholic churches and monasteries. This atrocity undermined efforts to win over the predominately Catholic population of the Southern Netherlands and was particularly embarrassing for Richelieu, a Cardinal in the Catholic church.

Until the advent of railways in the 19th century, water was the primary means of bulk transportation; Leuven's position on the River Dyle made its capture essential for an offensive into Brabant. By the time the Franco-Dutch army began the siege on 24 June, desertion due to lack of food or pay had reduced the French army to under 17,000. When a Spanish force advanced on Leuven in early July, the siege was abandoned; on 28 July, the loss of the Dutch fortress of Schenkenschans prompted Frederick Henry to withdraw from the Spanish Netherlands and march to its relief.

== Sources ==
- Asbach, Olaf; Schröder, Peter (2014). The Dutch-French Invasion, 1635–1646 in The Ashgate Research Companion to the Thirty Years' War. Ashgate. ISBN 978-1409406297.
- Bodart, Gaston (1908). Militär-historisches Kriegs-Lexikon (1618–1905).
- del Valle, José León Sancho Rayón (1911). Varias relaciones de los estados de Flandes, 1631 á 1656 (in Spanish). Libos españoles raros y curiosos (1631–1656).
- Forsberg, Anna Maria (2016). Story of War: Church & Propaganda in France & Sweden in 1610–1710. Nordic Academic Press. ISBN 978-9188168665.
- Guthrie, William (2003). The Later Thirty Years War: From the Battle of Wittstock to the Treaty of Westphalia. Greenwood Press. ISBN 0-313-32408-5.
- Hayden, J Michael (1973). "Continuity in the France of Henry IV and Louis XIII: French Foreign Policy, 1598-1615". The Journal of Modern History. 45 (1): 1–23. doi:10.1086/240888. JSTOR 1877591. S2CID 144914347.
- Israel, Jonathan (1995). Spain in the Low Countries, (1635-1643) in Spain, Europe and the Atlantic: Essays in Honour of John H. Elliott. Cambridge University Press. ISBN 978-0521470452.
- Knox, Bill (2017). "The 1635 Treaty of Prague; a failed settlement?". In Tucker, Spencer (ed.). Enduring Controversies in Military History, Volume I: Critical Analyses and Context. Greenwood Press. ISBN 978-1440841194.
- Lasaffer, Randall (2006). "Siege Warfare and the Early Modern Laws of War". Tilburg Working Paper Series on Jurisprudence and Legal History. 06 (1).
- León, Fernando González de (2009). The Road to Rocroi: Class, Culture and Command in the Spanish Army of Flanders, 1567-1659. Brill. ISBN 978-9004170827.
- Parrott, David (2001). Richelieu's Army: War, Government and Society in France, 1624–1642. Cambridge University Press. ISBN 978-0521792097.
- Périni, Hardÿ de (1896). Batailles françaises, Volume III (in French). Ernest Flammarion.
- Poot, Anton (2013). Crucial years in Anglo-Dutch relations (1625–1642): the political and diplomatic contacts. Uitgeverij Verloren. ISBN 978-9087043803.
- Sutherland, NM (1992). "The Origins of the Thirty Years War and the Structure of European Politics". English Historical Review. 107 (424).
- Thion, Stephane (2013). French Armies of the Thirty Years War (Soldiers of the Past). Histoire et Collections. ISBN 978-2917747018.
- Wedgwood, CV (1938). The Thirty Years War (2005 ed.). New York Review of Books. ISBN 978-1590171462.
- Wilson, Charles (1976). Transformation of Europe, 1558-1648. Littlehampton Book Services. ISBN 978-0297770152.
