= Christophe Béchu =

French politician (born 1974)

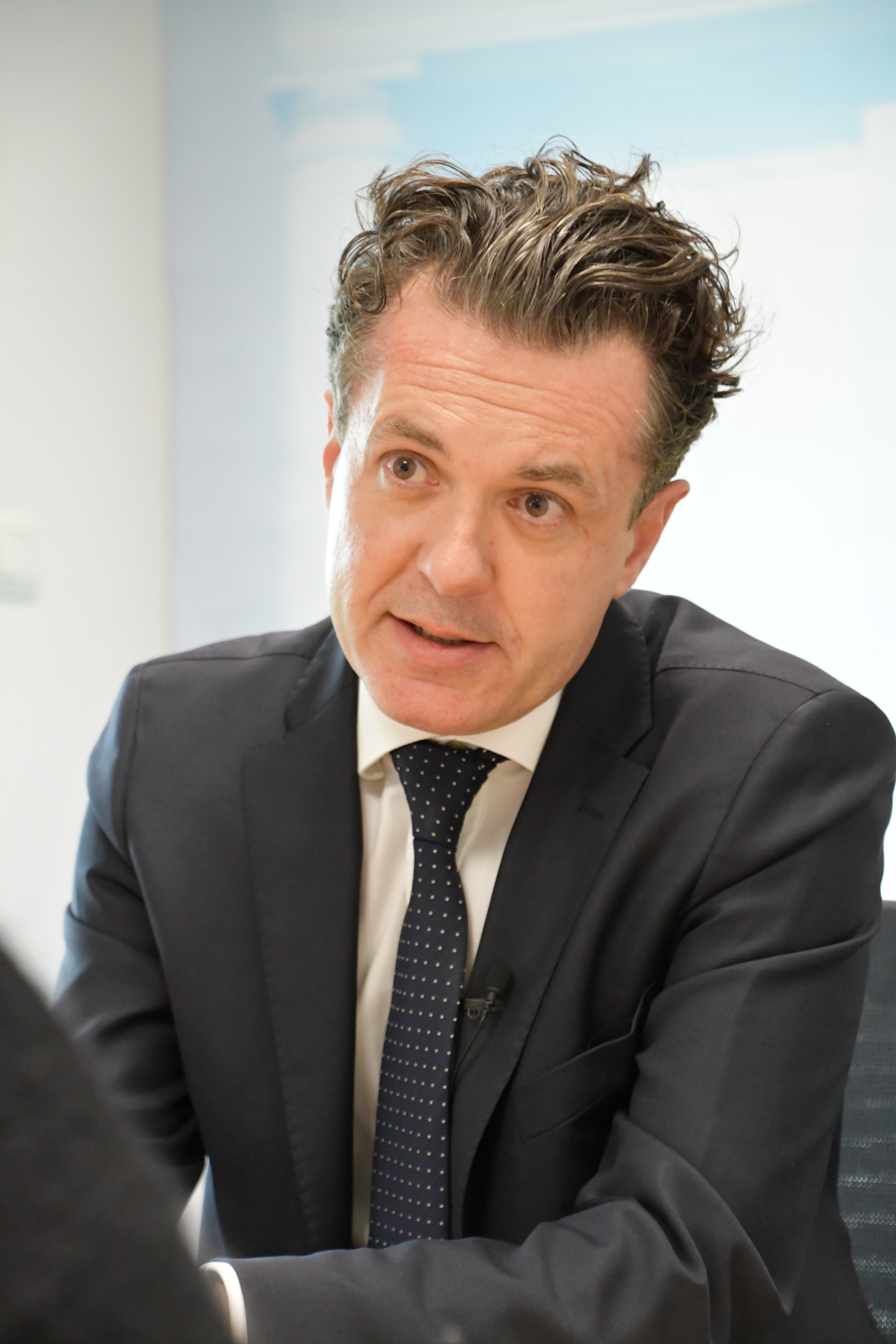
- Béchu in 2023

Minister for Ecological Transition and Cohesion of the Territories
- In office 4 July 2022 – 21 September 2024
- Prime Minister: Élisabeth Borne; Gabriel Attal
- Preceded by: Amélie de Montchalin
- Succeeded by: Agnès Pannier-Runacher (Ecological Transition); Catherine Vautrin (Territories)

Minister for Relations with Local Authorities
- In office 20 May 2022 – 4 July 2022
- Prime Minister: Élisabeth Borne
- Preceded by: Joël Giraud

Mayor of Angers
- In office 4 April 2014 – 18 July 2022
- Preceded by: Frédéric Béatse
- Succeeded by: Jean-Marc Verchère

Member of the French Senate for Maine-et-Loire
- In office 1 October 2011 – 1 October 2017
- Preceded by: André Lardeux

Personal details
- Born: 11 June 1974 (age 52) Angers, France
- Party: Horizons (2021–present)
- Other political affiliations: UMP (before 2015); The Republicans (2015–2017)
- Education: Sciences Po

Christophe Béchu (French pronunciation: [kʁistɔf beʃy]; born 11 June 1974) is a French politician who served as Minister for Ecological Transition and Cohesion of the Territories in the governments of successive Prime Ministers Élisabeth Borne and Gabriel Attal from 2022 to 2024.

Béchu previously was the President of the General Council of the Maine-et-Loire department from 2004 to 2014. He briefly served as a Member of the European Parliament from 2009 until 2011, representing the West France constituency. A former member of the centre-right Union for a Popular Movement, later the Republicans (LR), and the DL, Béchu became the secretary general of Horizons in 2021.

== Political career ==
Béchu has represented the Canton of Angers-Nord-Ouest since 2001, and was re-elected there during the 2008 French cantonal elections. However, he was narrowly defeated by the incumbent PS mayor of Angers, Jean-Claude Antonini, in the 2008 municipal elections.

=== Member of the European Parliament, 2009–2011 ===
In 2009, the UMP selected him to lead the UMP list in the West constituency ahead of the 2009 European elections. He was elected to the European Parliament as a result. His list won 27.16% of the vote and three MEPs. In parliament, he served on the Committee on Agriculture and Rural Development. In addition to his committee assignments, he was part of the parliament's delegation for relations with Japan. He resigned in January 2011.

Béchu lost the regional election of 2010 to become President of Pays de la Loire region, but was elected as a regional councillor. In the 2011 elections, he was elected as a Senator of Maine-et-Loire, and thereafter resigned from regional council of Pays-de-Loire.

=== Mayor of Angers, 2014–2022 ===
During the 2014 French municipal elections, Béchu competed against Frédéric Béatse, incumbent, and became the new mayor of Angers on 4 April 2014. Béchu was re-elected in 2020.

In 2016, Béchu caused controversy when he requested the removal of posters that had been installed as part of a governmental HIV/AIDS prevention campaign "not to expose a young public to a message they cannot understand“; at the time, Minister of Health Marisol Touraine denounced Béchu as "homophobe."

=== Career in government ===
Béchu briefly served as Minister of Relations with Local Authorities from 20 May to 4 July 2022.

In October 2023, Béchu participated in the first joint cabinet retreat of the German and French governments in Hamburg, chaired by Chancellor Olaf Scholz and President Emmanuel Macron.

=== Later career ===
In 2026, Béchu joined the leadership team for Édouard Philippe’s 2027 presidential campaign, alongside Marie Guévenoux and Gilles Boyer.

== Other activities ==
- Agence de financement des infrastructures de transport de France (AFITF), chair of the board of directors
- Dexia Crédit Local, member of the board of directors (2007–2009)

== Political positions ==
In 2019, Béchu publicly declared his support for incumbent President Emmanuel Macron.

In 2022, Bechu sponsored regulations to re-allow lark hunting in France. This is after previous regulations were struck down as being a violation of EU law.
