= Château de Brézé =

Castle in Pays de la Loire, France

Coordinates: 47°10′28″N 0°03′27″W

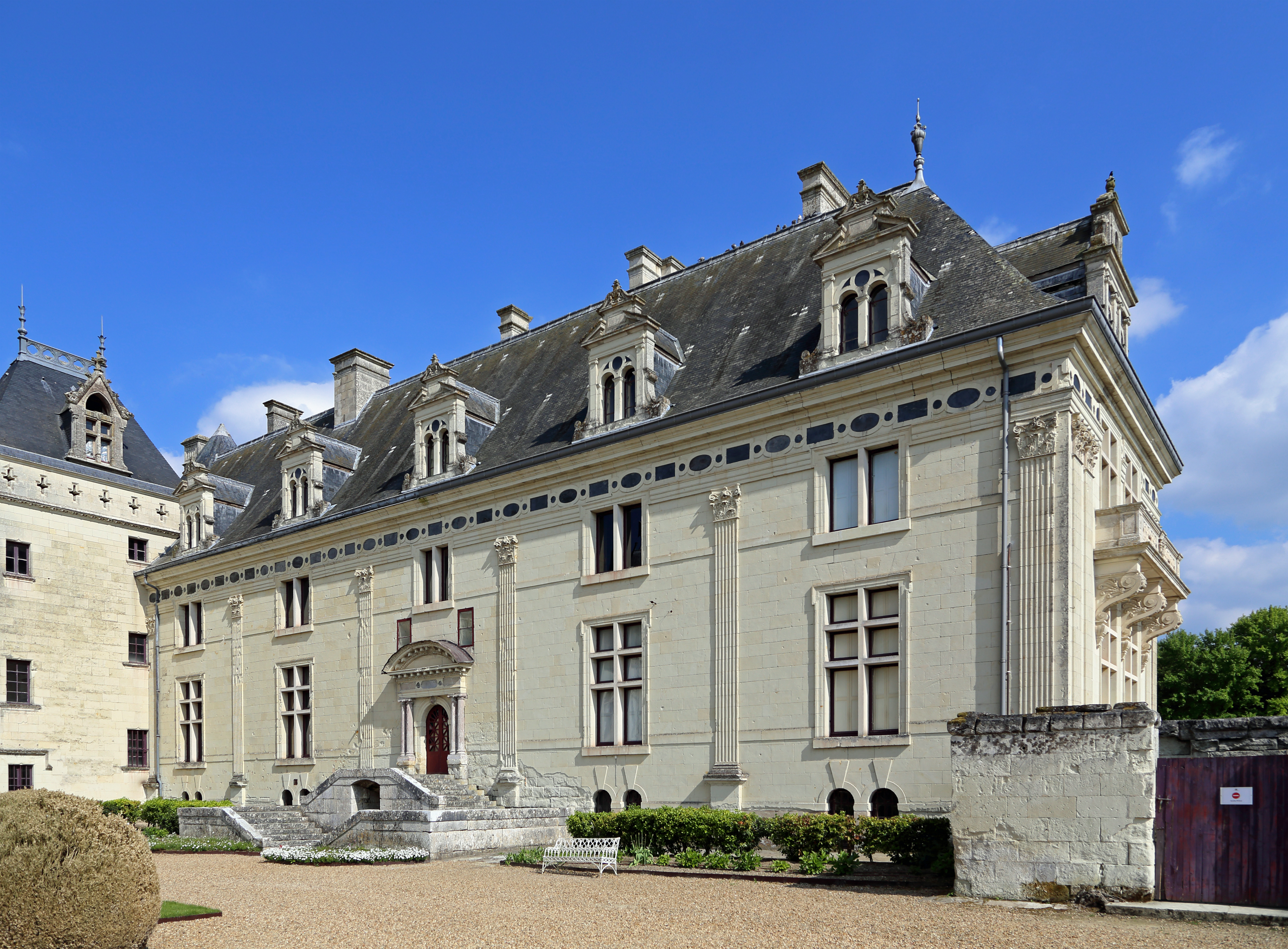
View of Château de Brézé

Château de Brézé is a small, dry-moated castle located in Brézé, near Saumur in the Loire Valley, France.

The château was transformed during the 16th and the 19th centuries. The current structure is Renaissance in style, yet retains medieval elements including a drawbridge and a 12th-century troglodytic basement.

Probably constructed as a refuge and shelter from Viking raids, the castle's cellars contain 3 km (2 mi) of galleries (1 km (0.6 mi) of which is currently accessible) that include living spaces, a bakery, storage areas and livestock areas.

The château is a listed ancient monument originally dating from 1060. Today, it is the residence of descendants of the ancient lords.

A range of wines is produced at the château which has 30 ha (70 acres) of vineyards.

== See also ==
- Brézé
- Château
- Saumur
- Anjou
- Loire Valley
- France
