= François Vatel =

French majordomo (died 1671)

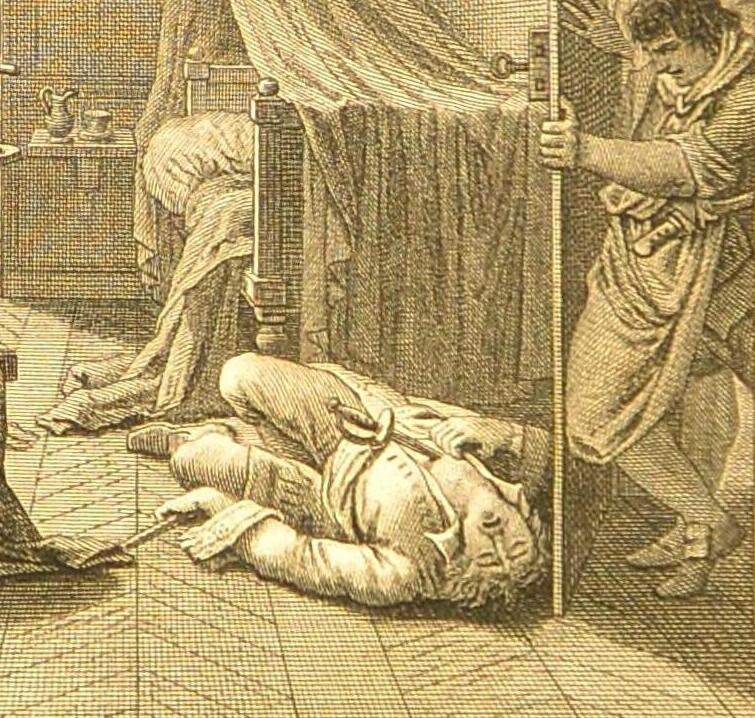
- Detail from an imaginative engraving of the suicide of Vatel – of whom there is no surviving visual evidence – by Silvestre David Mirys, 1805
- Born: 1625, 1631, or 1635; Switzerland or Paris, France
- Died: April 1671 (age 36–46); Chantilly, Oise, France
- Cause of death: Suicide
- Occupation: Administrator

François Vatel (French: [fʁɑ̃swa vatɛl]; 1631 – 24 April 1671) was the majordomo (in French, maître d'hôtel) of Nicolas Fouquet and prince Louis, Grand Condé.

== Biography ==
Vatel was born either in Switzerland or in Paris in 1631. He is widely, but incorrectly, credited with creating crème Chantilly (Chantilly cream), a sweet, vanilla-flavored whipped cream.

Vatel worked for Louis XIV's superintendent Nicolas Fouquet, and supervised the construction of the Vaux-le-Vicomte, a job that required financial management of large sums of money as well as the design of the menus and the supervision of staff. He was known for "the meticulous care with which he reviewed every minute detail".

Vatel was responsible for an extravagant banquet for 2,000 people on 24 April 1671 at the Château de Chantilly, on the occasion of Louis XIV's first visit to the Grand Condé. Vatel was so distraught about the lateness of the seafood delivery that he ran himself through with his sword (as the seafood was arriving), according to a letter by Madame de Sévigné.

This incident is thought to be the origin of the idiom "died for want of lobster sauce", a phrase meaning to die or be devastated due to "some trifling disappointment, pique, or wounded vanity".

== In popular culture ==
- Vatel was depicted in an eponymous 2000 film directed by Roland Joffé, in which he was portrayed by Gérard Depardieu.
- A portrait of Vatel and the story of his death are a plot point in the 2026 Anthony Bourdain biographical film Tony.
