= André Lardeux =

French politician (born 1946)

André Lardeux (born 22 August 1946) is a French politician and a former member of the Senate of France. He represented the Maine-et-Loire department and is a member of the Union for a Popular Movement Party.
