= Brézé =

- Part of Bellevigne-les-Châteaux
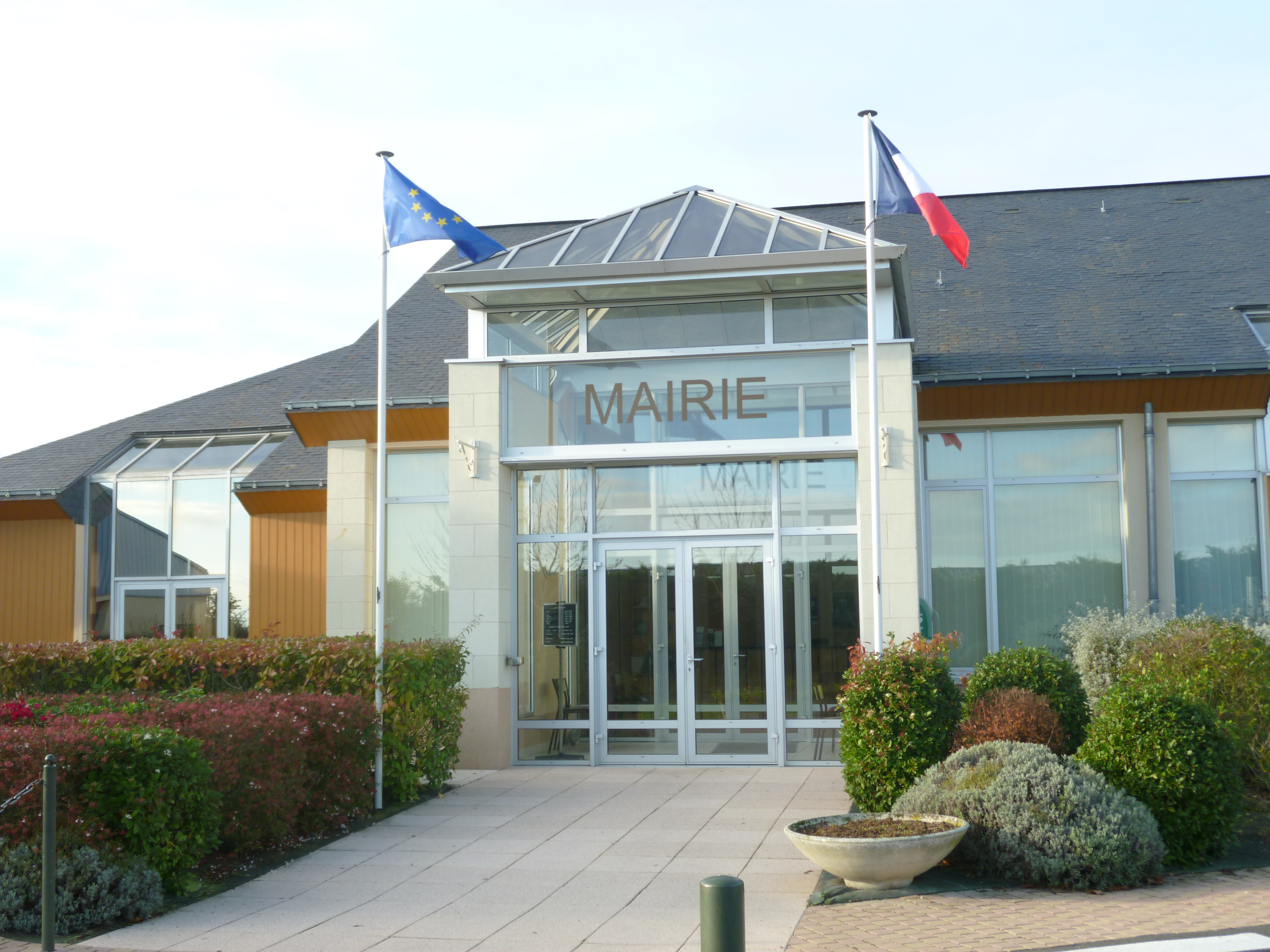
- The town hall in Brézé

- Coat of arms
- Location of Brézé
- Location within France Location within Pays de la Loire
- Coordinates: 47°10′19″N 0°03′25″W
- Country: France
- Region: Pays de la Loire
- Department: Maine-et-Loire
- Arrondissement: Saumur
- Canton: Doué-la-Fontaine
- Commune: Bellevigne-les-Châteaux
- Area^{1}: 20.05 km^{2} (7.74 sq mi)
- Elevation: 46 m (151 ft)
- Highest elevation: 104 m (341 ft)
- Lowest elevation: 26 m (85 ft)
- Population (2022): 1,177
  - Density: 58.70/km^{2} (152.0/sq mi)
- Time zone: UTC+01:00 (CET)
  - Summer (DST): UTC+02:00 (CEST)
- Postal code: 49260
- ^{1} French Land Register data, which excludes lakes, ponds, glaciers > 1 km^{2} (0.386 sq mi or 247 acres) and river estuaries.

Brézé (French pronunciation: [bʁeze]) is a former commune in the Maine-et-Loire department in western France. On 1 January 2019, it was merged into the new commune Bellevigne-les-Châteaux. The Château de Brézé is a small, dry-moated castle.

== Population ==
Historical population

Year	Pop.	±% p.a.
1793	880	—
1800	978	+1.52%
1806	1,021	+0.72%
1821	1,003	−0.12%
1831	983	−0.20%
1836	964	−0.39%
1841	999	+0.72%
1846	932	−1.38%
1851	936	+0.09%
1856	911	−0.54%
1861	911	+0.00%
1866	869	−0.94%
1872	854	−0.29%
1876	871	+0.49%
1881	878	+0.16%
1886	877	−0.02%
1891	895	+0.41%
1896	865	−0.68%

Year	Pop.	±% p.a.
1901	863	−0.05%
1906	883	+0.46%
1911	862	−0.48%
1921	722	−1.76%
1926	714	−0.22%
1931	695	−0.54%
1936	680	−0.44%
1946	682	+0.03%
1954	748	+1.16%
1962	848	+1.58%
1968	841	−0.14%
1975	877	+0.60%
1982	1,207	+4.67%
1990	1,379	+1.68%
1999	1,299	−0.66%
2013	1,289	−0.06%
2022	1,177	−1.00%

Source: EHESS and INSEE

== Personalities ==
- Claire-Clémence de Maillé-Brézé, born here in 1628, Princess of Condé

== See also ==
- Communes of the Maine-et-Loire department
