= Château de Magny-en-Bessin =

Building in Calvados, France

Coordinates: 49°18′27″N 0°39′54″W

- Château de Magny-en-Bessin
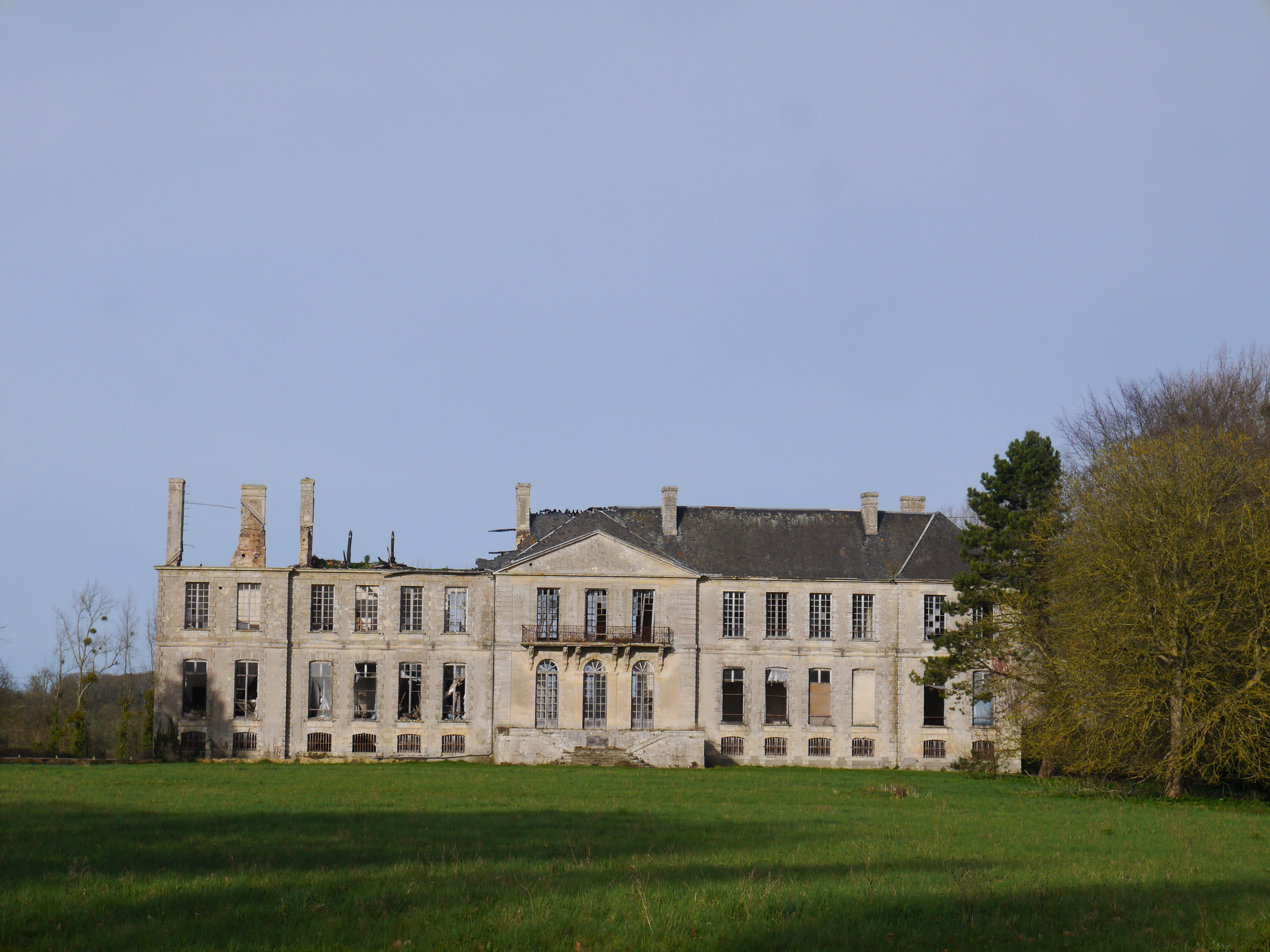
- The château in 2017
- Interactive map of Château de Magny-en-Bessin

General information
- Location: France, Normandy, Calvados, Magny-en-Bessin
- Year built: 1728

The Château de Magny-en-Bessin (Castle of Magny-en-Bessin) is a classical-style French château located in the commune of Magny-en-Bessin, in the Calvados department.

The estate belonged at the end of the 17th century to a prominent figure, Nicolas-Joseph Foucault, and gradually expanded to cover three-quarters of the current commune by the end of the century.

The château was built in the 18th century on older foundations that cannot be precisely dated due to the current state of knowledge, and no visible elevations of the original structure remain.

The château changed owners at the beginning of the 19th century but experienced a period of stability and local prominence. A new sale brought particularly brutal mutilations immediately after the end of World War II. It was listed as a historic monument by decree on 31 May 1946.

Transformed into a textile factory for a quarter of a century and then abandoned starting in the 1970s, it was partially destroyed by two successive fires in March 2016. The château was selected by Stéphane Bern, head of the Mission for the Identification and Preservation of Endangered Heritage (Mission d'identification et de sauvegarde du patrimoine en péril), to receive emergency financial aid from the heritage lottery twice, during the draws on 15 and 16 September 2018, on the occasion of European Heritage Days, and again in 2021. At the end of the first quarter of the 21st century, the preservation of the building is uncertain, but the establishment of an active association offers hope that restoration work will take place.

== Location ==
The château is located in the village of Magny-en-Bessin, in the Calvados department. It is situated 4 kilometers as the crow flies from Arromanches and the coast of the English Channel.

== History ==
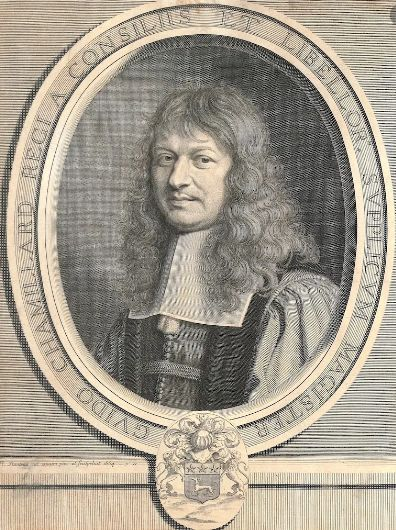
Guy Chamillard, engraved by Robert Nanteuil in 1664.

=== Site ===
In the 19th century, the site of the château yielded polished stone axes dated to 4000 BC, which are preserved at the Baron-Gérard Museum in Bayeux. Opposite the château, Roman-era artifacts were found by Arcisse de Caumont, as well as remnants of buildings with painted frescos. However, the site has not been scientifically excavated.

A Merovingian necropolis was also excavated nearby in the 19th century. Its artifacts have been dated to the late 4th century or early 5th century.

=== Estate ===
==== 12th century to the Foucault family ====
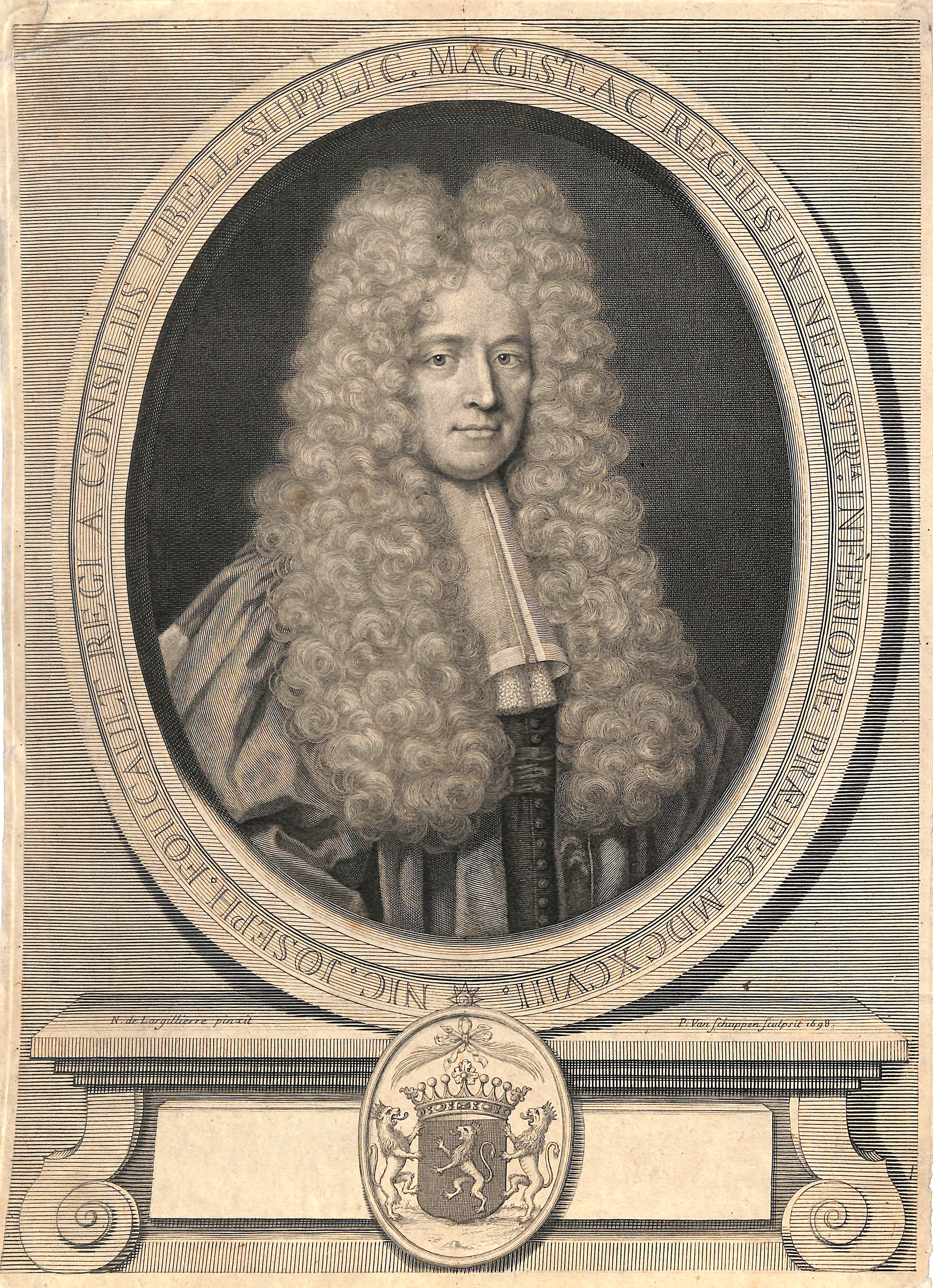
Nicolas-Joseph Foucault (1698), by Pieter van Schuppen, engraving after Nicolas de Largillierre.

A château may have existed as early as 1191. By the end of the 14th century, the fief belonged to the de Mailloc family and passed to the de Mannoury family at the end of the next century, possibly through marriage. The Saint-Malo church holds a tombstone that may belong to Guillaume de Mannoury, who died in 1501.

The fief passed to the Saint-Ouen family in 1515 and remained their possession until the late 17th century. The Saint-Ouen family sold the fief by auction in 1673; the buyer was Guy Chamillart, the intendant of the Caen generality. His son, Michel Chamillart, became a counselor in the Parliament of Paris in 1676, then the Controller-General of Finances in 1699, and Secretary of state for War in 1701. Michel Chamillart expanded the Magny estate through purchases in Ryes and exchanges with the King in Arromanches and Tracy. On 8 October 1694, by letters patent signed at Fontainebleau, Michel Chamillart obtained the right of high justice for the Magny fief, extending over the parishes of Magny, Ryes, Manvieux, Tracy, and Arromanches.

The fief was then acquired by Nicolas-Joseph Foucault, the intendant of the Caen generality (1689–1706), on 25 December 1694. The fief became a marquisate in February 1695. Nicolas-Joseph Foucault rarely visited Magny; the estate served as a repository for the results of excavations carried out in Vieux and Coutances.

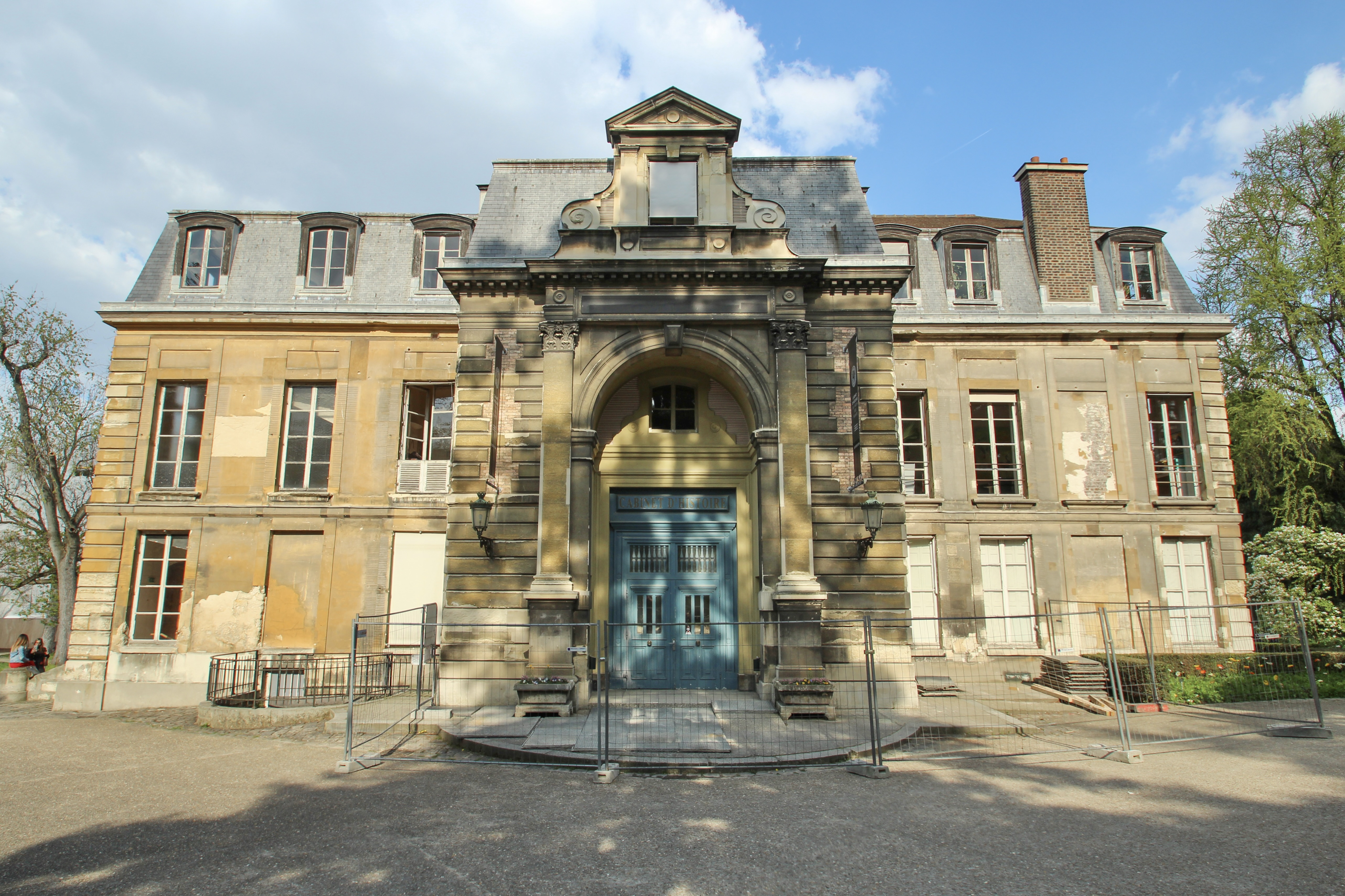
The Hôtel de Magny, owned by Nicolas-Joseph Foucault from 1758.

The intendant Foucault's son, Nicolas-Joseph Foucault II, owned the château from 1704 and lived there until his death in 1772. He expanded the estate by acquiring Bazenville and Damigny in 1714. In a legal battle against her husband over financial issues, the marquise obtained full ownership of the Magny land in 1719, although she never visited it.

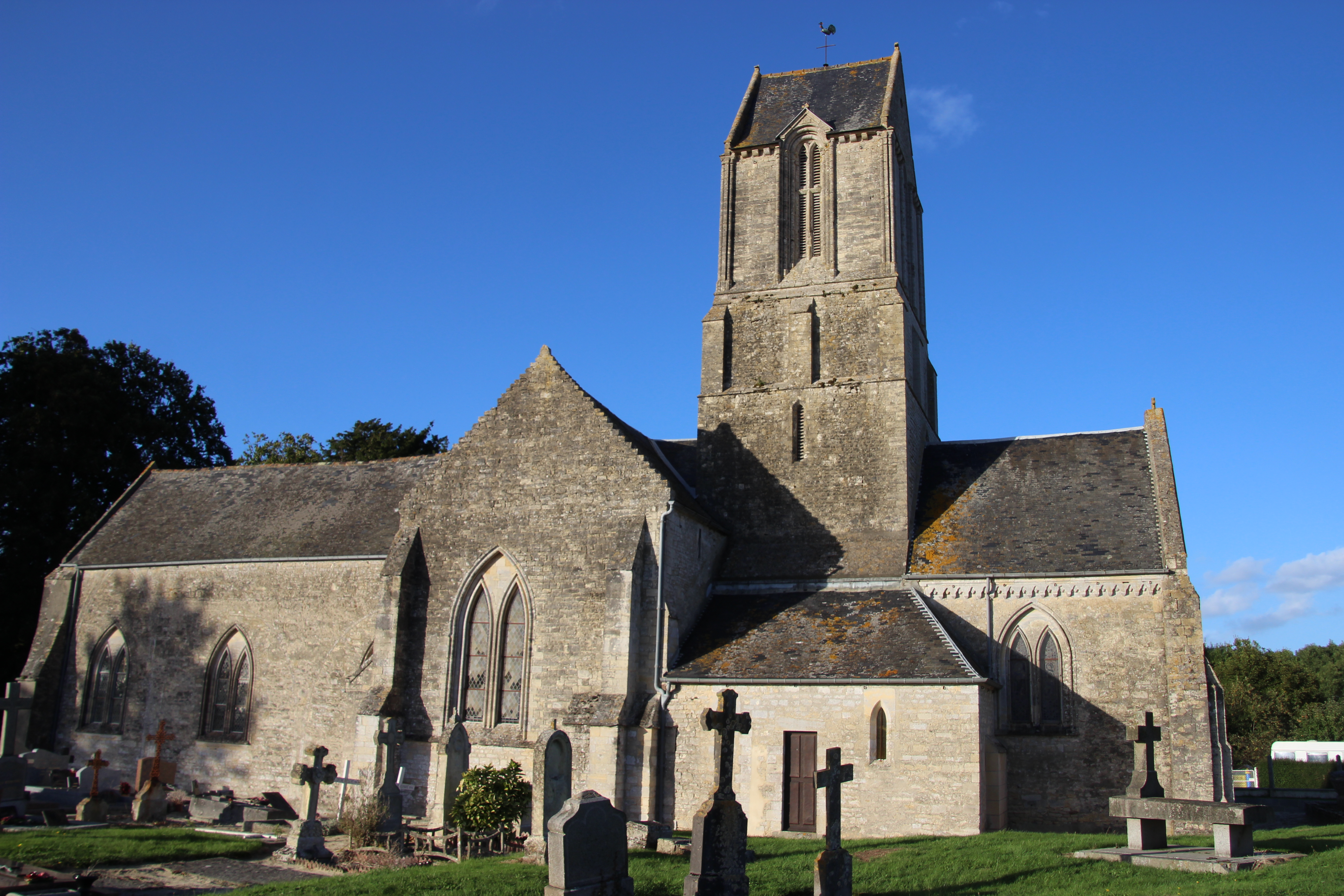
The tombstone of Nicolas Joseph Foucault can be seen in Saint-Malo church.

The Marquis regained Magny by decree of the Parliament of Paris in 1728. He resided at the château from 1736. He created an avenue of trees from the château to the cathedral, depicted in 1736. From 1731, the marquis was one of the "lieutenants of the king’s great venery," spending winters in Paris, particularly at the Hôtel de Magny acquired in 1758. The Magny estate was then about 336 hectares, equivalent to "three-quarters of the current commune". Widowed in 1755, the marquis lost his three children and had no descendants. Living as a "Christian philosopher," he died at his château at the age of 95 on 20 June 1772. His tombstone, defaced during the Revolution in 1794, is still present in the Magny church.

==== From the Foucaults until 1945 ====
The estate passed to cousins who were unable to keep it and sold it on 31 December 1772. On 17 January 1773, the château was sold to the lord of Courseulles, Marquis Pierre Charles de La Rivière, born in 1749 in Rouen and a soldier, who probably commissioned a new interior decoration. He rarely lived at Magny. He died of smallpox on 26 December 1778, aged just 29, without issue.

The estate passed into the hands of René Louis Gilles Hervé Clément Dubois de Littry on 22 January 1780, and he had only one child, a daughter, who died in childbirth in 1787. Mayor of Bayeux in 1790, he did not emigrate, but did not live in the château. The High Court was closed in November 1790, and the archives were burned on 24 Brumaire an II. On 20 Messidor an II, the marquis's tombstone was damaged in the church, and the château's coat-of-arms decoration was removed. The château was frequently requisitioned during the wars of the Revolution and the First Empire, between 1792 and 1815.

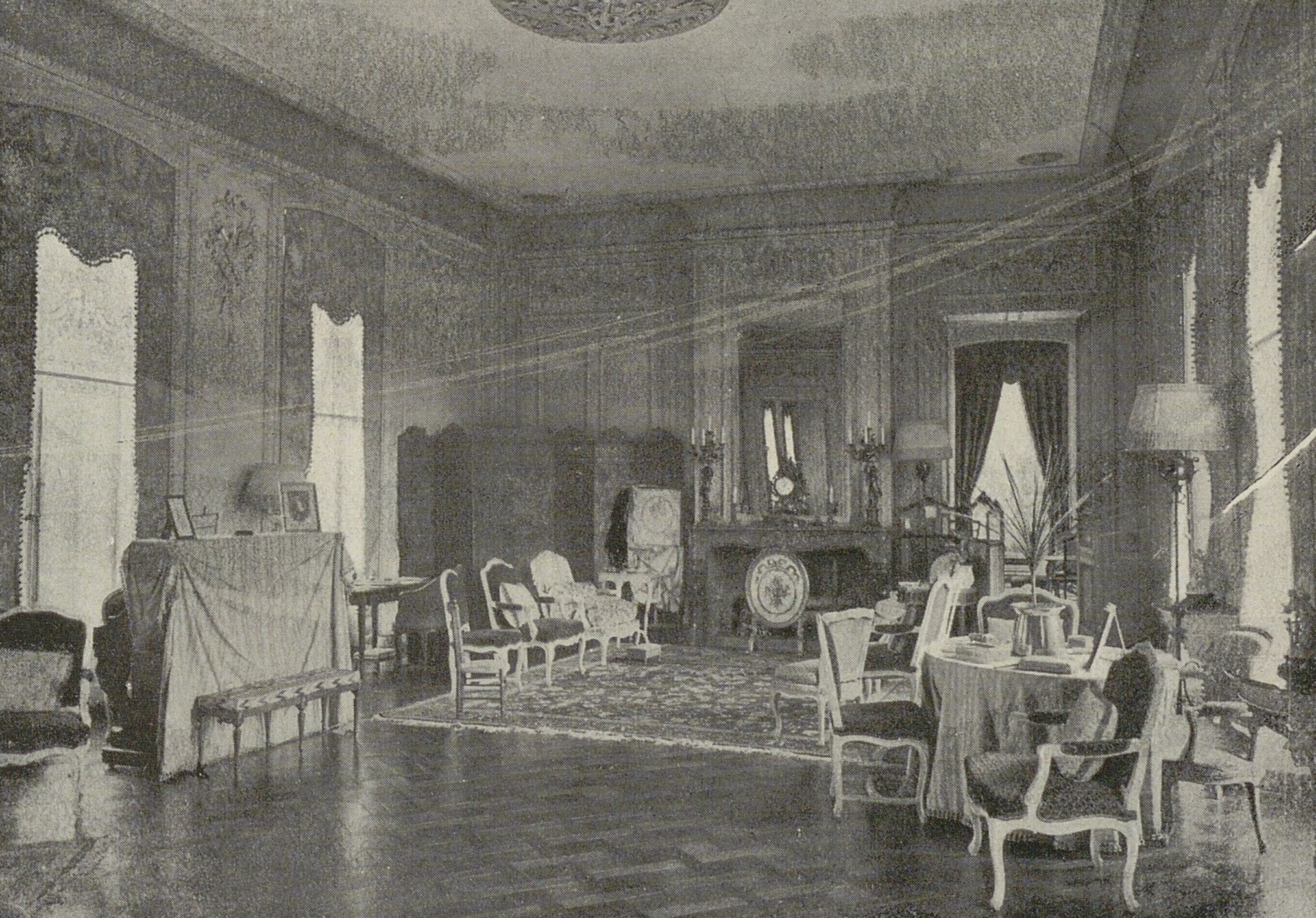
The Grand Salon in 1914.

Dubois de Littry's grandson, Claude Clément Auguste de La Tour du Pin, became mayor of Bayeux but died in 1812. His sister married Eugène-François-Charles Achard de Bonvouloir, and the estate remained in this family until 1945. Most of Magny's owners were mayors of the commune. The estate "lived a brilliant life" in the 19th century, with a hare-hunting pack until around 1900 and numerous receptions. The staff was numerous.

Around 1840, Count Charles de Bonvouloir had the landscaped grounds and surroundings redesigned. To the south of the château, the forecourt, moat, and main courtyard disappeared, as did the French garden to the north. A 10-hectare star-shaped park was created, but it did not follow the principles of English gardens. Around 1900, work was carried out on the floors and roof.

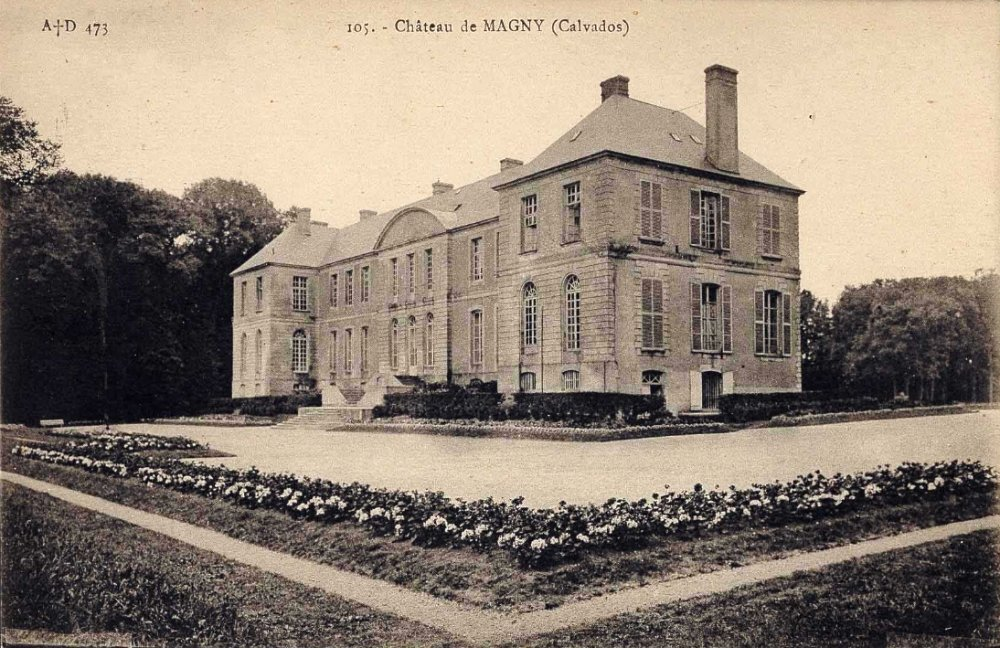
North facade at the beginning of the 20th century.

Guillaume de Bonvouloir, the father of three daughters, was widowed in 1935 and died on 14 May 1937. The château was stripped of its furnishings at a sale in July. During the Second World War, the château was requisitioned by the occupying forces on 10 July 1940. A Kommandantur was set up: the building was used to house troops and to requisition materials for the blockhouses on the coast 4 km away. The Kriegsmarine moved in nearby in January 1942, and the building was not damaged during this period. Wehrmacht soldiers were stationed in the château, and Osttruppen were stationed in the outbuildings. Graffiti from the period are preserved, including two swastikas and a caricature of Adolf Hitler. Magny was liberated on the evening of 6 June 1944, by the 2nd Battalion of the Gloucestershire Regiment, the German troops having previously evacuated the building "as a matter of urgency". During the Battle of Normandy, the château was used as a depot. An airfield was set up to the south of the château until September 1944, and "nobody [...] stayed at the château ".

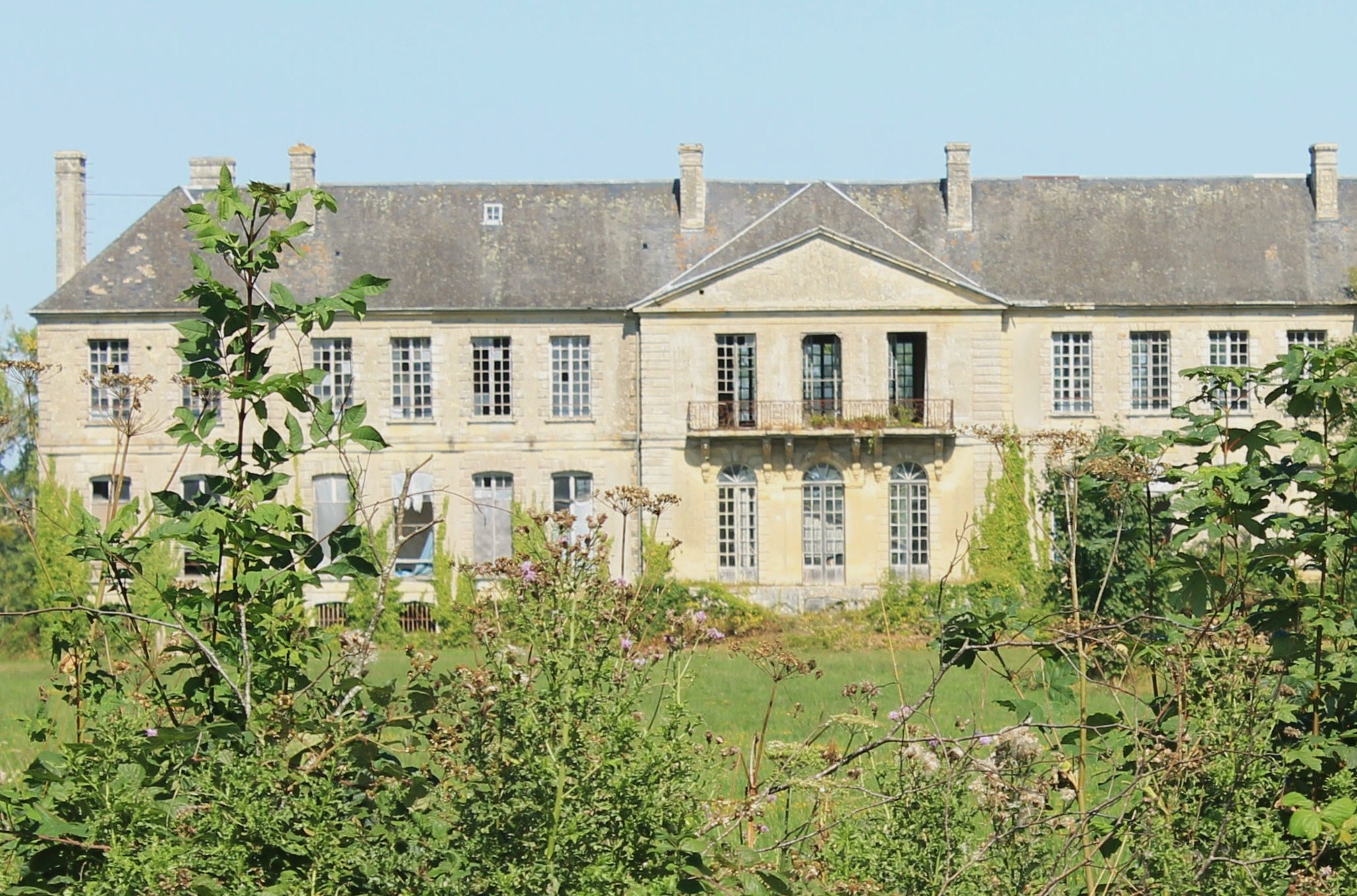
The château in 2013, before the fire of 2016.

=== 1945 to the 21st century ===
==== 1945–2016 ====
The Magny estate was sold by the daughters of Guillaume de Bonvouloir in 1945 to Guy Bertrand Marie Joseph Kermerec'hou de Kerautem, an antique dealer who had numerous items removed within a few months, "everything that could be torn out and sold was torn out and sold": woodwork, panelling, fireplaces, etc. and even "the most beautiful trees in the park" were cut down.

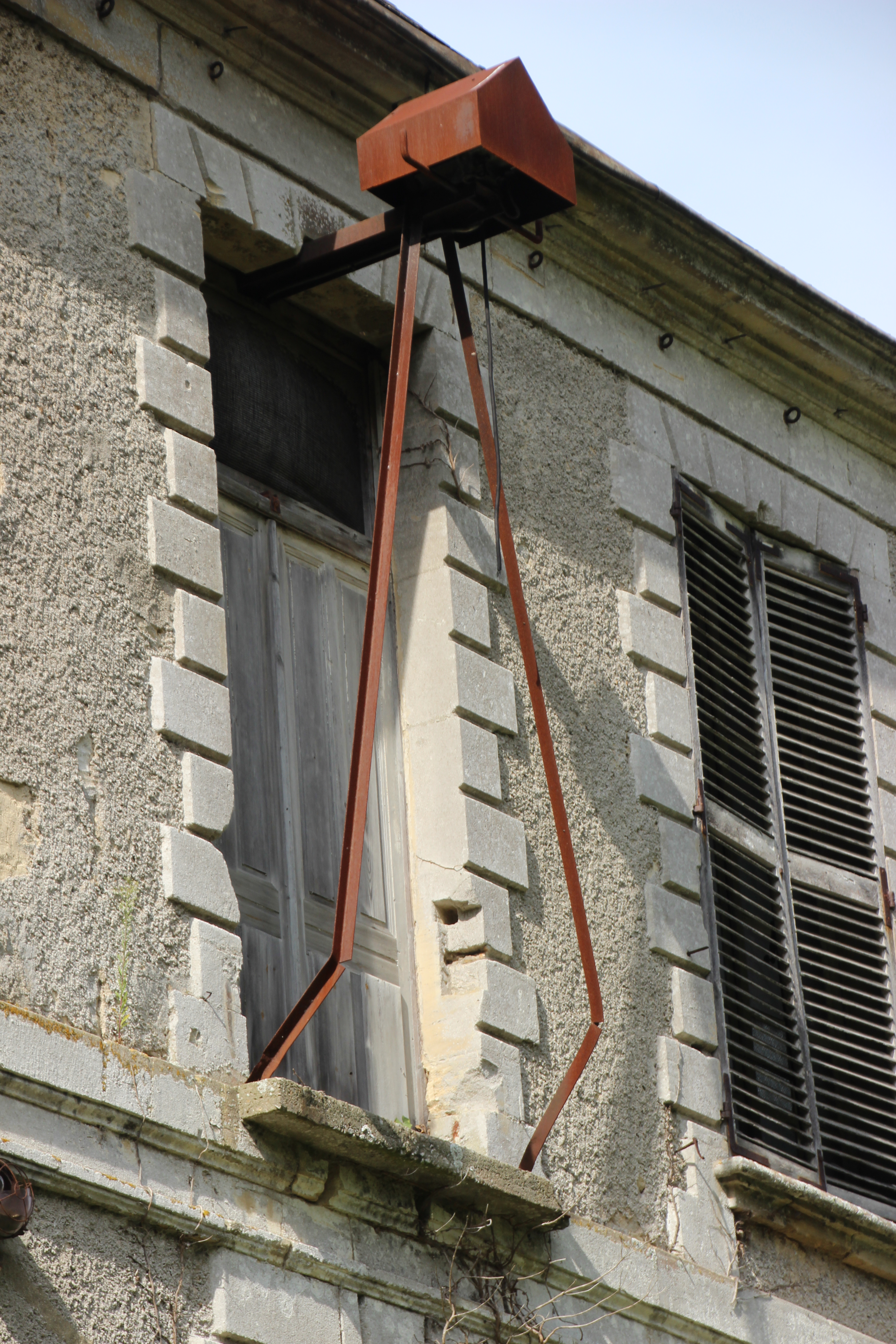
Lifting equipment to be retained in 2020.

Following a report, a classification procedure was initiated on 16 November 1945, resulting in the chateau and grounds being listed on the supplementary inventory of historic monuments by decree on 31 May 1946. Despite this protection, "looting continued ".

On 26 August 1949, a Belgian industrialist, Josef van Pamel, bought the estate and founded the Société linière de Magny. The château was transformed into a spinning mill, or more precisely a scutching plant (separating flax and hemp fibers). The ground-floor walls were demolished, and a 50 m-long concrete platform was erected to accommodate the heavy machinery. The chapel, which had become an obstacle to access to the lower part of the building, was demolished. Technical facilities were installed in the park, including hangars.

In 1973, José van Pamel, son of the factory's founder, took over the business, which was soon to cease. A stud farm was founded but ceased operations. José van Pamel became mayor in 1983.

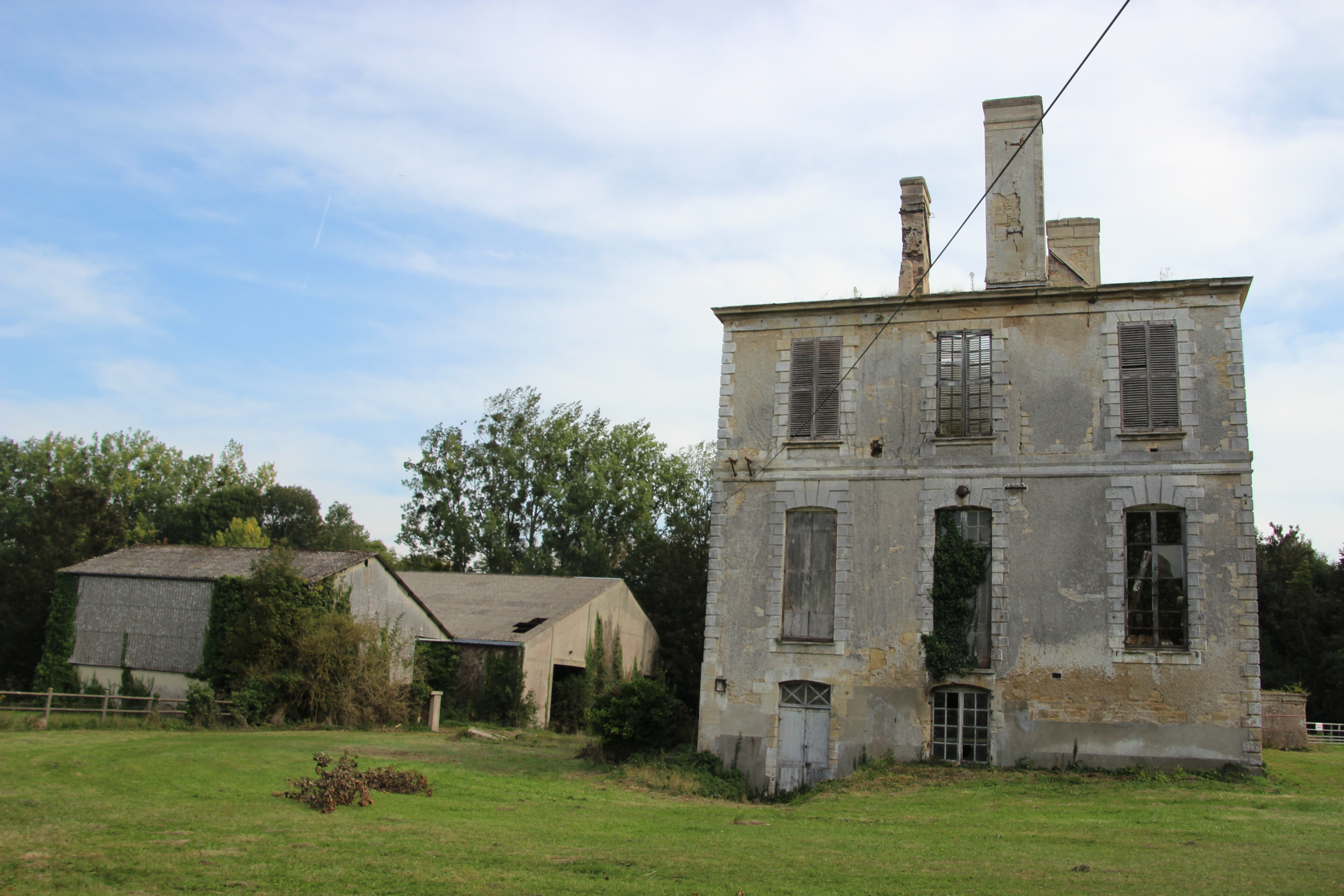
View of the château and two sheds dating from the factory era.

After the end of the business, José van Pamel sold his property. The château was sold in 1989 and the outbuildings on 16 March 2003. It was acquired by a Dutch painter and artist, Krijn Giezen, and his wife Martina, a publisher. They moved into the château, then into the outbuildings. He is the founder of Land art in his country, and of ecological art in 1950. The couple seems intent on bringing the estate back to life by opening a museum dedicated to contemporary art. The estate is used for exhibitions and as a workshop.

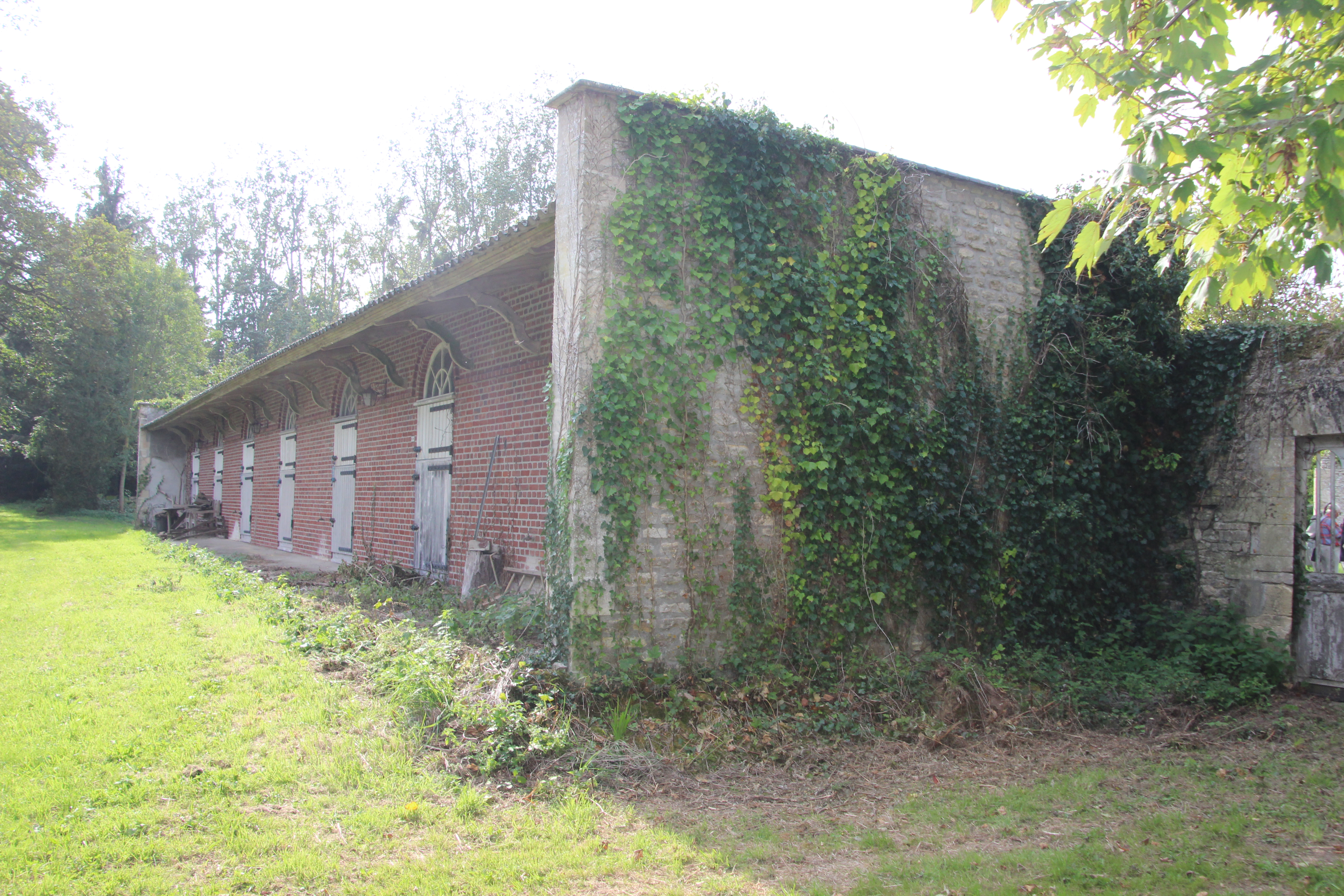
Magny stud stables.

In 1989, the trees on the allée des évêques leading to Bayeux Cathedral were felled, "a gesture seen as a tragedy by many villagers" (Ouest-France, 18 March 2016). The owner's relations with the local authorities became strained. The château was abandoned for several decades. An article in La Manche Libre in June 2012 refers to "le château assassiné ".

Giezen died on 30 January 2011. Since then, Martina has occupied an outbuilding. Plans to sell the château have come to nothing. The floors of the west pavilion collapsed before 2011.

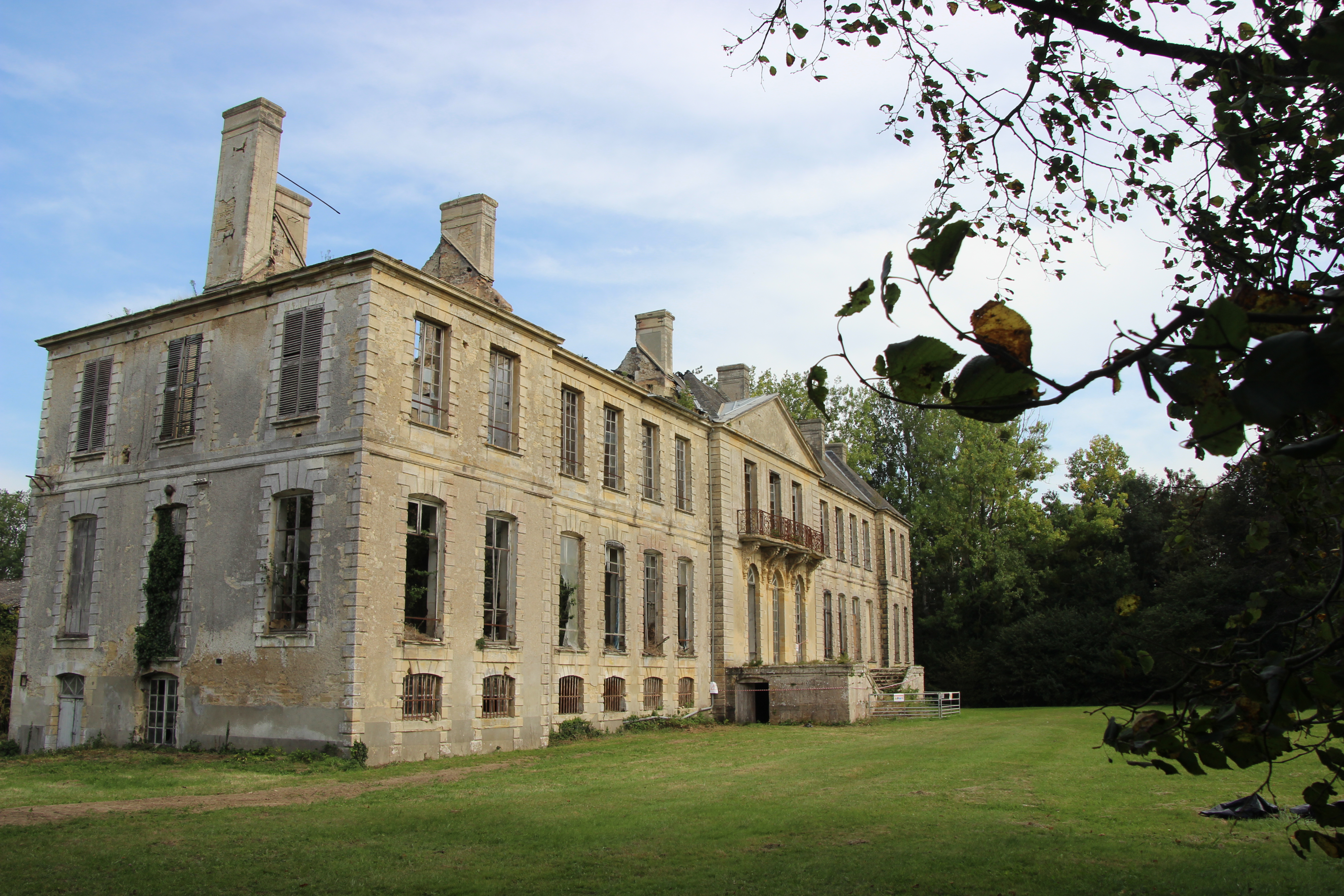
The southern facade of the château in September 2020.

==== Since 2016 ====
On the night of 16–17 March 2016, around midnight, a fire broke out in the north wing, destroying the roof structure and floors. The fire broke out in the south wing of the building, on the 1st floor or in the attic, possibly as a result of electrical shorts. The fire started "on the first floor of the west pavilion". The frame and floors went up in smoke, despite the intervention of some fifty firefighters and twenty vehicles. The firefighters' work was made difficult by the general state of the buildings, particularly the floors, which had collapsed in places.

Despite efforts to extinguish the beams in particular, a new fire ravaged the building on Saturday, 26 March 2016, at around 5 pm. Two beams on the second floor caught fire again.

At the end of the disasters, one wing was ravaged, and half the roofs and floors were destroyed. The slab, however, held under the rubble, sparing the basement.

The château was entered as a candidate for the Bern mission of the Heritage Lotto and selected in May 2018 from 269 buildings out of 2,000 applications nationwide. The building's participation is seen as "a spotlight on the château ".

A preservation association, whose articles of association were filed on 17 September 2018, was created and chaired by Hervé Baptiste, a former chief architect of historic monuments who had been contacted by the owner. The mayor of the commune is an ex-officio member. The association provides guided tours of the estate during the 2020 European Heritage Days. The association has around 200 members in 2021. 180 visitors come to the site on European Heritage Days 2022.

At the end of 2020, a first project costing €60,000 took place, subsidized by the Heritage Lottery, the DRAC, and the Departmental Council of Calvados. On 30 August 2021, the château was again selected by the Bern mission, which awarded it a grant of €300,000. Work on the "hors d'eau et hors d'air" project begins with a building permit granted on 7 October 2022.

== Building and park ==
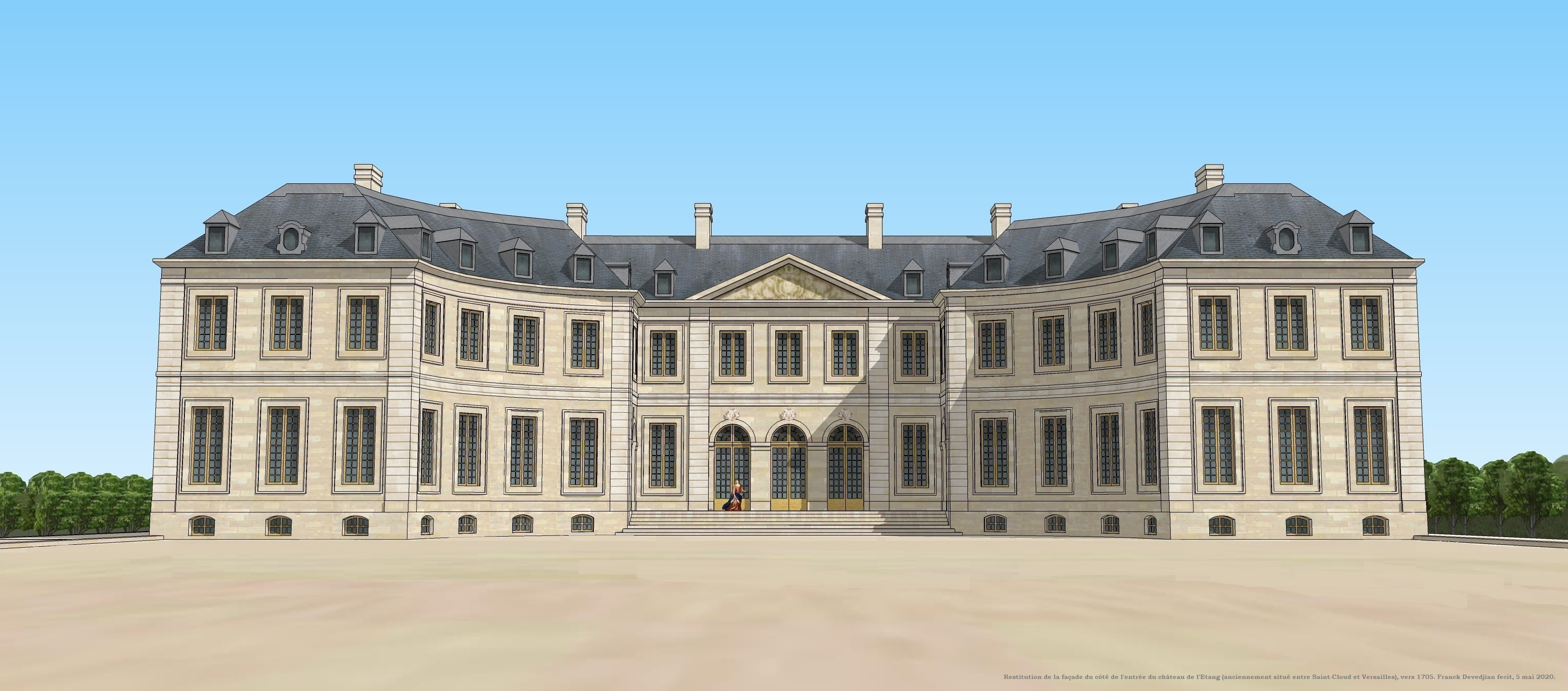
Restitution of the entrance-side façade of Château de l'Étang, circa 1705. This building may well have influenced the creator of Magny-en-Bessin.

=== Dating the complex ===
Château de Magny once had "important buildings", as evidenced by traces of reused walls in the current construction. Other clues found during recent work include elements of an old chimney, the flashing of the "ridge of a building that once leaned against it", a "blocked medieval bay" and other medieval elements. "There was an important castle before the present".

Map of the estate: A: dwelling B: clock pavilion C: greenhouse D: coach house E: stables F: chapel no longer standing G: shed H: factory sheds 1: chartreuse garden 2: orchard 3: formal garden

The frame of the clock building bears the following inscription: "JULES GUESNET AGE DE 18 ANS ET MON PERE AGE DE 45 ANS A FAIT CE (?) BATIS EN L'AN 1715 [JULES GUESNET AGED 18 ANS AND MY FATHER AGED 45 MADE THIS (?) BUILT IN 1715]". Jacques Moussard, a Bayeux native, was considered the architect. This attribution is "certainly unfounded" for Hervé Baptiste. The château was influenced by the work of Jules Hardouin-Mansard at Château de l'Étang, perhaps through the intermediary of Michel Chamillart "former owner of Magny and friend of the Foucault fathers and sons".

For a long time, the present château was erroneously considered to have been built between 1689 and 1715. According to Hervé Baptiste, who questions this dating, the present château was built around 1728, and no texts have been preserved that mention the work. Some of the walls of the old building have been preserved, as the client wished to correct the axis to make it coincide more closely with that of Bayeux Cathedral. The two pavilions were built with symmetry in mind.

A dovecote was built during the eighteenth century. In the eighteenth century, 80% of the land in the parish belonged to the lord of Magny. A driveway some 2 km long faced the château, "centred on the crossing tower of Bayeux Cathedral".

The framework was completed around 1730, and "everything was more or less finished by 1736 ".

The Napoleonic cadastre shows the estate in 1809: the outbuildings appear to be the original ones, preserved. New stables were built in 1960.

=== Materials and decoration ===
The château is built of ashlar, limestone, rubble stone, rendering and rustication.

Some surviving decorative elements are in the Rocaille style. Most of the architectural elements have been damaged by predators. The ironwork of a grand staircase in the wing that fell victim to the fires remains.

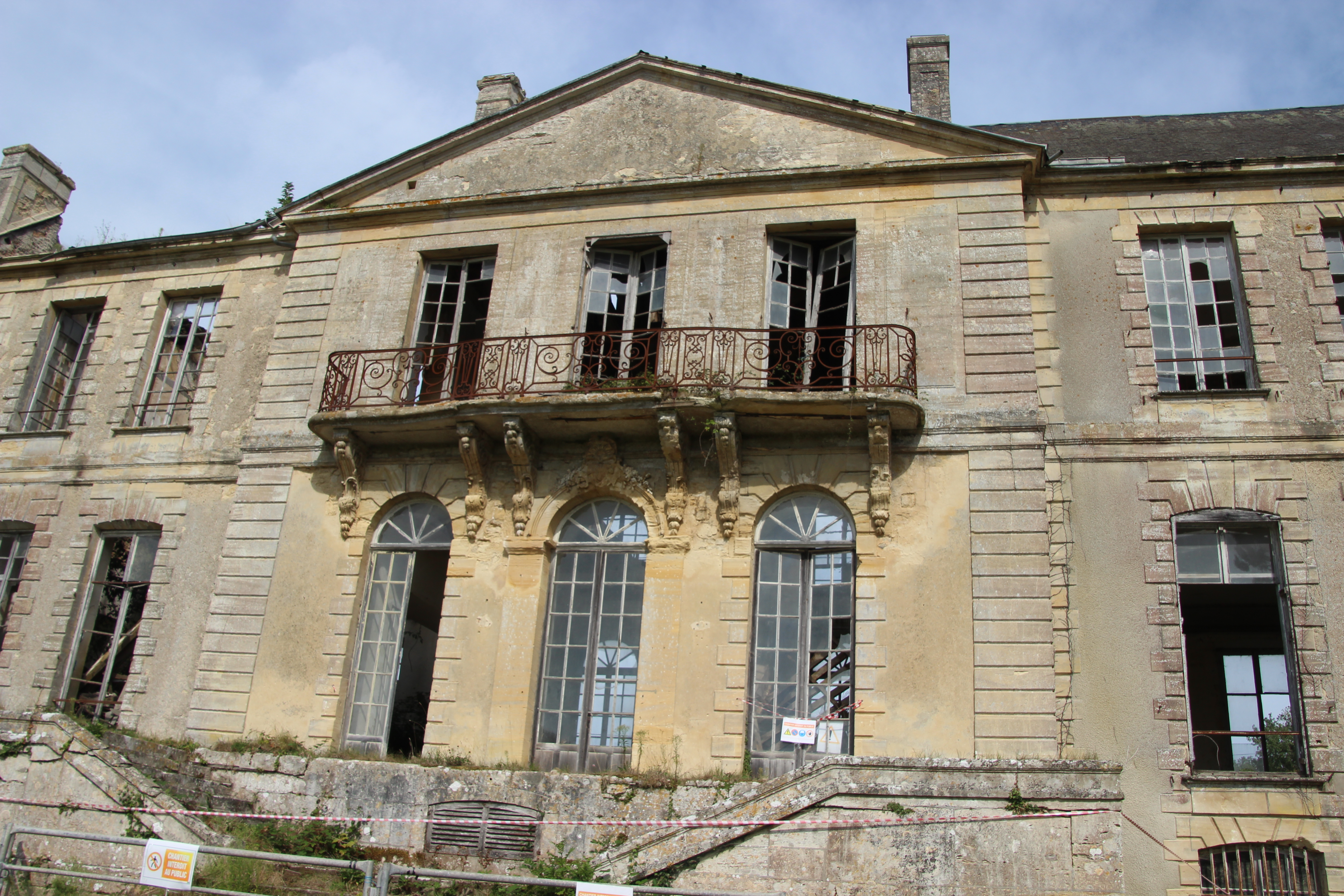
Pediment and front of southern façade.

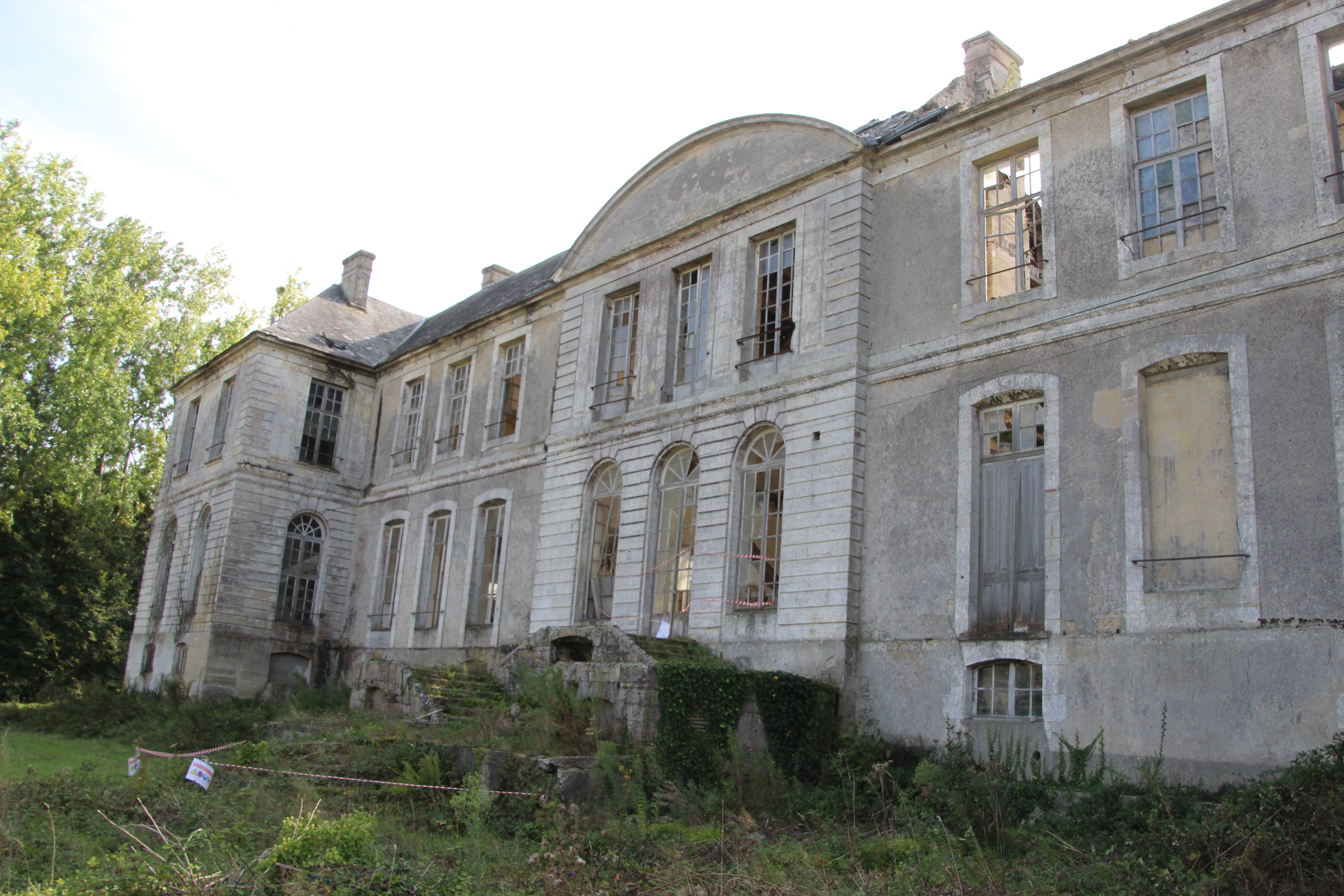
Northern façade.

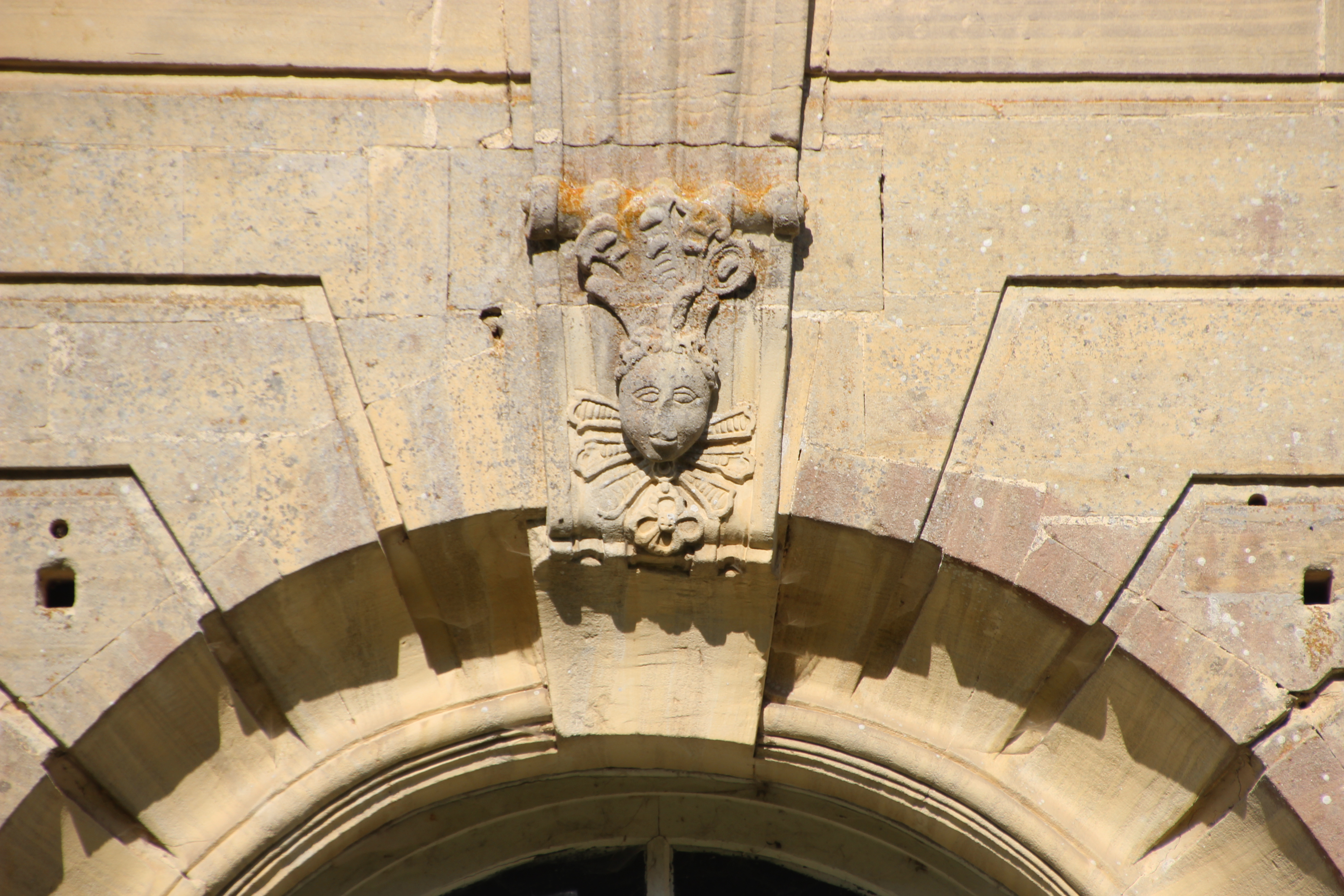
Detail of the front of the large stables.

=== Park ===
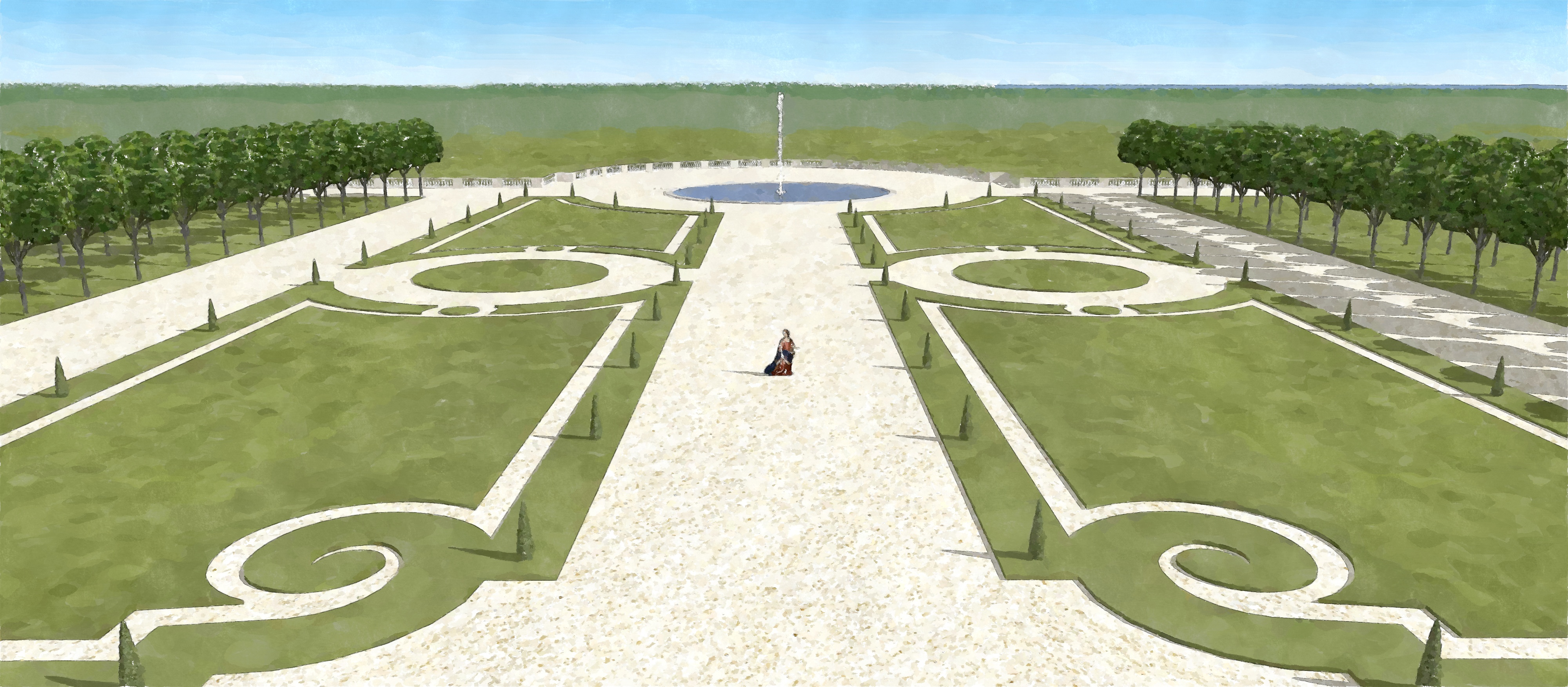
Proposed reconstruction of the 18th-century parterre at Château de Magny-en-Bessin.

In the 18th and 19th centuries, the château's avenues laid out three-quarters of the commune. Arcisse de Caumont described the château as "considerable" in 1857.

In front of the château, facing the "Grande Avenue", were a forecourt and a courtyard of honour. There were also water features and a formal garden to the north of the building.

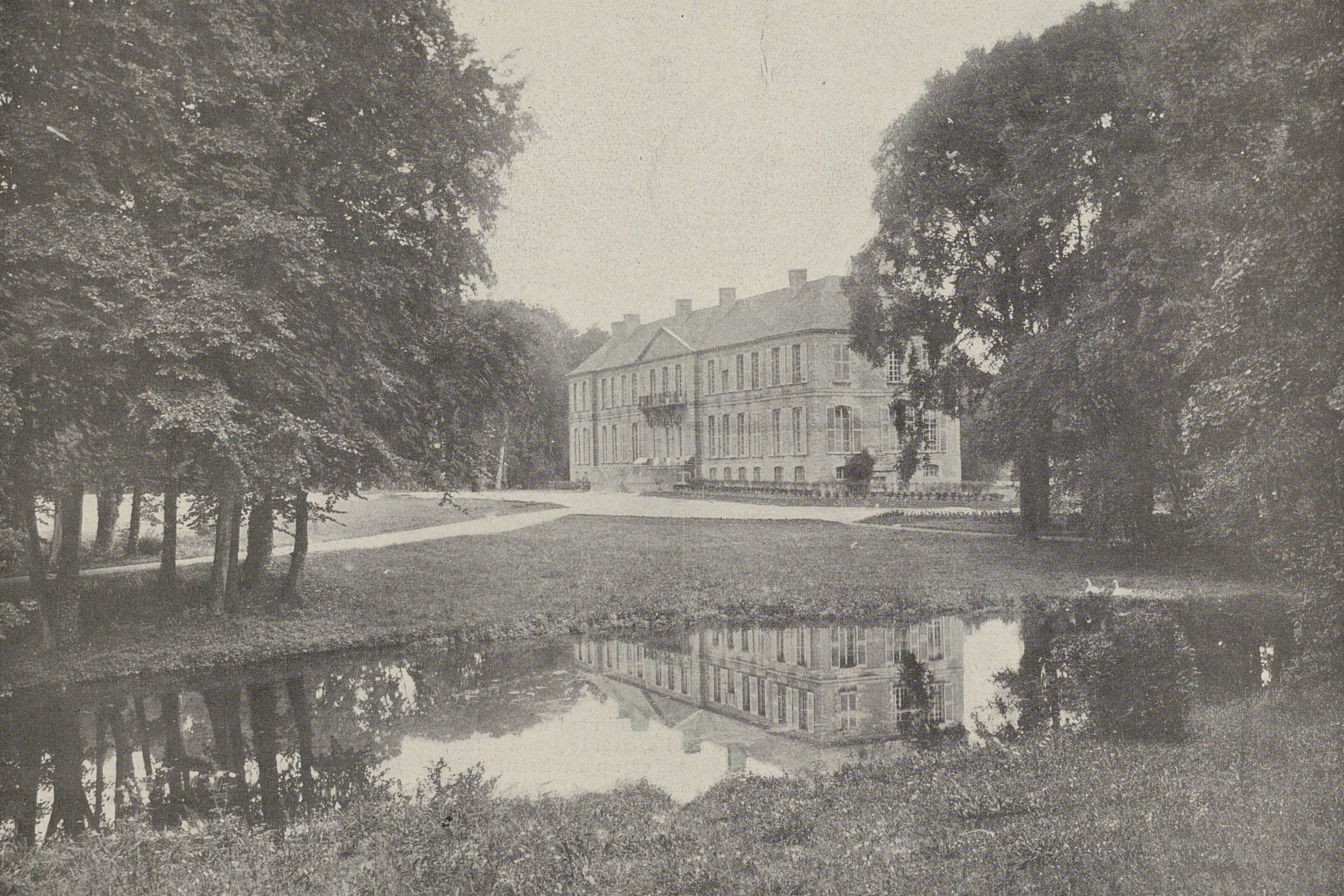
The château reflected in a pond.

An orchard and a kitchen garden "en chartreuse" were created at an unknown date. A greenhouse, "undoubtedly" by Guillot Pelletier, was installed at the very end of the 19th century, as was a short-lived tennis court.

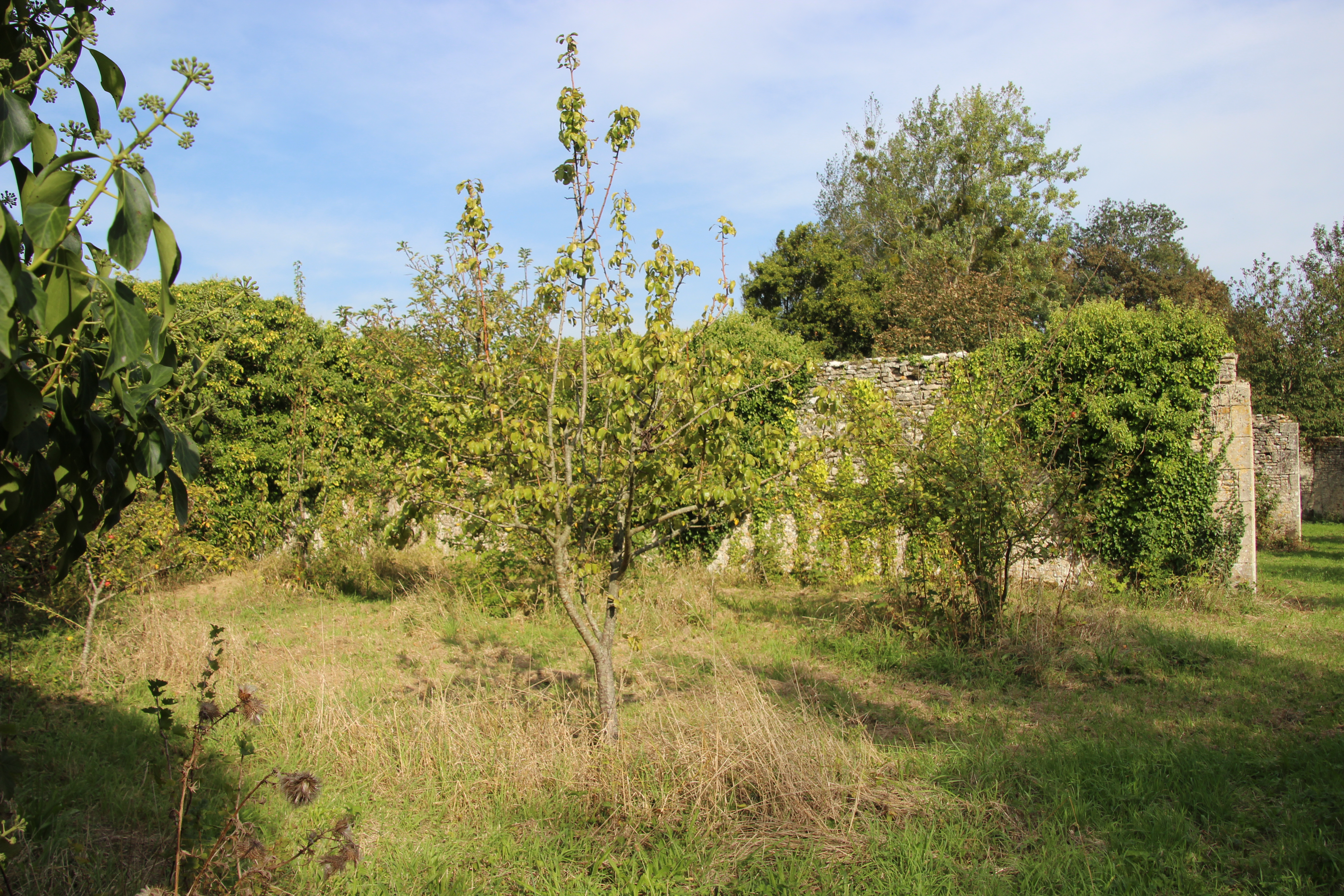
View of part of the chartreuse orchard and vegetable garden.

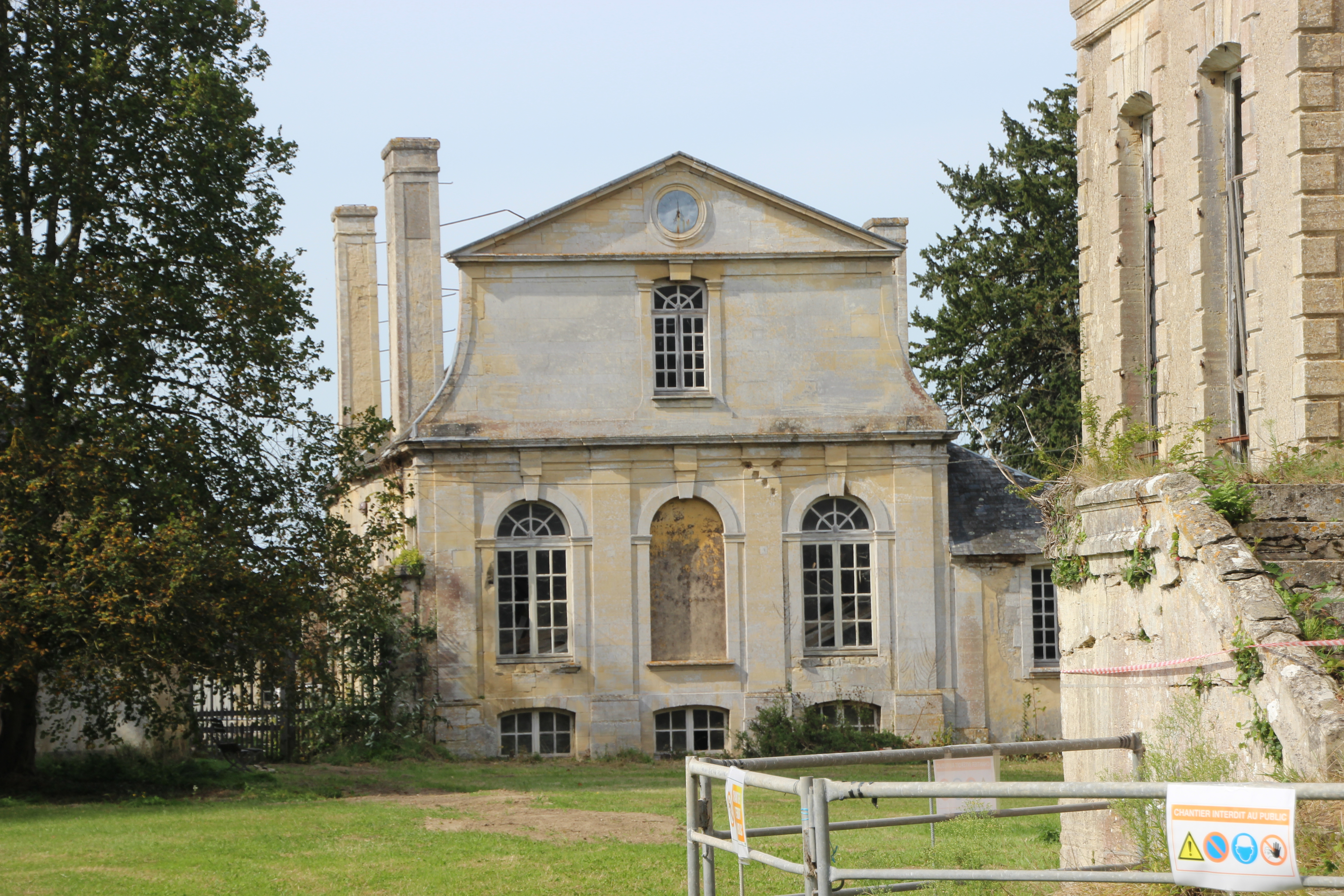
Clock pavilion.

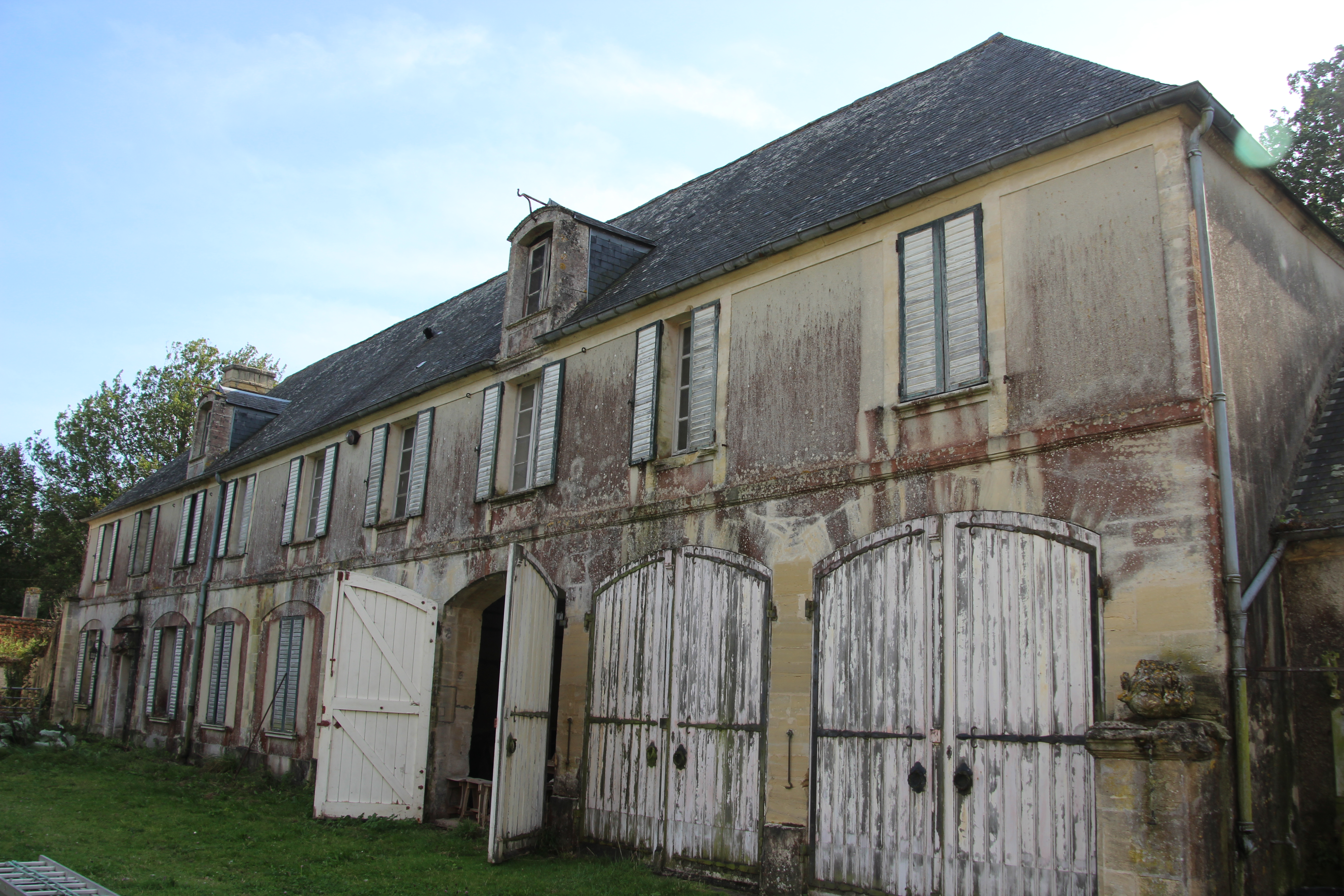
Large shed.

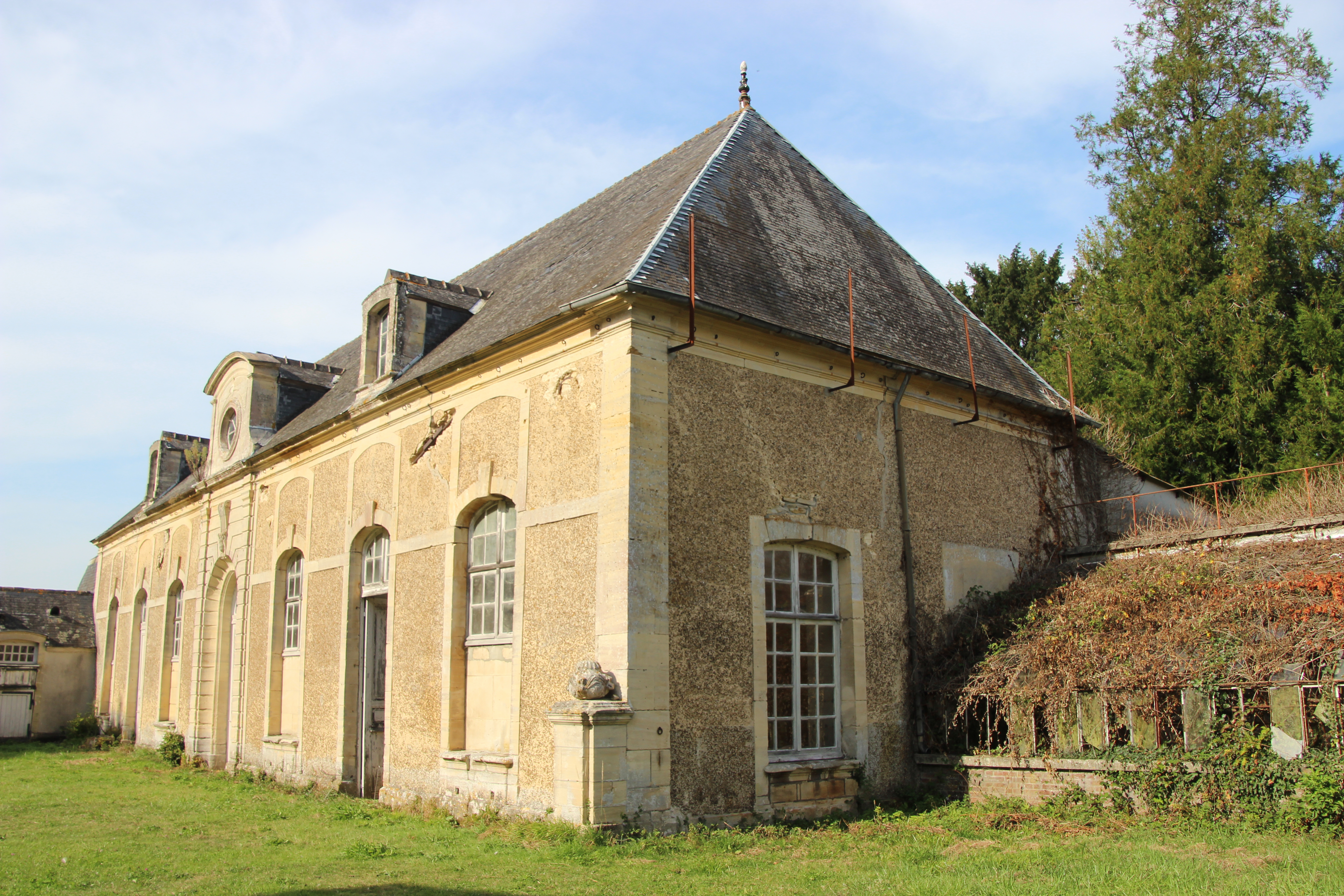
Stables building.

== Bibliography ==
- Baptiste, Hervé (2023). Magny-en-Bessin, histoire d'un château (in French). Bulletin de la société des antiquaires de Normandie.
- de Caumont, Arcisse. Statistique monumentale du Calvados (in French). L. Jouan.
- Collectif (2001). Le patrimoine des communes du Calvados (in French). Flohic. ISBN 2842341112.
- Gosselin, Louis (1963). Quelques notes concernant Nicolas-Joseph Foucault, intendant de Caen, et son château de Magny (in French). Bulletin de la société des antiquaires de Normandie.
- Maumené, Albert (1914). La Vie à la campagne : travaux, produits, plaisirs (in French). Hachette.
- Seydoux, Philippe (1985). Châteaux du pays d'Auge et du Bessin (in French). Éditions de la Morande.
- Deniaux, Elisabeth (2019). L'orientaliste Antoine Galland et la découverte des inscriptions de la cité des Viducasses en Normandie (PDF) (in French). Altera pars laboris Studi sulla tradizione manoscritta delle iscrizioni antiche. ISBN 978-88-6969-374-8.
