= Magny-en-Bessin =

- Commune
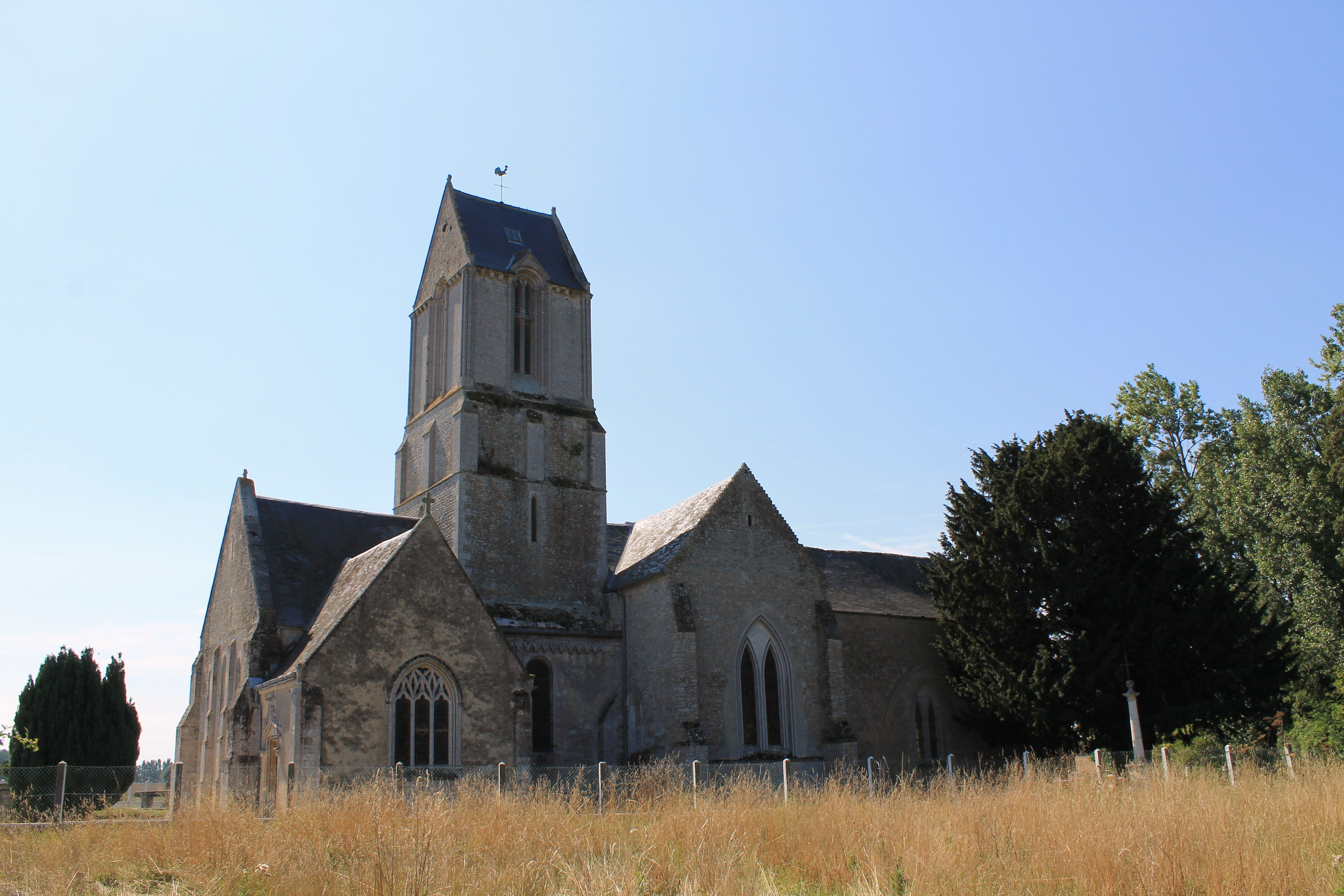
- The church in Magny-en-Bessin
- Location of Magny-en-Bessin
- Location within France Location within Normandy
- Coordinates: 49°18′24″N 0°39′46″W
- Country: France
- Region: Normandy
- Department: Calvados
- Arrondissement: Bayeux
- Canton: Bayeux
- Intercommunality: CC Bayeux Intercom

Government
  - Mayor (2020–2026): André Blet
- Area^{1}: 4.42 km^{2} (1.71 sq mi)
- Elevation: 50 m (160 ft)
- Highest elevation: 76 m (249 ft)
- Lowest elevation: 27 m (89 ft)
- Population (2023): 164
  - Density: 37.1/km^{2} (96.1/sq mi)
- Time zone: UTC+01:00 (CET)
  - Summer (DST): UTC+02:00 (CEST)
- INSEE/Postal code: 14385 /14400
- ^{1} French Land Register data, which excludes lakes, ponds, glaciers > 1 km^{2} (0.386 sq mi or 247 acres) and river estuaries.

Magny-en-Bessin (French pronunciation: [maɲi ɑ̃ bɛsɛ̃], literally Magny in Bessin) is a commune in the Calvados department in the Normandy region in northwestern France.

== Population ==
Historical population
Year	Pop.	±% p.a.
1968	69	—
1975	63	−1.29%
1982	103	+7.28%
1990	126	+2.55%
1999	109	−1.60%
2007	138	+2.99%
2012	157	+2.61%
2017	155	−0.26%
2023	164	+0.95%
Source: INSEE

== See also ==
- Communes of the Calvados department
- Château de Magny-en-Bessin
