= House of La Rochefoucauld =

French noble family

- Coat of arms
- Current region: Poitou, Île-de-France
- Earlier spellings: La Roche
- Etymology: Derived from the fortified hill (roche) where the family originated
- Origin: Angoumois, La Rochefoucauld, Charente, France
- Founded: 1019
- Founder: Foucauld I of La Roche
- Current head: François, 15th Duke of La Rochefoucauld
- Distinctions: Order of Saint Louis; Order of the Holy Spirit
- Traditions: Catholic Church
- Motto: C'est mon plaisir (French for 'It is my pleasure')
- Estates: List: Château de Verteuil; La Rochefoucauld Castle; Château de La Roche-Guyon; Château de Combreux; Château de Vaugien; Château de Maillot; Château de Versainville; Château de la Lande; Château de Douy; Château de la Barre; Château de Pont-Chevron; Château de Fréteval; Château de L'Ormeteau

Coat of arms of Roye de la Rochefoucauld

The House of La Rochefoucauld is an ancient family of French nobility. Its earliest origins date back to the 10th century, in the area of what is now the village of La Rochefoucauld, 400 kilometres (250 mi) southwest by south of Paris. The family's lineage begins with Foucauld I of La Roche (973–1047), the first Lord of La Roche, later known as La Rochefoucauld (Roche + Foucauld). He was possibly the son of Adémar of La Roche, also known as Amaury or Esmerin (circa 952 – before 1037), Lord of La Roche. Over the centuries, the family rose in prominence, earning numerous titles and distinctions.

== Overview of titles and roles ==
In April 1622, Louis XIII elevated the County (comté) of La Rochefoucauld to a Duchy and Peerage by Letters Patent issued at Niort (registered 4 September 1631). This act formally raised François V of La Rochefoucauld (1588–1650) from Count to the inaugural Duke of La Rochefoucauld, as well as to the status of Peer of France.

Upon its elevation in 1622, the Duchy of La Rochefoucauld became united with the lordships of Verteuil, Daunart, Joussaume, Vivier, Montignac, Touriers, Celfroin, Saint Clos, La Mothe, and Saint-Angeau. Later, in 1732, the Duchy was further united with the lordships of Marcillac, Anville, Génac, and Ambérac. However, in 1765, these additions were separated from the Duchy.

The former County of La Rochefoucauld had been established in 1528 through the union of the Barony of La Rochefoucauld, the Barony of Marthon, and the Châtellenies of Blanzac, Montignac, Verteuil, Saint-Laurent-de-Céris, and Cellefrouin.

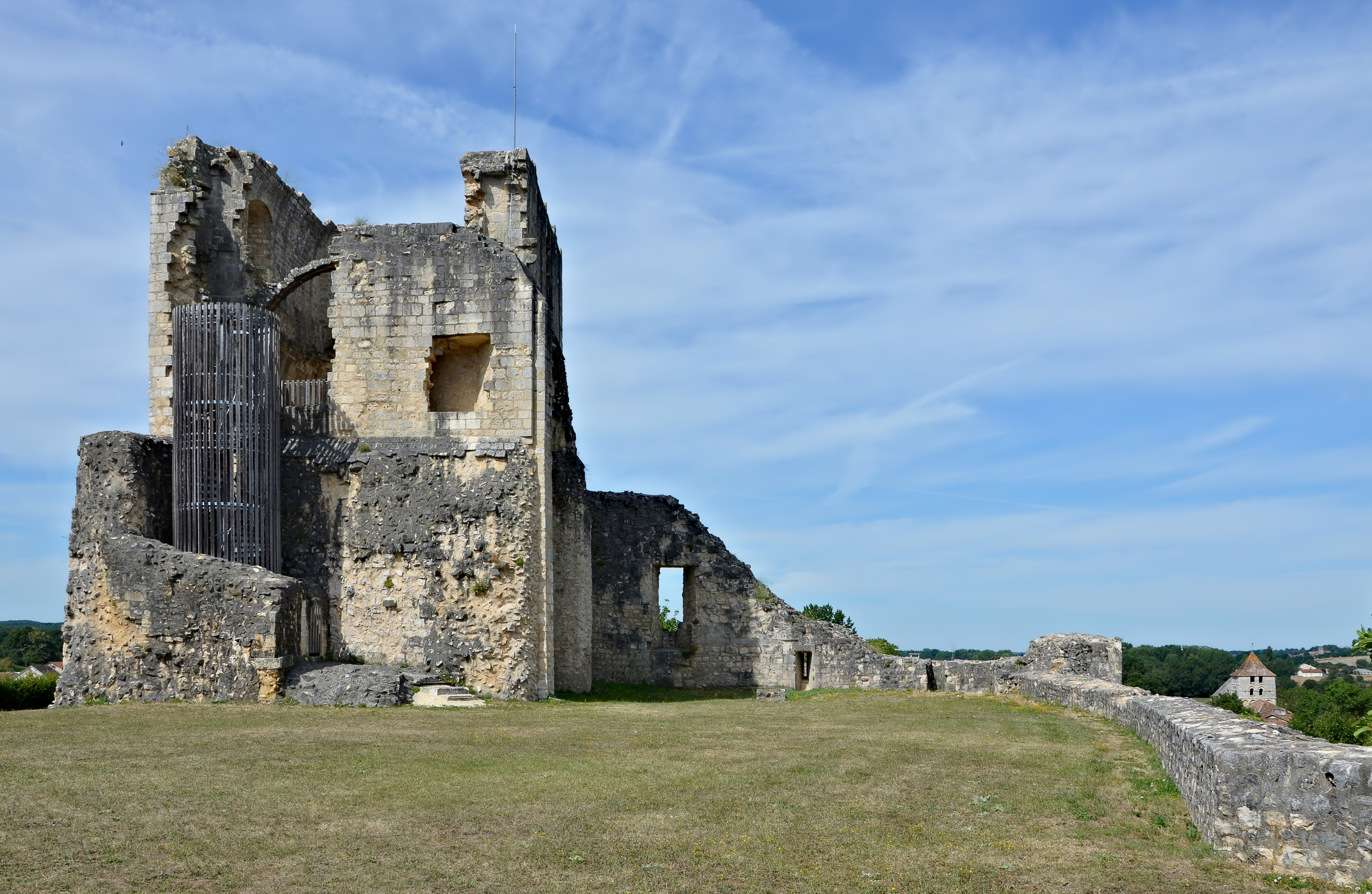
Château de Marthon.

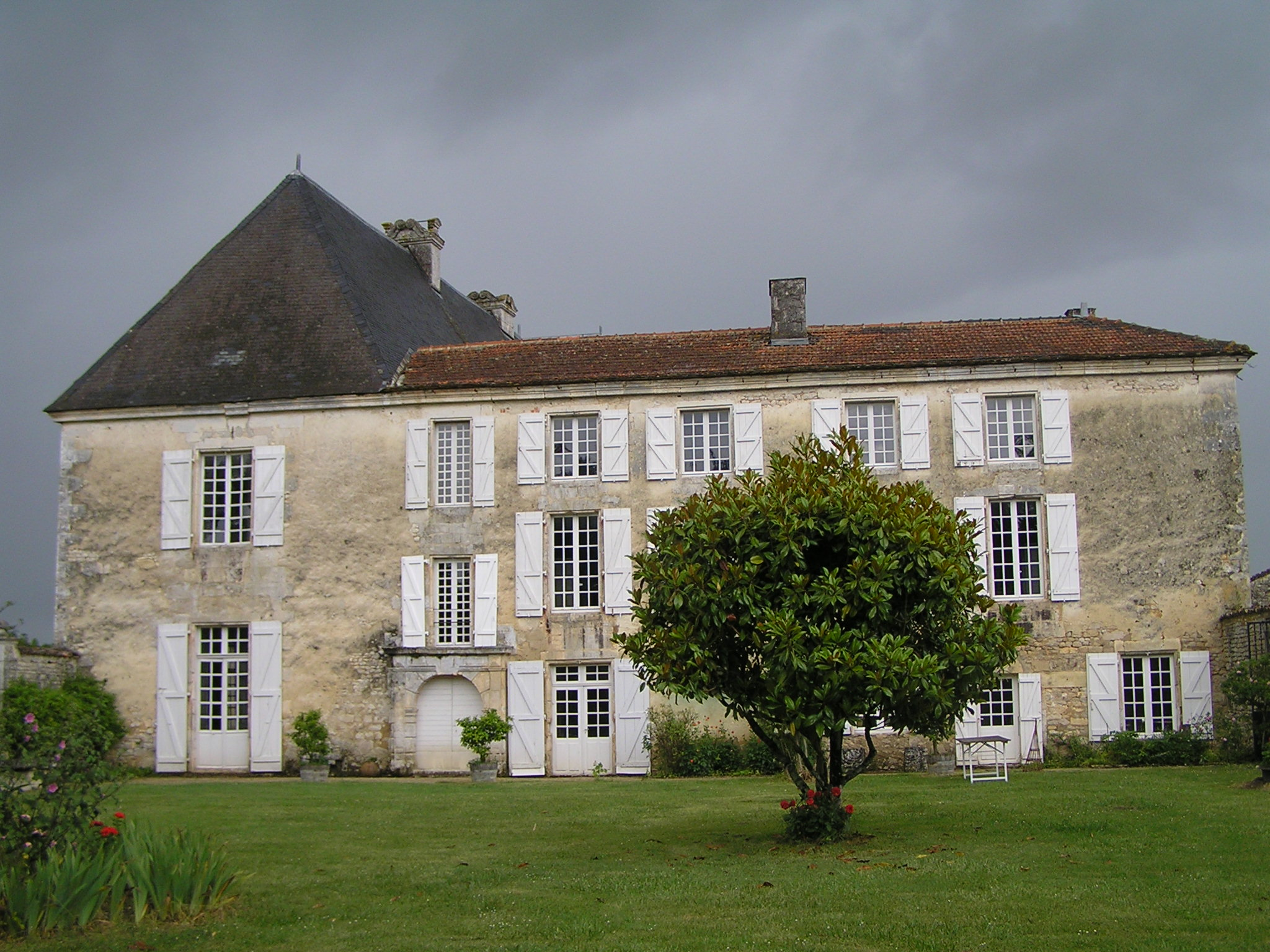
Château de Balzac

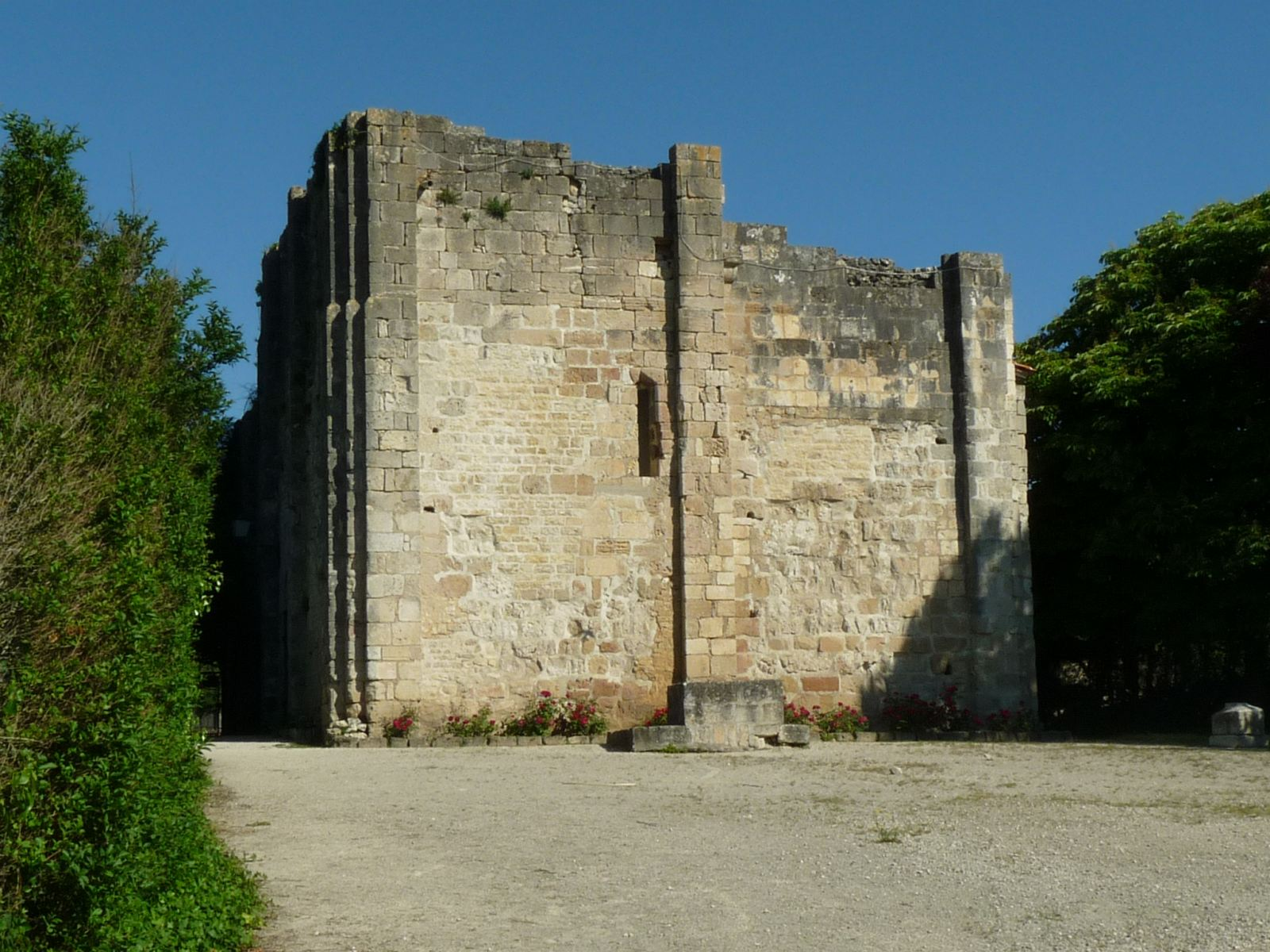
Château de Montignac – Pierre II d'Amboise (c. 1357–1426), Viscount of Thouars, sold it to the La Rochefoucauld 13 January 1399.

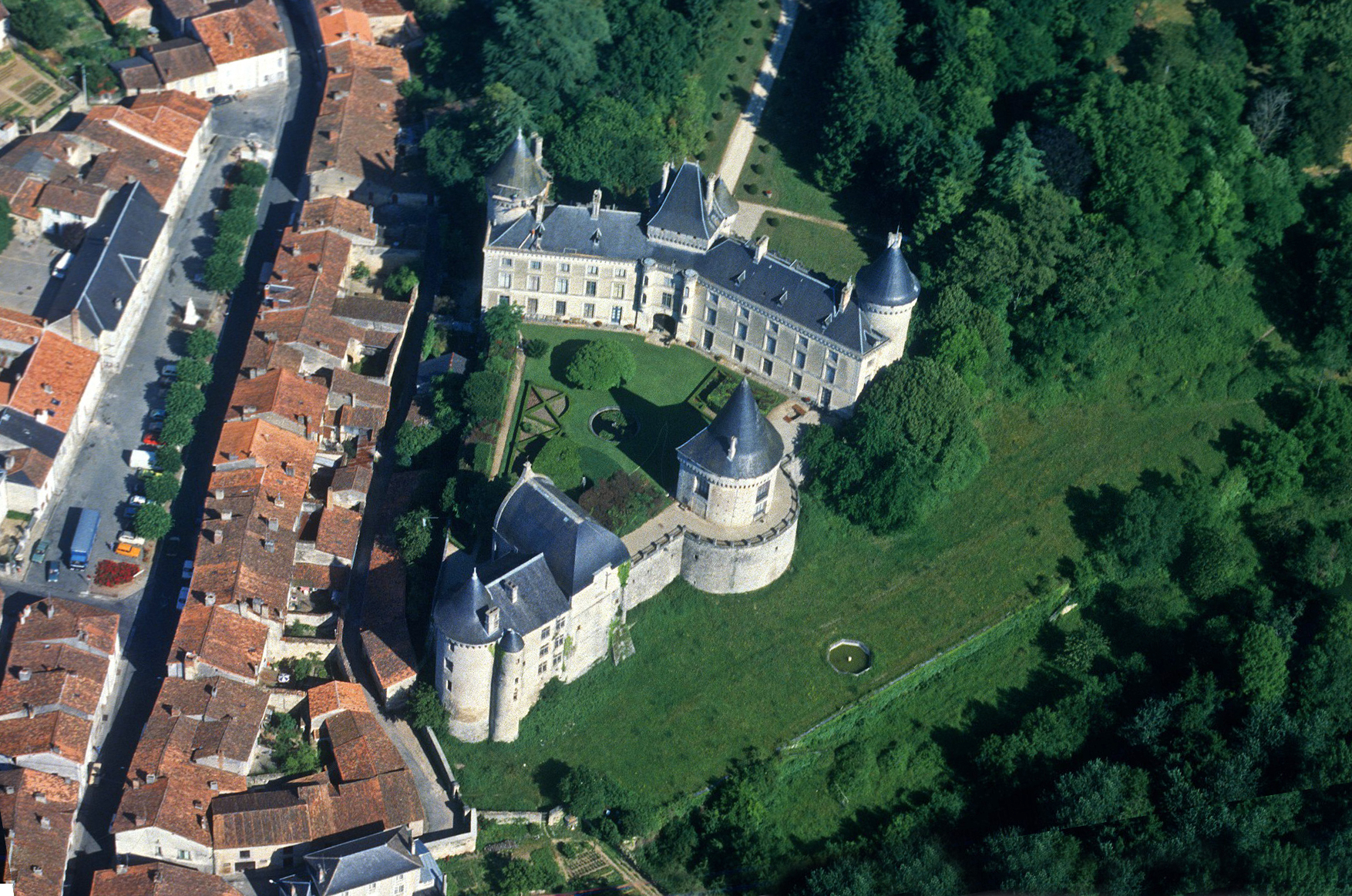
Château de Verteuil.

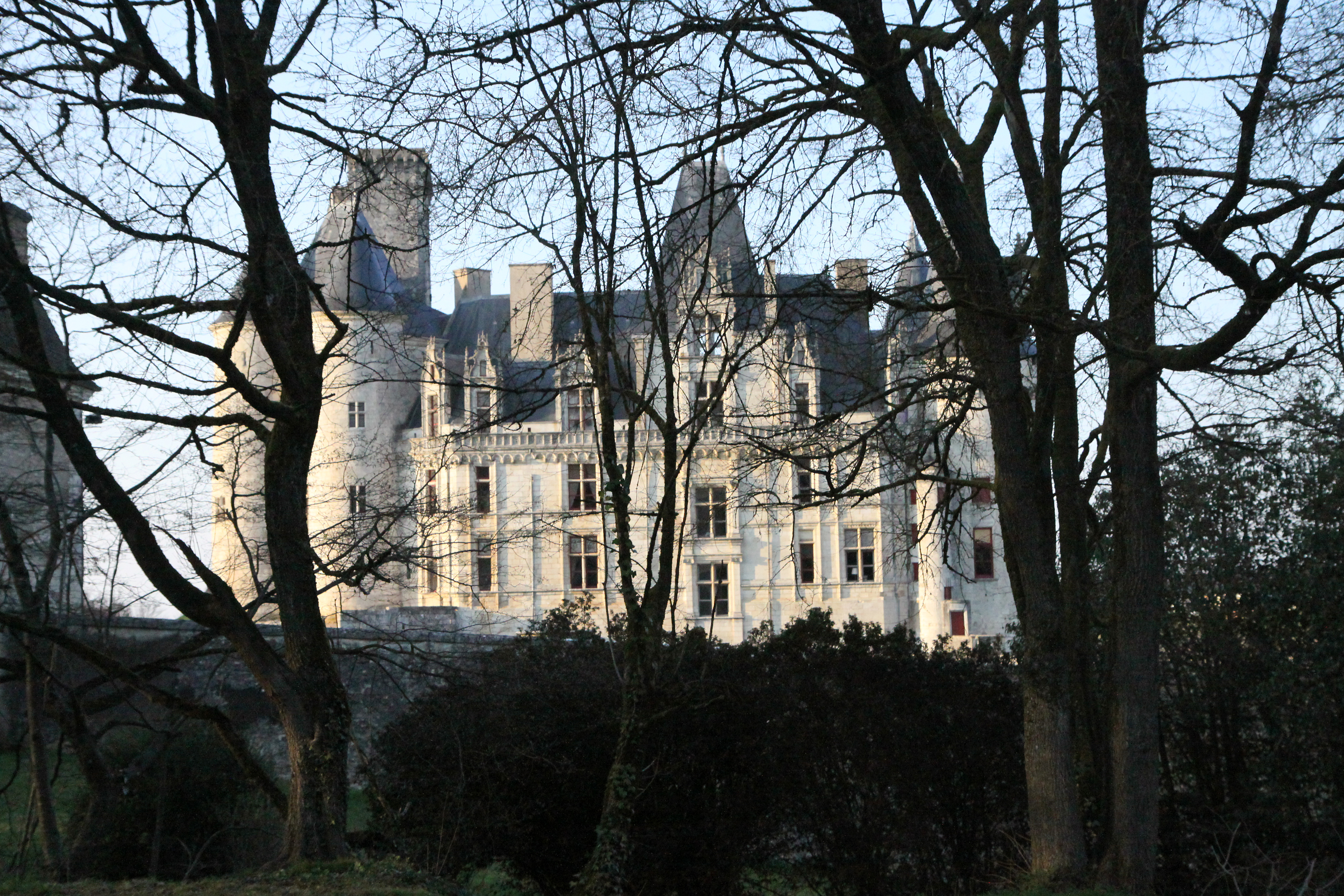
Château de La Rochefoucauld

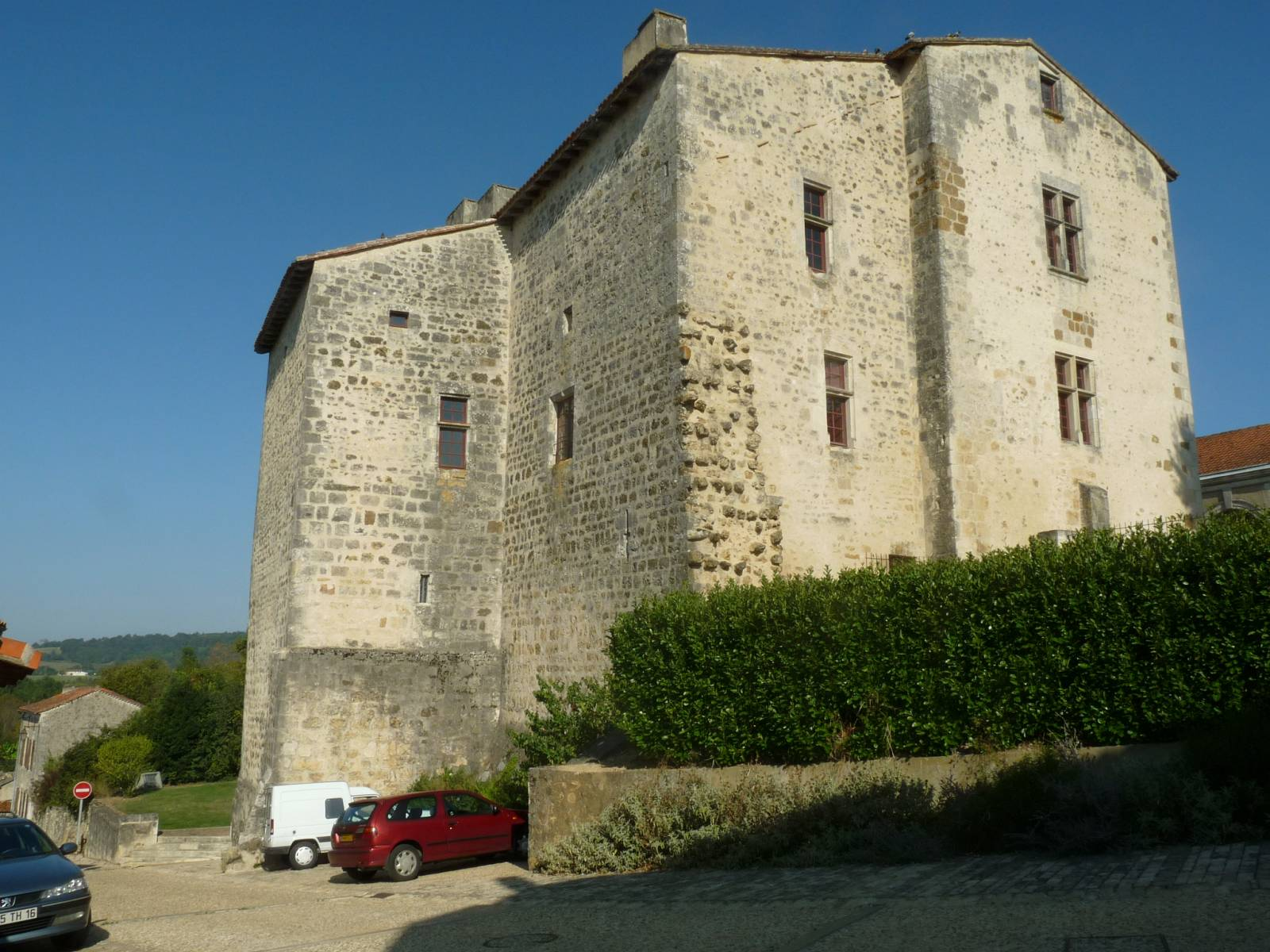
Château de Montbron

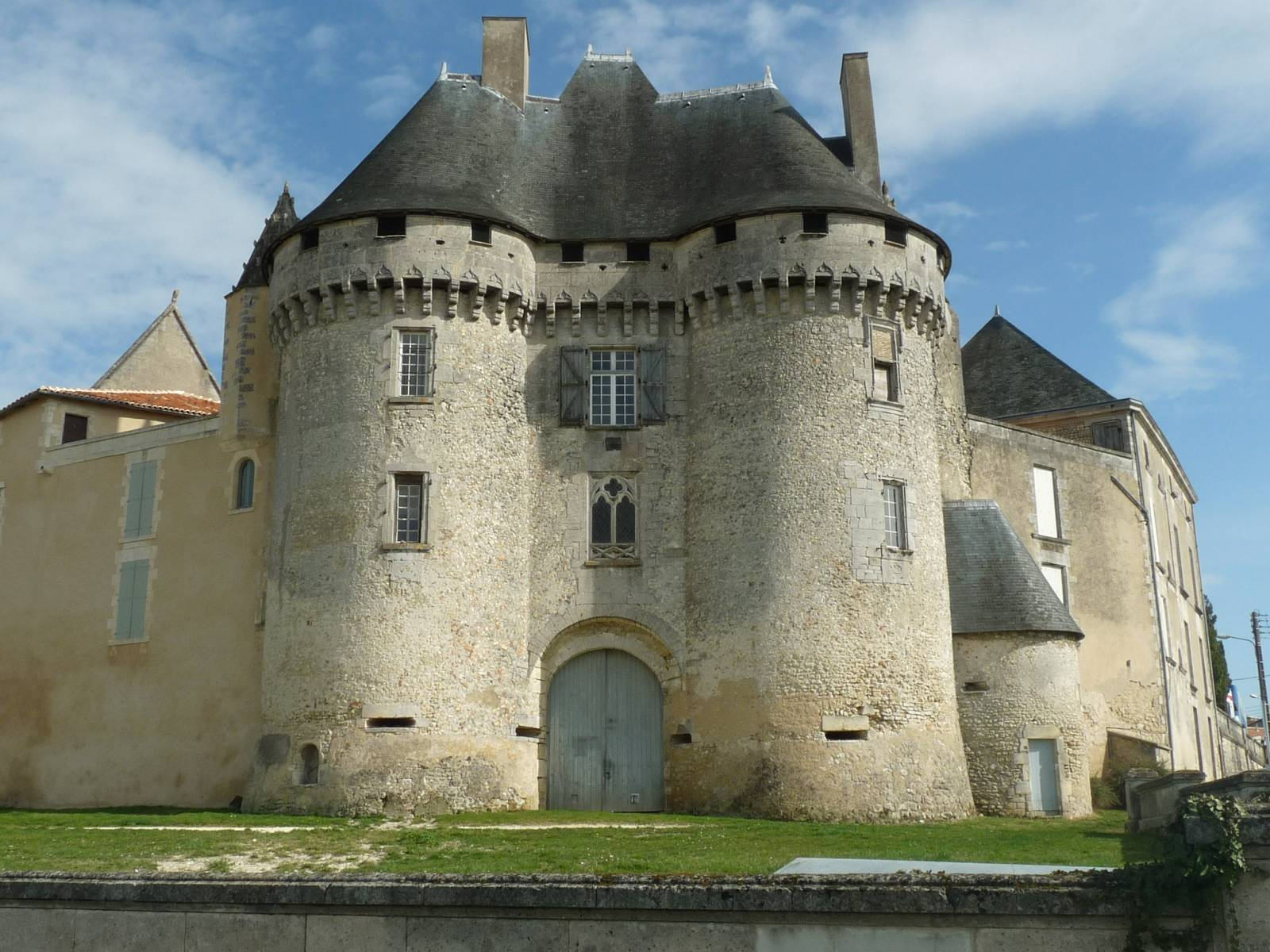
Château de Barbezieux

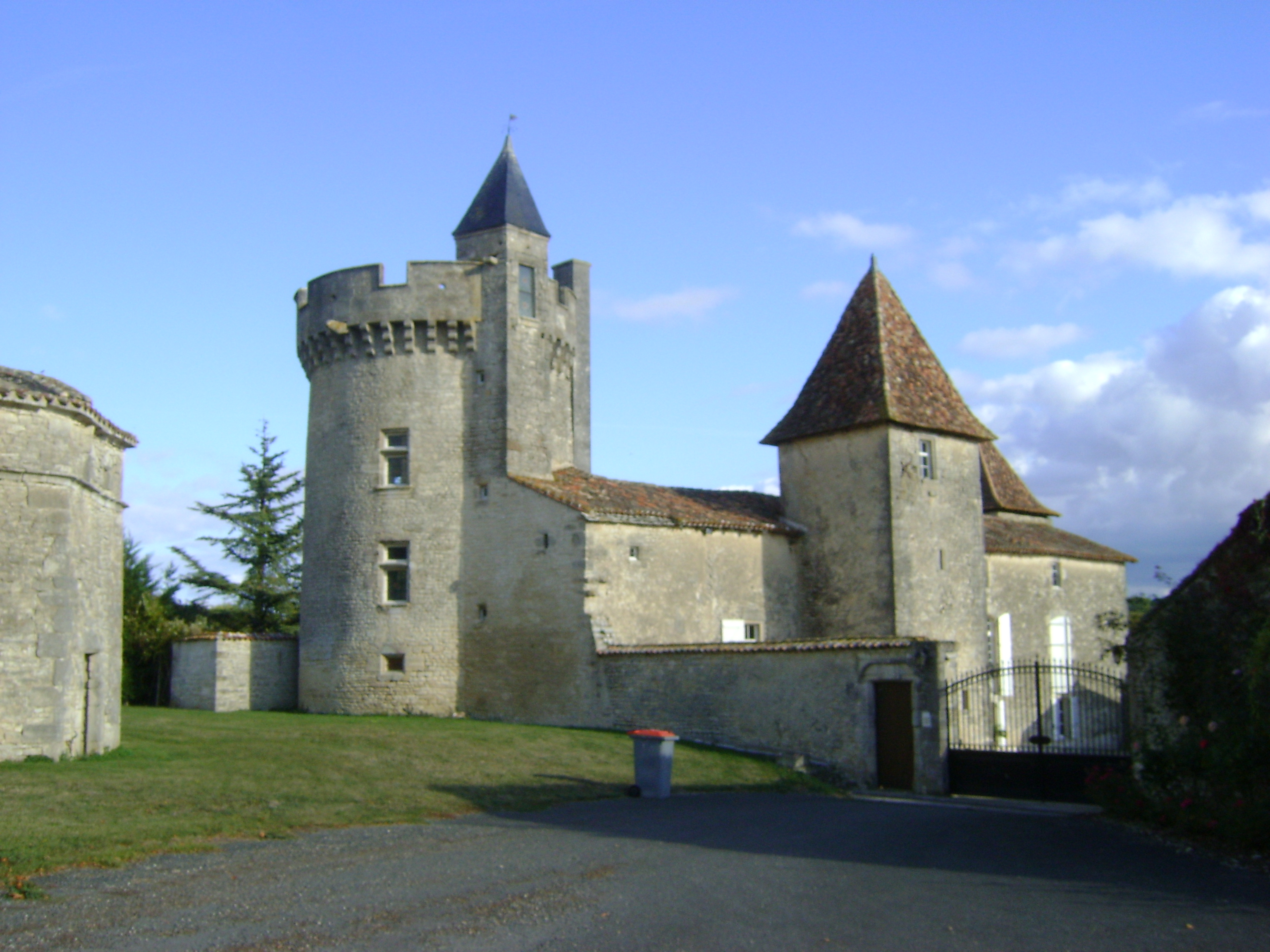
Château de la Barre

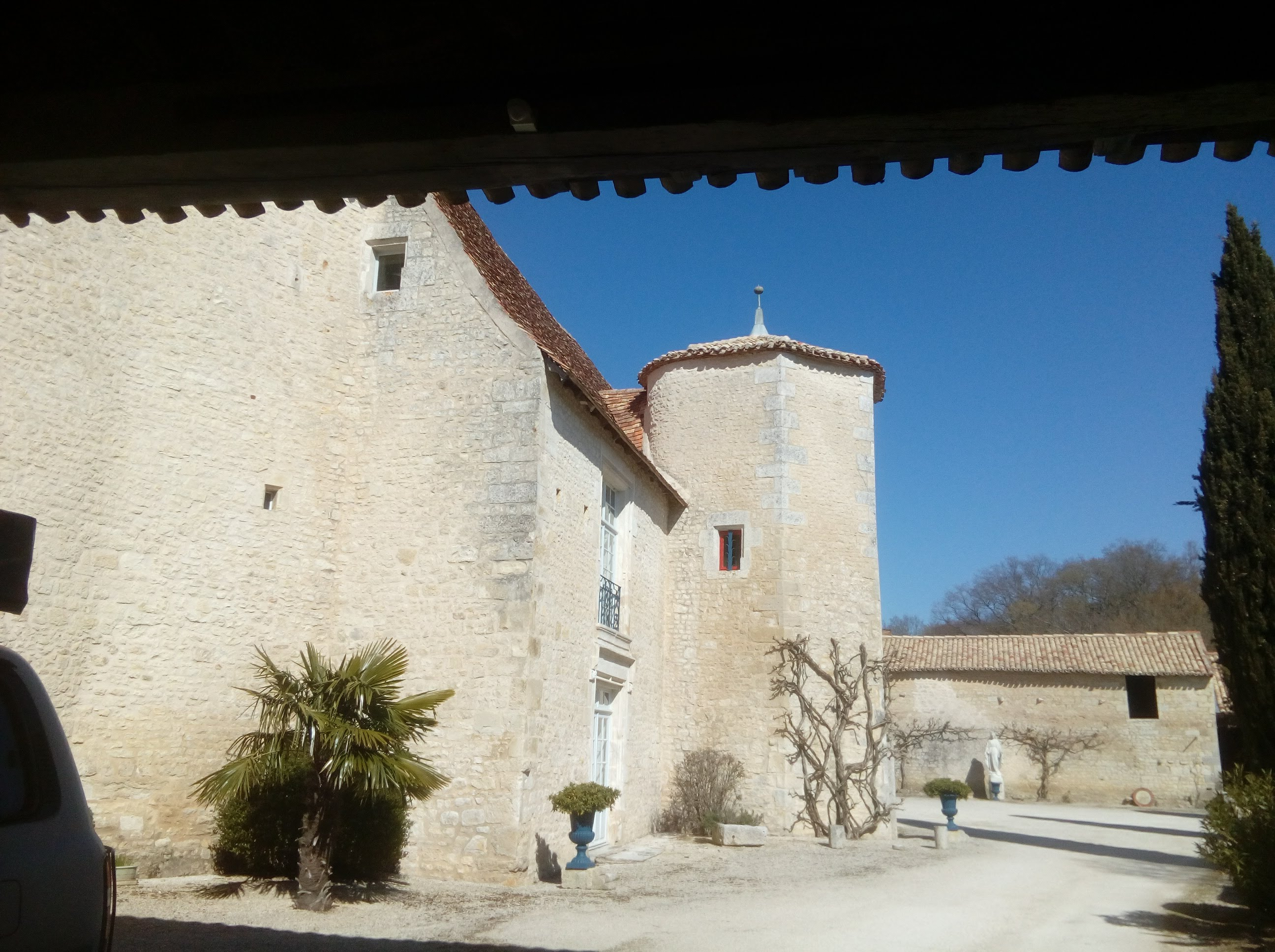
Lugérat Lodge in Montignac

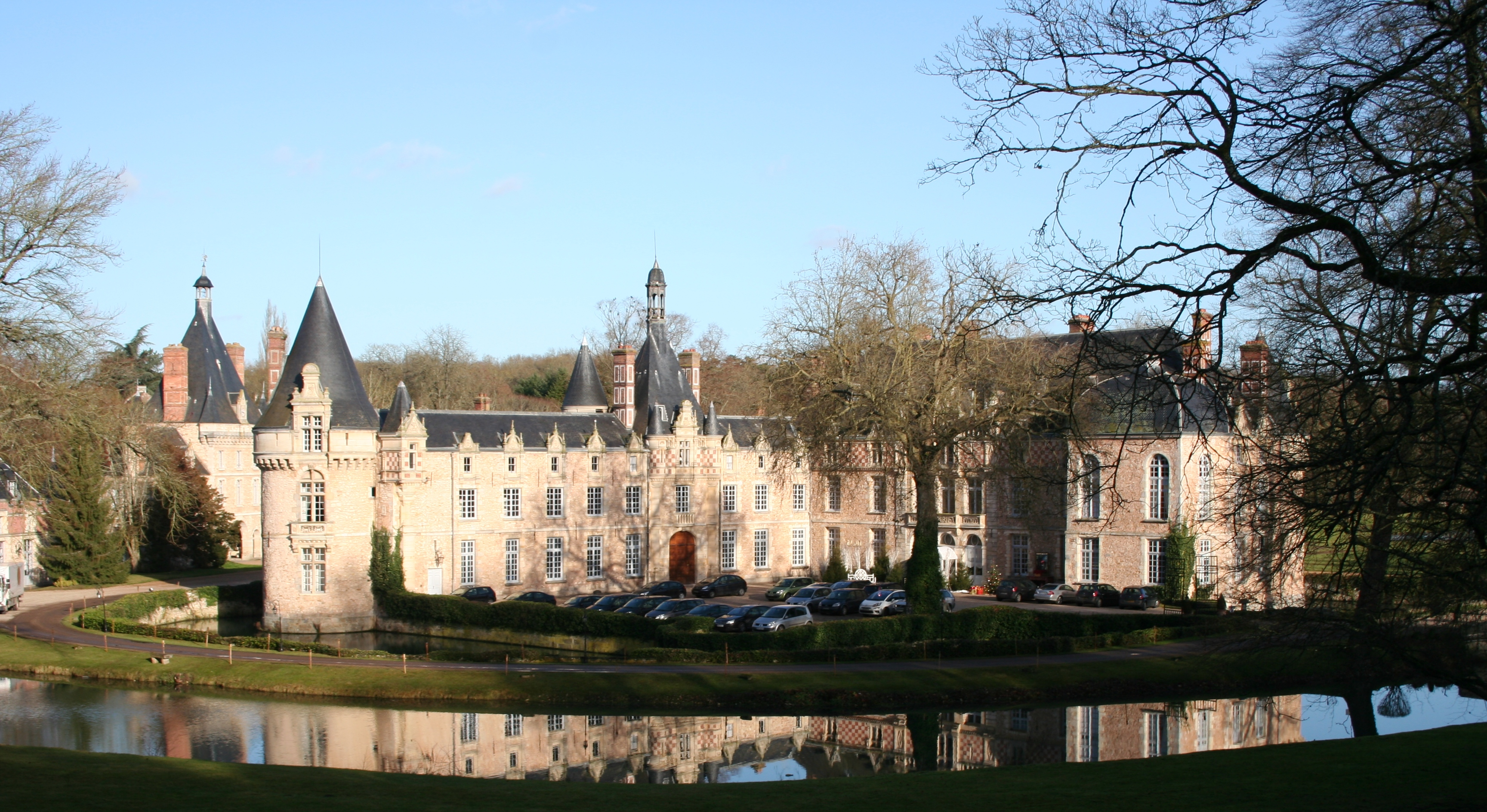
Château d'Esclimont, Auneau-Bleury-Saint-Symphorien

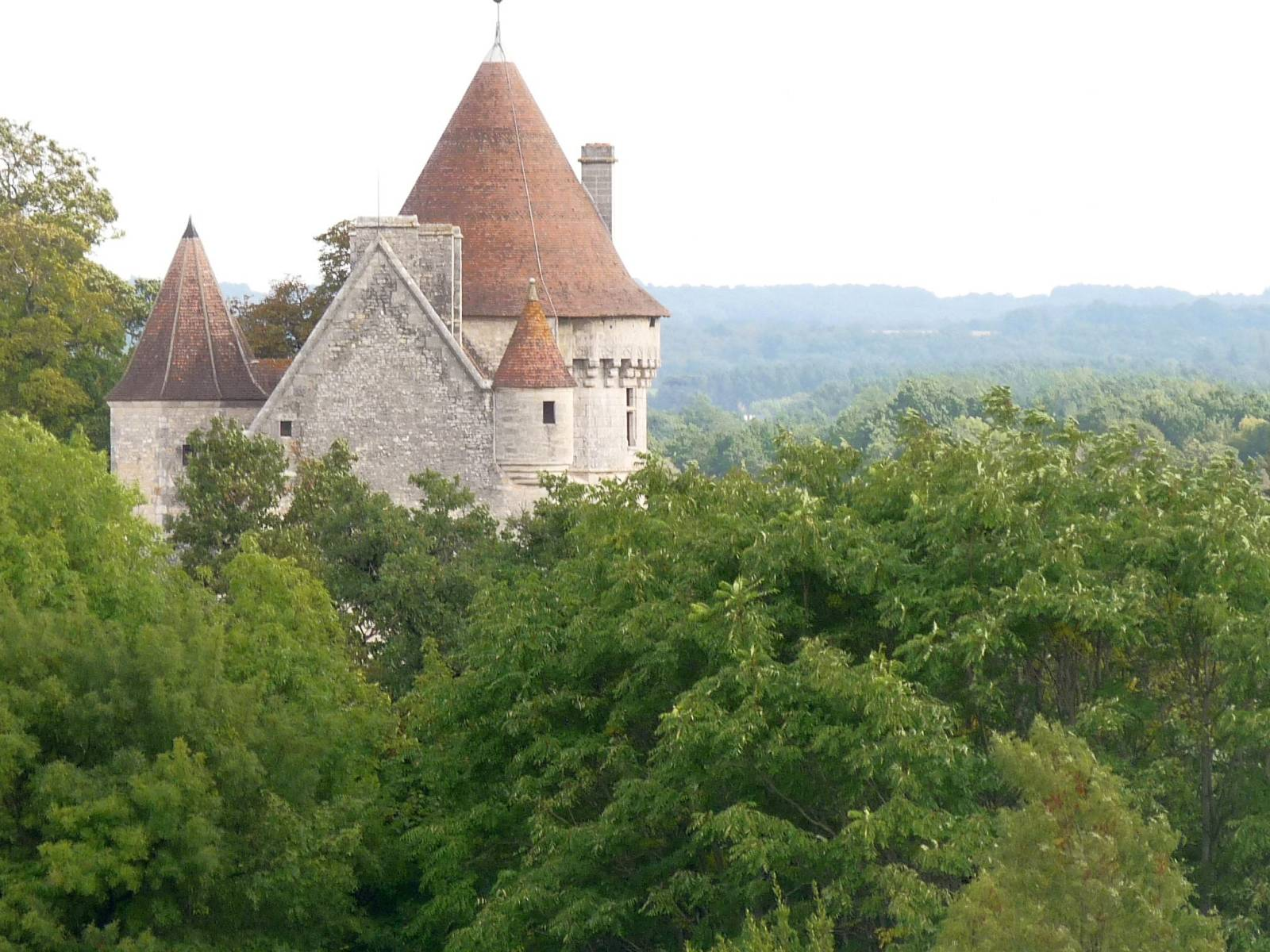
Château de Bayers

Earlier titles held by the family included Baron (13th century) and Count (1528), the latter granted to François I of La Rochefoucauld (1450–1541), godfather of King François I. François V of La Rochefoucauld (1588–1650) married Gabrielle du Plessis-Liancourt (1592–1672) (Wikidata – Wikidata Q108941990), daughter of Antoinette of Pons (1560–1632), and their son François VI (1613–1680) became a leading figure of La Fronde and is celebrated as the author of the Maxims.

During the 17th and 18th centuries, the family continued to ascend socially and politically. They were titled as Princes of Marcillac in the 16th century, while François VII, a close friend of Louis XIV, married Jeanne du Plessis-Liancourt (1644–1669). Their son, François VIII (1663–1728), became the Duke of La Roche-Guyon in 1679 and married Marie Madeleine Charlotte Le Tellier (1664–1735) (Wikidata – Wikidata Q108942002), the daughter of François Michel Le Tellier (1641–1691) of Louvois, prime minister to Louis XIV.

In the 18th century, the family acquired several additional titles, including Duke of Liancourt, Duke of Enville, and Duke of Estissac. François XII (1747–1827), an eminent philanthropist, is famously remembered for his statement to Louis XVI during the French Revolution: "Sir, it's not a revolt; it's a revolution." Over time, they also became the Prince of La Rochefoucauld-Montbel, Duke of Doudeauville, Duke of Estrées, and Duke of Bisaccia.

The La Rochefoucauld family held numerous other titles and roles, including Marquises of (i) Montendre (§ Marquises of Montendre), (ii) Barbezieux, (iii) Surgères (§ Marquis of Surgères), and (iv) Bayers (§ Marquis of Bayers); and Counts of (i) Duretal, (ii) Roye, and (iii) Roucy; and Baron of Verteuil. Family members were also prominent in the Catholic Church, producing cardinals and bishops; and two family members, Pierre-Louis of La Rochefoucauld-Bayers (1744–1792) and François-Joseph of La Rochefoucauld-Bayers (1736–1792), were massacred during the French Revolution and later beatified.

The family's legacy extends beyond nobility, with members serving as ambassadors, generals, and ministers, including (i) Robert de La Rochefoucauld (1923–2012), a WWII spy and third great-grandson of François of La Rochefoucauld (1765–1848), the 8th Duke of La Rochefoucauld (§ Dukes of Estissac) and (ii) a UK field marshal. They also held prestigious positions such as Grand Hospitaller of the Order of Malta and founded notable clubs like the Jockey Club de Paris. Many were elevated in the National Order of the Legion of Honour, and approximately 40 members have been, or still are, part of the Sovereign Military Order of Malta.

The family's ancestral seat, the La Rochefoucauld Castle, has been in their possession since the 10th century. Additionally, the La Rochefoucauld-Montbel family owned the Lascaux Cave at the time of their discovery and maintain ties to the Pellevoisin sanctuary, a site of Marian apparitions (reported supernatural appearances of the Virgin Mary - recognition by nihil obstat in 2024) in France.

== Origins of the name ==
Authors have advanced, albeit with piecemeal evidence, that the first member of this family was Adémar, known as Amaury or Esmerin, by Viscounty of Limoges, or the son of the lord Hugh I of Lusignan. This latter hypothesis could be reinforced by the armorial bearings of the family. The late historian, André Debord (1926–1996), attributes the origins of the House of La Rochefoucauld to the House of Montbron in the 12th century, contrasting with theories that link their ancestry to Adémar (Amaury/Esmerin) or the Lusignan family. The seigniory (lordship) of La Roche was originally a barony in the 13th century. The descendants of Foucauld I of La Roche (c. 978–1046) and his wife, Jarsande of Châtellérault (c. 994–1026), united their name Foucauld (La Roche + Foucauld).

== Lords then Barons of La Rochefoucauld (10th–15th centuries) ==
=== 1st House of La Rochefoucauld: Lords of La Roche ===
1. Adémar of La Roche (952–1037).
2. Foucauld I of La Roche (978–1047) (son of preceding), Lord of La Rochefoucauld; married to Jarsande and had four children.
3. Guy I of La Roche (1010–1060) (son of preceding), Lord of La Rochefoucauld, founded in 1060 the priory of Saint-Florent de La Rochefoucauld.
4. Guy II of La Roche (1035–1081) (son of preceding), Lord of La Rochefoucauld; married Eve and had three children.
5. Guy III of La Roche (1060–1120) (son of preceding), Lord of La Rochefoucauld.
6. Aymar of La Roche (1060–1140) (son of preceding), Lord of La Rochefoucauld and of Verteuil, led several wars against Wulgrin II, Count of Angoulême, married Mathilde of Chabanais (c. 1100 – c. 1140) and had a daughter, Emma de La Rochefoucauld (born about 1115), who married Robert of Marthon (born about 1090), Lord of Marthon.

=== 2nd House of La Rochefoucauld: Lords of Marthon ===
1. Robert of Marthon
2. Guy IV of La Rochefoucauld (son of preceding), took his mother's name and became Lord of La Rochefoucauld, Verteuil, Marthon, Blanzac. He took part in the wars against William, Count of Angoulême; married the daughter of Aimery, Viscount of Rochechouart, and had two children.
3. Foucauld II of La Rochefoucauld (son of preceding), Lord of La Rochefoucauld, Verteuil, Blanzac, Marthon, he served in the army of the King Philip II Augustus and was made prisoner in 1198 at the Battle of Gisors. He was father of four children.
4. Guy V of La Rochefoucauld (son of preceding), founded the Cordeliers Convent d'Angoulême in 1230.
  1. Aimery I of La Rochefoucauld (1190–1249) (brother of preceding and son of Foucauld II), Lord of La Rochefoucauld in 1219, and of Verteuil, Count of La Marche; married Létice de Parthenay and had five children.
5. Guy VI of La Rochefoucauld (son of preceding), Lord of La Rochefoucauld, of Verteuil, of Marthon, of Saint Claud, of Saint Laurent, of Blanzac and of Cellefrouin (d. 1295), rallied to the cause of Hugues VII of Lusignan, Count of La Marche, against King Louis IX, retired to Grosbos Abbey; married Agnès de Rochechouart and had nine children.
6. Aimery II of La Rochefoucauld (son of preceding), Baron of La Rochefoucauld, Lord of Verteuil, of Marthon, of Saint Claud, of Saint Laurent, of Blanzac, of Monteil and of Cellefrouin (c. 1265–1295); married Dauphine de La Tour-d'Auvergne in 1280, and had five children.
7. Guy VII of La Rochefoucauld (1285–1356) (son of preceding), Baron of La Rochefoucauld; he (i) in 1309, married Agnès de Culant (c. 1285 – c. 1353) and had nine children, (ii) served King Philip V against the County of Flanders from 1317 to 1318, (iii) was excommunicated by Bishop Aiguelin de Blaye, (iv) founded the Couvent des Carmes de La Rochefoucauld in 1329, and (v) was killed 19 September 1356, next to the King Jean II during the Battle of Poitiers.
8. Aimery III de La Rochefoucauld (died 1362) (son of preceding), Baron of La Rochefoucauld (d. 1362), who served King Philippe VI in 1338; married Rogette de Grailly.
9. Guy VIII de La Rochefoucauld (son of preceding), Baron of La Rochefoucauld, governor of l'Angoumois, Councillor and Grand Chamberlain of France of Kings Charles V, Charles VI and of Philip II of Burgundy, he acquired the lands of Marcillac and Montignac; married (i) Jeanne de Luxembourg, and (ii) Marguerite de Craon and had eight children.
10. Foucauld III de La Rochefoucauld (died 1467) (son of preceding), Baron of La Rochefoucauld, Councillor, chamberlain of King Charles VII, participated in the Siege of Fronsac, rescued King Charles VII at the battle of Castillon (which marked the end of the Hundred Years War); married Jeanne de Rochechouart.
11. Jean I of La Rochefoucauld (1430–1471) (son of preceding), Baron of La Rochefoucauld, Marthon, Blanzac, Bayers, Montignac, Marcillac, Councillor and Grand Chamberlain of France for Kings Louis XI and Charles VIII, and governor of Bayonne, in 27 August 1446, married his cousin Marguerite de La Rochefoucauld (died 1533), Lady of Barbezieux and Montendre.

== Counts of La Rochefoucauld (and Princes of Marcillac) (16th century) ==
In April 1528, King Francis I gave his godfather, François I of La Rochefoucauld (son of Jean I of La Rochefoucauld), the title of Count of La Rochefoucauld (French: Comte de La Rochefoucauld).

11. François I of La Rochefoucauld (1450–1516) (son of preceding), Count of La Rochefoucauld, Chambellan of Kings Charles VIII and Louis XII, on 30 April 1470, married Louise of Crussol (1450–1473), daughter of Louis Bastet of Crussol (1425–1473). In 1500, he married Barbe Jeanne of Fiennes du Bois d'Esquerdes (1480–1528) (Wikidata – Wikidata Q102826927)
12. François II of La Rochefoucauld (1494–1533) (son of preceding), Count of La Rochefoucauld, Prince of Marcillac, Baron of Verteuil, in 1518, married Anne of Polignac (1495–1554) (Wikidata – Wikidata Q108941904), Lady of Randan and Beaumont.
13. François III of La Rochefoucauld (1521–1572) (son of preceding), Count of La Rochefoucauld, Prince of Marcillac, Count of Roucy, Baron of Verteuil, he was killed at the St. Bartholomew's Day massacre, in 1552, married Sylvie Pic of La Mirandole (1530–1554), and in 1557, married Charlotte of Roye (1537–1571) (Wikidata – Wikidata Q60321119), Countess of Roucy (sister-in-law to Louis I of Bourbon-Condé).
14. François IV of La Rochefoucauld (1554–1591) (son of preceding), Count of La Rochefoucauld, Prince of Marcillac, Baron of Verteuil, a Protestant, he was killed at Saint-Yrieix by the Catholic League; married Claude d'Estissac in 1587.
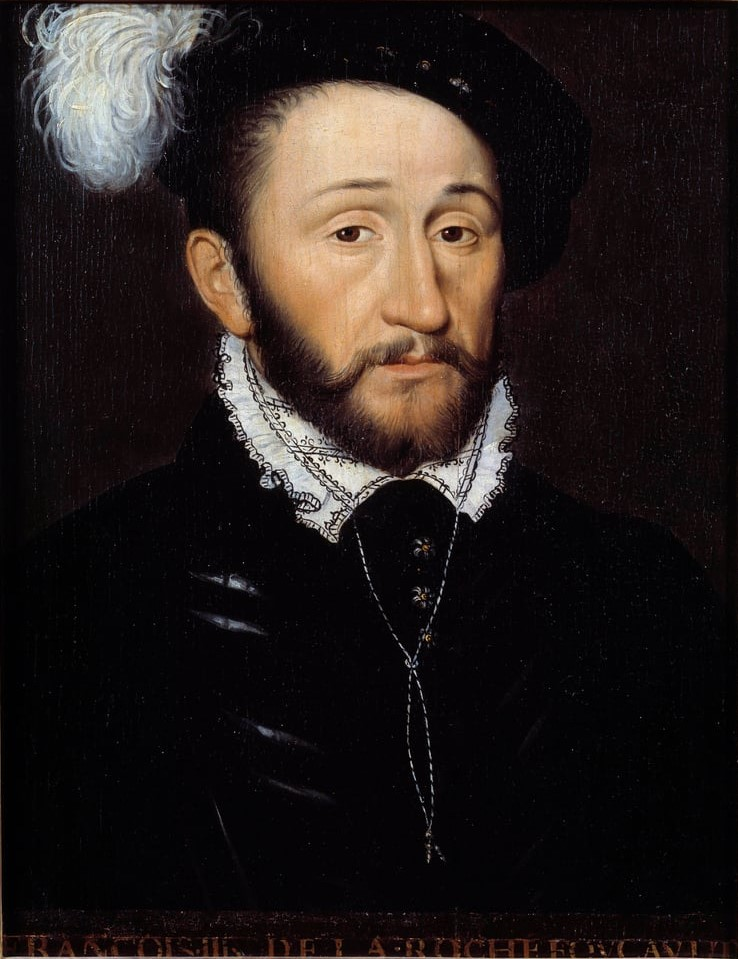
François III (1521–1572), Count of La Rochefoucauld.

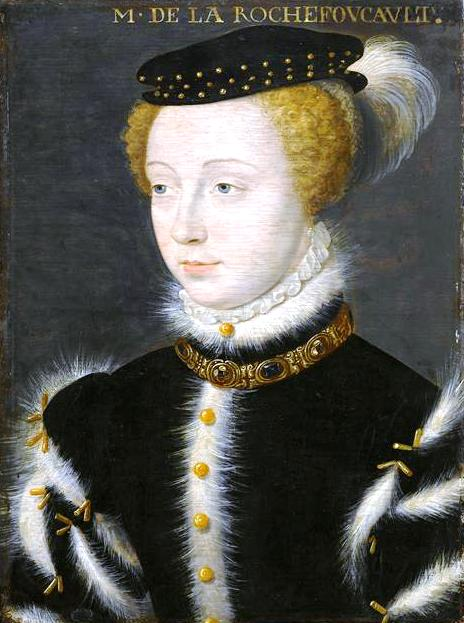
Charlotte of Roye (1537–1571)

== Dukes of La Rochefoucauld (17th–21st centuries) ==
=== Elder branch ===
On 22 April 1622, King Louis XIII raised the Count of La Rochefoucauld into a Duchy-peerage as the Duke of La Rochefoucauld (French: Duc de La Rochefoucauld).

15. François V of La Rochefoucauld (Frans of La Rochefoucauld; 1588–1650) (son of preceding), 1st Duke of La Rochefoucauld, in 1611 he married Gabrielle of Plessis-Liancourt (1595–1672), daughter of Antoinette de Pons, sister of Roger of Plessis-Liancourt (1598–1674), Duke of Liancourt.
16. François VI of La Rochefoucauld (1613–1680) (son of preceding), 2nd Duke of La Rochefoucauld, Prince of Marcillac, moralist writer:
  1. Réflexions ou sentences et maximes morales [The Reflections or Moral Sentences and Maxims]. 1747 re-print (University of Lausanne). 1664
  2. Mémoires de M.D.L.R. [Memories of Monsieur de La Rochefoucauld]. 1662
  3. And, he also wrote a history of the Fronde.
17. In 1628, he married Andrée of Vivonne (1605–1670).
18. François VII of La Rochefoucauld (1634–1714) (son of preceding), 3rd Duke of La Rochefoucauld, Prince of Marcillac, Grand veneur de France, grand maître de la garde robe of the king, one of Louis XIV closest friend, married his cousin Jeanne Charlotte of Plessis-Liancourt (1638–1710), great granddaughter of Antoinette de Pons and heiress of the Duke of La Roche-Guyon. She brought the domains of La Roche-Guyon and Liancourt in the La Rochefoucauld family.
19. François VIII of La Rochefoucauld (1663–1728) (son of preceding), 4th Duke of La Rochefoucauld, grand maître de la garde robe of the King, Duke of La Roche-Guyon in 1679, Prince of Marcillac; married to Magdeleine Charlotte of Tellier (1664–1735), daughter of François Michel Le Tellier de Louvois. (Note: His eldest son, François IX de La Rochefoucauld (1681–1699), predeceased him and was succeeded by his younger son, Alexandre.)
  1. Alexandre I of La Rochefoucauld (né Alexandre Louis de La Rochefoucauld; 1690–1762) (son of François VIII), 5th Duke of La Rochefoucauld, grand maître de la garde robe of the King, duke of La Roche-Guyon, Prince of Marcillac, married, in 1715, Elisabeth Marie Louise Nicole van Bermond of Caylar (1691–1752) of Toiras in Amboise. (Note: They had two sons, François X de La Rochefoucauld (1717–1718) and François XI de La Rochefoucauld (1720–1721), who both died young. They also had two daughters, Marie-Louise-Nicole de La Rochefoucauld (1716–1797), known as "Mademoiselle de La Rochefoucauld", and Marie-Elisabeth de La Rochefoucauld (b. 1718), known as "Mademoiselle de La Roche-Guyon", who both married their cousins from the younger branch of Roye.)
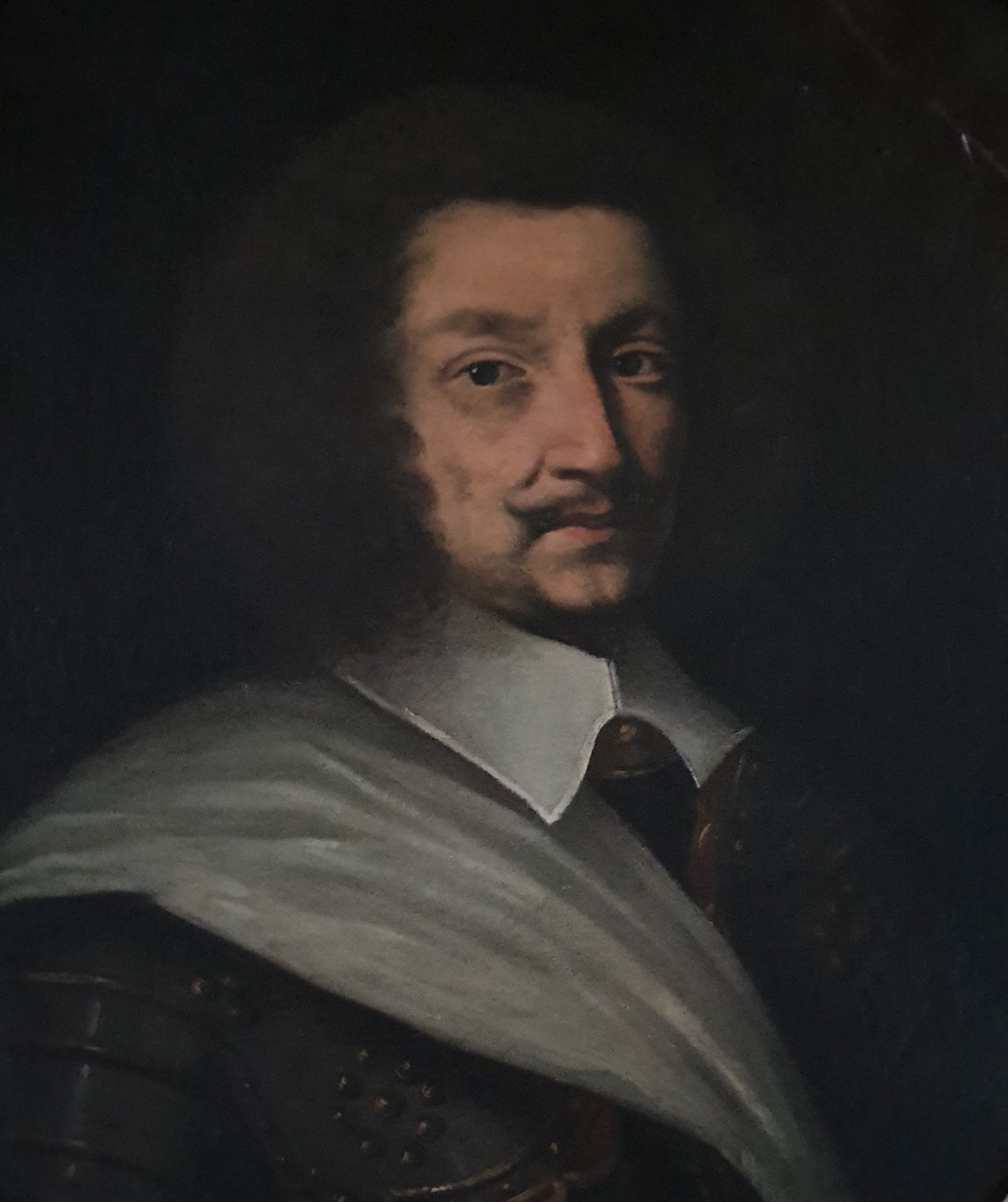
François V of La Rochefoucauld (Frans of La Rochefoucauld; 1588–1650).

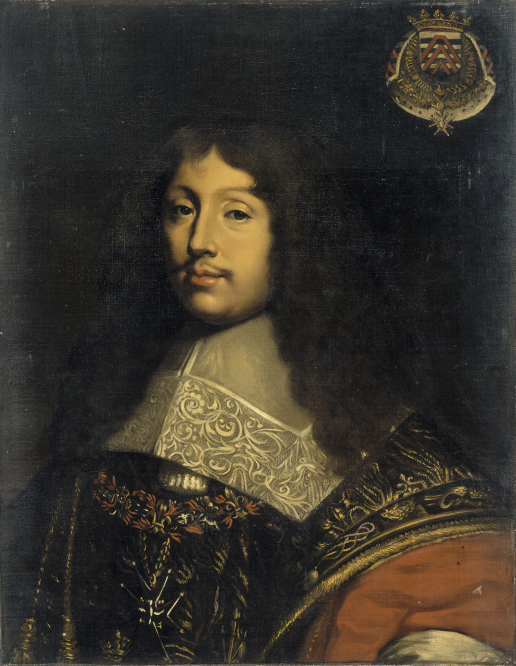
François VI of La Rochefoucauld (1613–1680). Théodore Chassériau (1819–1856), artist (1836).

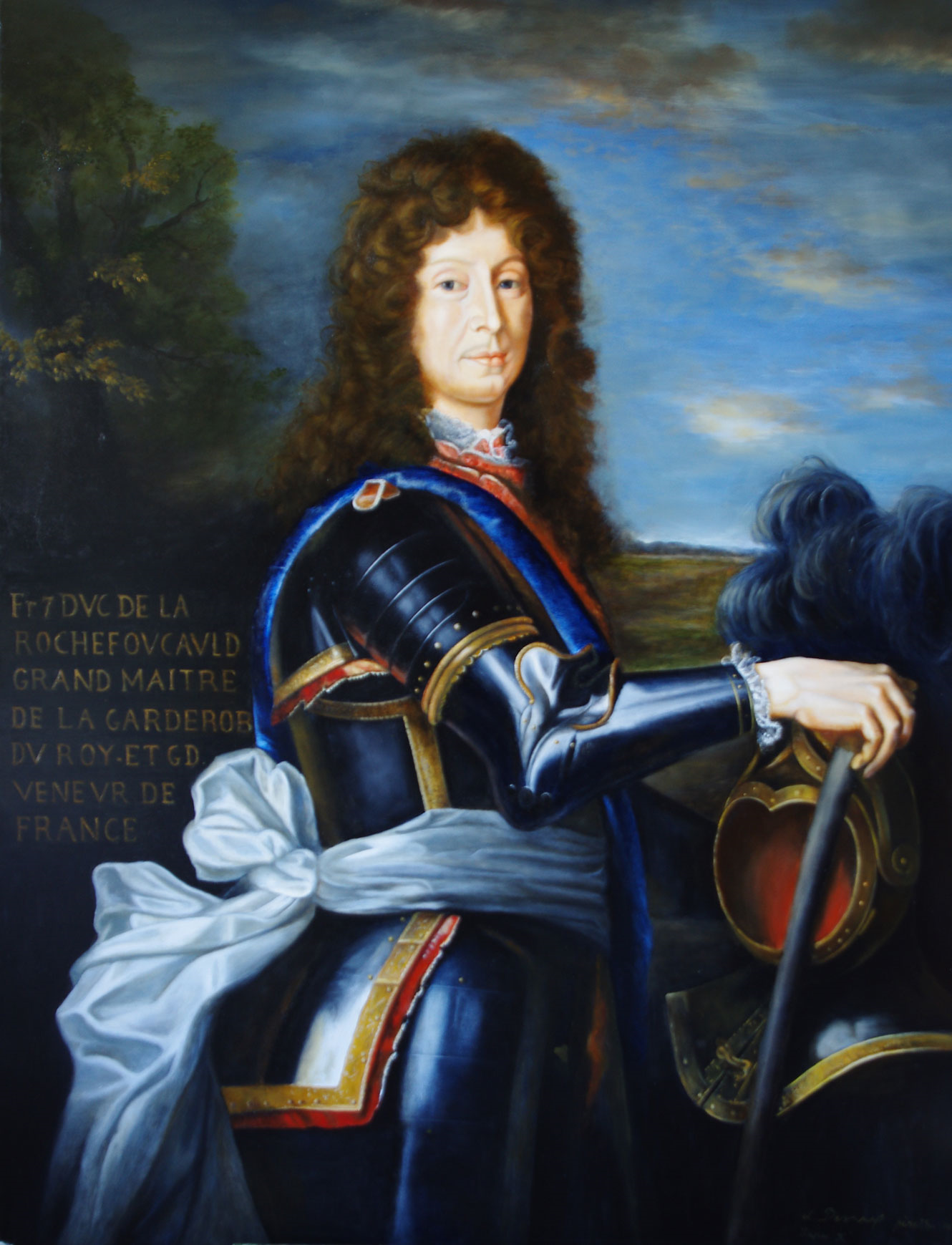
François VII of La Rochefoucauld (1634–1714) (1683).

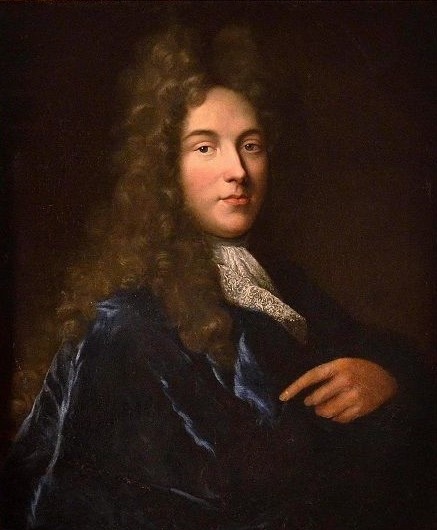
François VIII of La Rochefoucauld (1663–1728)

=== Roye branch ===
This branch was founded by Charles de La Rochefoucauld (1560–1605) Lord of Roye, Count of Roucy, younger son of François III of La Rochefoucauld (1521–1572), Count of La Rochefoucauld, and Charlotte of Roye (1537–1572) (Wikidata – Wikidata Q60321119), Countess of Roucy, who sister married Condé. This branch through different unions are descendants of a sister of King Francis 1st, William the 1st of Orange-Nassau, the chancelor Séguier, the Maréchal of Aloigny and Madame de Sablé and parents of Turenne (descendants of two of his sisters).

==== Dukes of Enville (1732), then Duke of La Rochefoucauld (1762) ====
Jean-Baptiste Louis Frédéric of La Rochefoucauld of Roye (1707–1746), Marquis of Roucy, created Duke of Enville (Note: Also known as Duke of Anville (French: Duc d'Anville)) upon his 1732 marriage to his cousin, Marie Louise Nicole Elisabeth of La Rochefoucauld (1716–1797), eldest daughter of Alexandre, the last Duke of La Rochefoucauld. As Alexandre had no surviving male heir, by letters patent of Louis XV, the title Duke of La Rochefoucauld was transmitted to the male issue of Marie Louise Nicole Elisabeth on the condition that she married a member of the La Rochefoucauld family.

1. Louis-Alexandre of La Rochefoucauld (son of preceding) (1743–1792), 6th Duke of La Rochefoucauld upon the death of his maternal grandfather in 1762 and 2nd Duke of Enville upon the death of his father in 1746. He was known as Duke of La Rochefoucauld-Enville. Member of the Académie des sciences, member of the Assembly of notables in 1787, deputy of the nobility at the French States-General of 1789. He was assassinated during the September massacres in Gisors; married (1) Pauline de Gand de Mérode in 1762, (2) Alexandrine Charlotte de Rohan-Chabot in 1780. As he died without heir, the title passed to his first cousin.

==== Dukes of Estissac (1737), Dukes of Liancourt (1765), then Dukes of La Rochefoucauld (1792 - confirmed at the restauration) and Duke of Anville (courtesy nowadays) ====
Louis François Armand of La Rochefoucauld (1695–1783) (Wikidata – Wikidata Q108941733) of the younger branch of Roye, count of Roye, count of Roucy and count of Blanzac, created Duke of Estissac upon his 1737 marriage to his cousin, Marie-Elisabeth of La Rochefoucauld (1718–1789) (Wikidata – Wikidata Q94759847), youngest daughter of Alexandre, the last Duke of La Rochfoucauld.

1. François XII of La Rochefoucauld (Frans Alexander Frederik; 1747–1827) (son of preceding), 7th Duke of La Rochefoucauld, created 1st Duke of Liancourt in 1765, 2nd duke of Estissac, and inherited the Duke of La Rochefoucauld title from his cousin in 1792; (Note: François Alexandre Frédéric was the one who, on 12 July 1789, responded to Louis XVI who asked "It is a revolt?" [C'est une révolte ?] ... "No, Sire, it's a Revolution" [Non, Sire, c'est une révolution]. He was in the liberal opposition party during the Bourbon Restoration.) married Félicité-Sophie of Lannion in 1764.
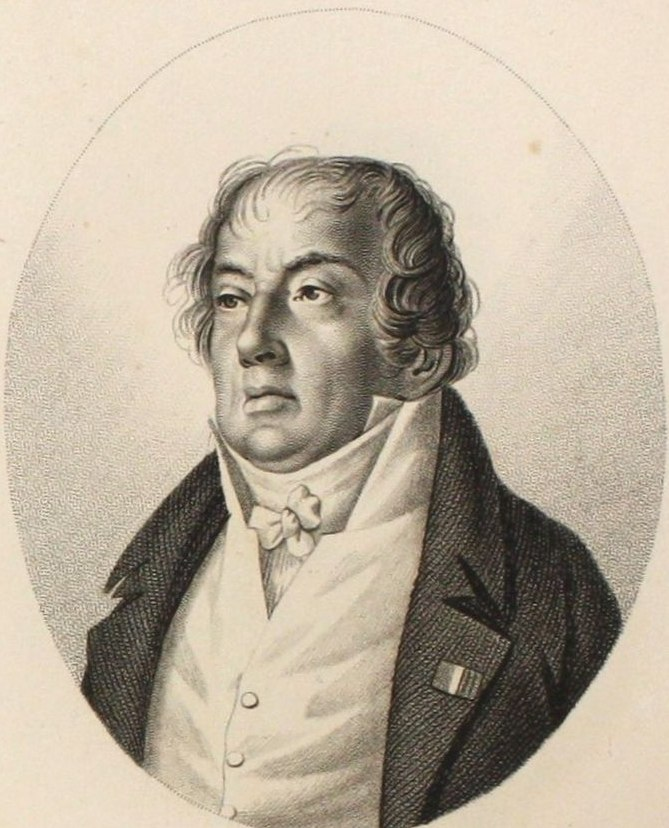
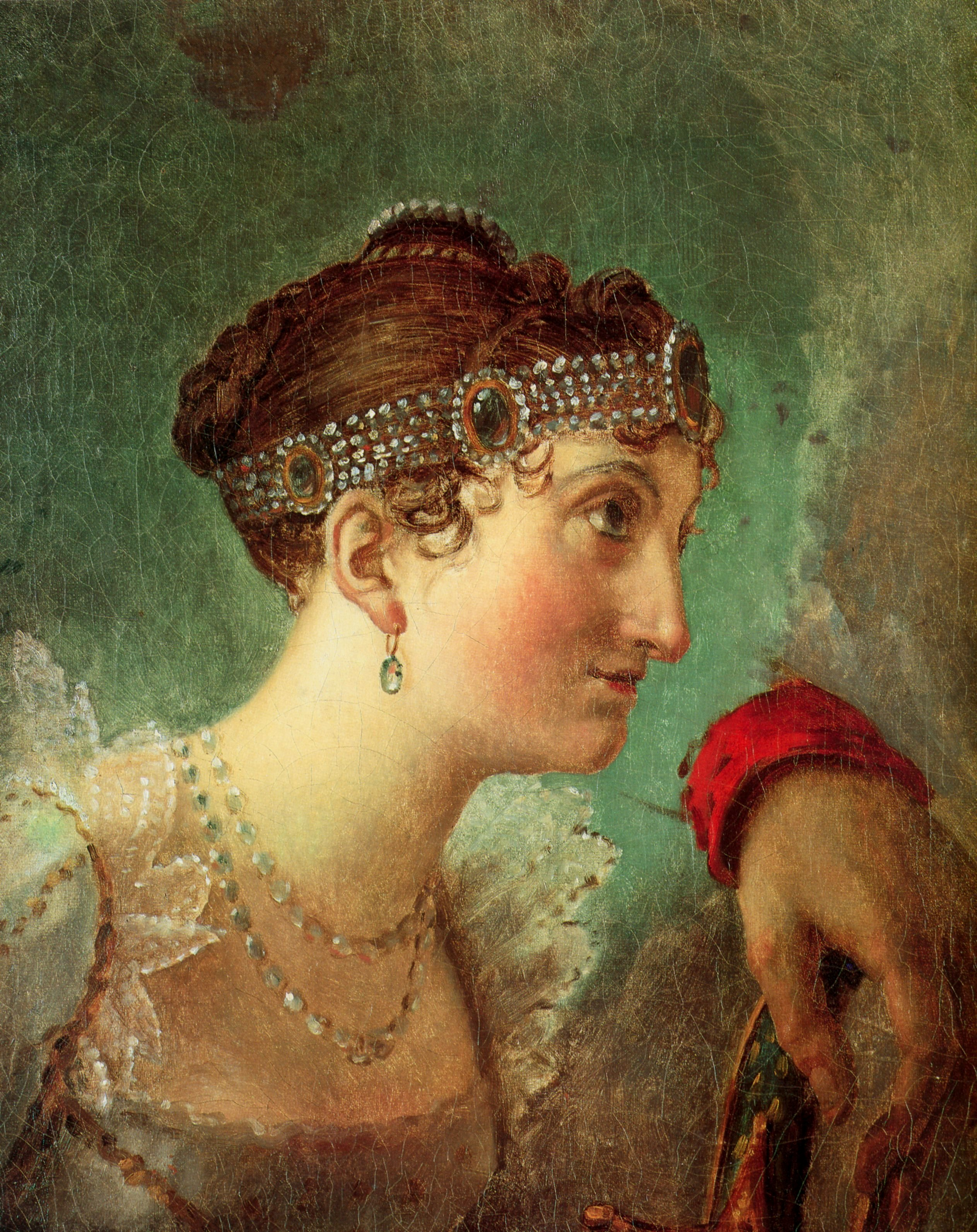
2. François XIII of La Rochefoucauld (né François Armand Fréderic of La Rochefoucauld; 1765–1848) (son of preceding), 8th Duke of La Rochefoucauld, Duke of Estissac, then Duke of Liancourt (in 1828, he was authorized to substitute the title of Duke of Liancourt for that of Duke of Estissac and gave his brother Alexandre, the title of Duke of Estissac, who thus founded the Estissac branch); (Note: One of François XIII's two younger brothers, Alexandre-François of La Rochefoucauld (family surname) (1767–1841), of Liancourt (father's origin), 1st Count of La Rochefoucauld (his title) (see top-right portrait), married Adélaide Marie Françoise of Pyvart (family surname) of Chastullé (father's origin) (1769–1814) (see left portrait), a San Domingo (modern-day Haiti) heiress associated with the Beauharnais family. She became dame d'honneur to the Empress Josephine (1763–1814).)
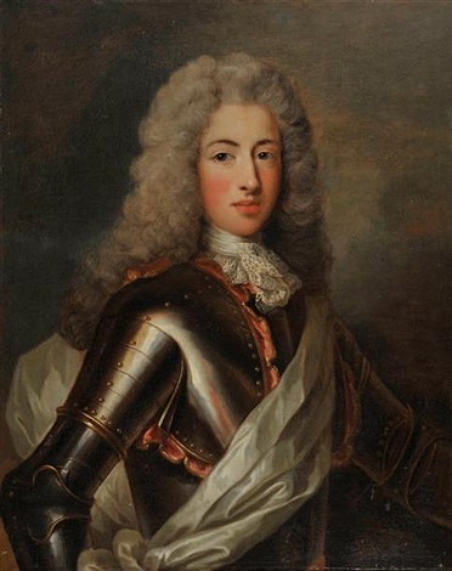
Jean-Baptiste Louis Frédéric of La Rochefoucauld (1707–1746). Hyacinthe Rigaud (1659–1743), artist.

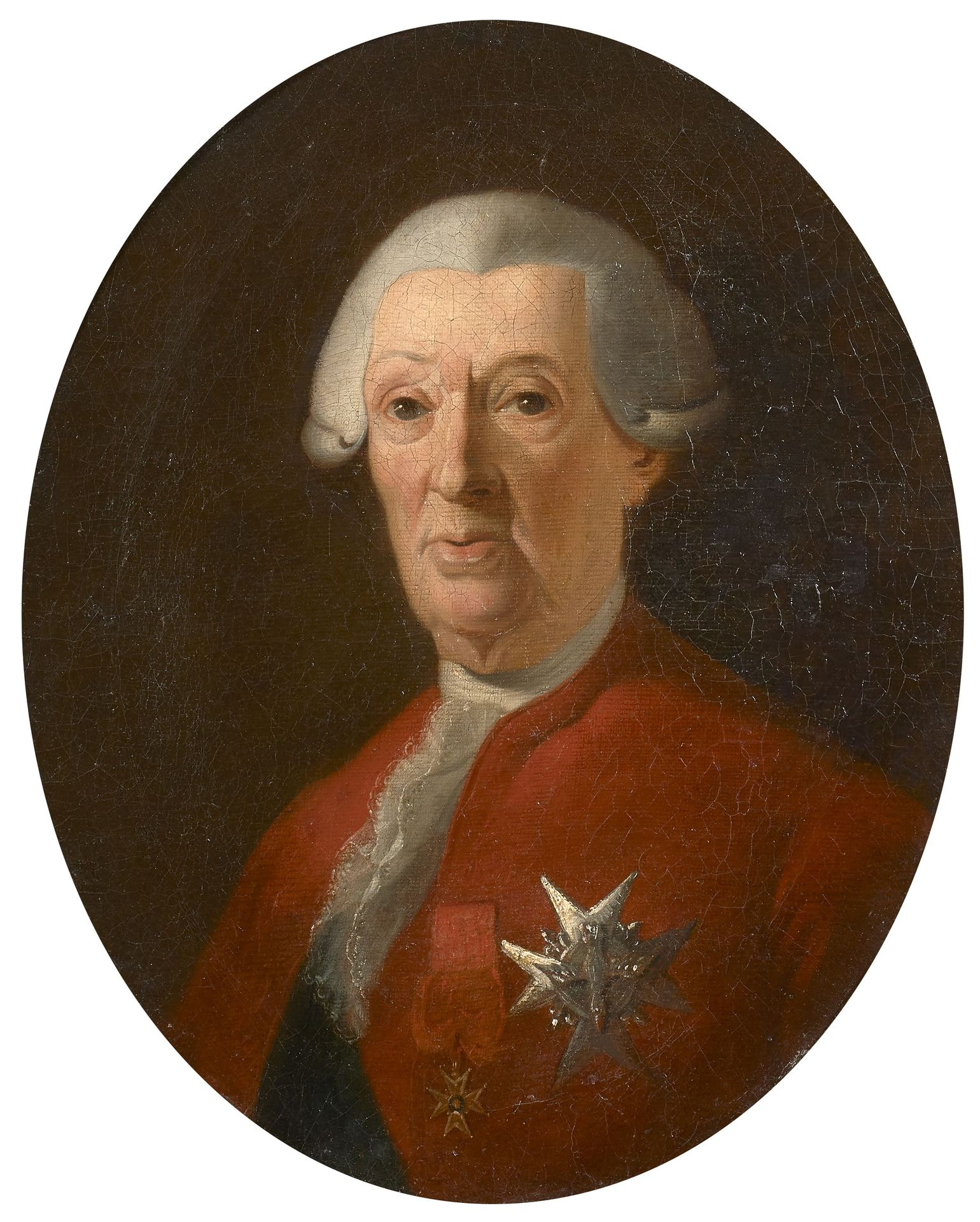
Louis-François Armand of La Rochefoucauld (1695-1783) of Roye, Duke of Estissac.

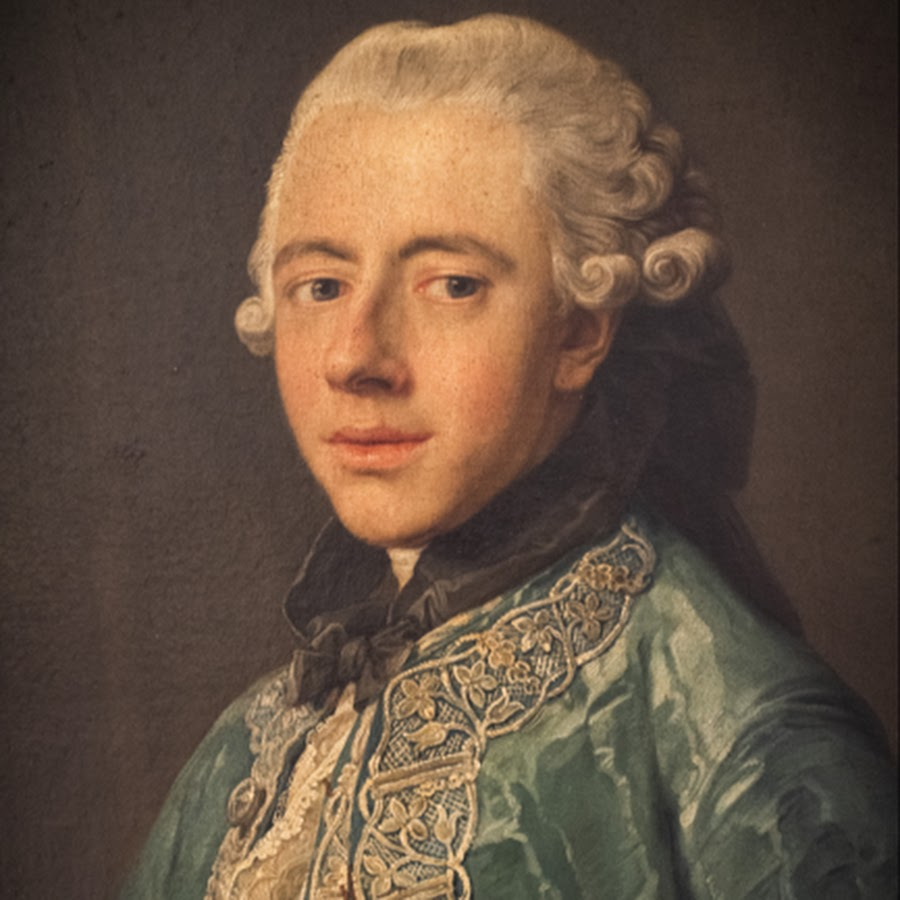
Louis Alexandre of La Rochefoucauld (1743–1792).

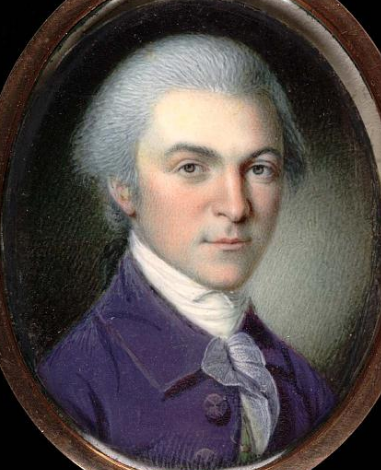
François Alexandre Frédéric of La Rochefoucauld (1747–1827). Charles Willson Peale (1741–1827), artist (c. 1794–1797).

Alexandre-François married Adélaïde Pyvart de Chastullé, cousin of Joséphine de Beauharnais, she was first lady of the empress and we can see in the coronation painting of Napoléon, holding the gown of Joséphine. Their daughter Adèle Marie Hortense Françoise of Rochefoucauld (1793–1877) (Wikidata – Wikidata Q109011231), married François Francesco Paolo Borghèse (1776–1839) – a brother-in-law of Pauline Marie Bonaparte (1780–1825). Pauline, a sister of Napoleon Bonaparte, became Princess Borghese through her marriage to Camillo Filippo Ludovico Borghese (1775–1832), Prince of Sulmona and Duke of Guastalla.

Alexandre-François served as the French Ambassador to Vienna (in Austria) (1805) and later to The Hague (fr) (in the Kingdom of Holland) (1808–1810), where he negotiated the union of the Kingdom of Holland with France. During the "Hundred Days", Napoleon appointed him as a peer of France, a prestigious title that granted him a seat in the Chamber of Peers, a legislative body composed of individuals chosen by the ruler (Napoleon) for their loyalty, influence, or status. He subsequently devoted himself to philanthropic work. In 1822, he became a deputy to the Chamber of Deputies and aligned himself with the constitutional royalists. He was again raised to the peerage in 1831.

Alexandre-François's descendants became Dukes of Estissac and Princes of La Rochefoucauld-Montbel. His other brother, the youngest of three siblings, Frédéric Gaëtan (1779–1863), became Marquis of La Rochefoucauld-Liancourt, and, in 1793, married to Marie-Françoise de Tott.

3. François XIV of La Rochefoucauld (né François Marie Auguste Armand of La Rochefoucauld; 1794–1874) (son of preceding), 9th Duke of La Rochefoucauld, in 1817, married to Zénaide Chapt of Rastignac (1798–1875) (Wikidata – Wikidata Q108941741 and Wikidata Q117088508). (Note: Alfred de La Rochefoucauld (1819–1883), Duke of La Roche-Guyon — the second son of François XIV de La Rochefoucauld (1794–1874) and Zénaide Chapt de Rastignac (1798–1875) — was the first male born in the lineage that would become the cadet branch of the La Rochefoucauld–La Roche-Guyon family.)
4. François XV of La Rochefoucauld (né François Augustin Ernest Marie; 1818–1879) (son of preceding), 10th Duke of La Rochefoucauld, in 1852, married Radegonde-Euphrasie Bouvery (1832–1901) (Wikidata – Wikidata Q108941741).
5. François XVI of La Rochefoucauld (né François Alfred Gaston of La Rochefoucauld; 1853–1925) (son of preceding), 11th Duke of La Rochefoucauld, in 1892, married Mattie-Elizabeth Mitchell (1866–1933) (Wikidata – Wikidata Q105696865) (daughter of U.S. Senator John H. Mitchell). (Note: Their son, François XVII Marie-Alfred de La Rochefoucauld (1905–1909), died young and was interred in the chapel of château.)
6. Alfred Gabriel Marie François of La Rochefoucauld (né Alfred Gabriel Marie François; 1854–1926) (Wikidata – Wikidata Q109011978) (brother of preceding), 12th Duke of La Rochefoucauld, the ducal title was transferred to him, in 1884, married Pauline Louise Marie Anne Albenais Fortunee Piscalory of Vaufreland (1864–1934).
7. Jean François Marie of La Rochefoucauld (1887–1970) (son of preceding), 13th Duke of La Rochefoucauld, 8th Duke of Liancourt, Prince of Marcillac, Duke of Anville (courtesy) in 1917, married Edmée Frish of Fels (1896–1991).
8. François XVIII of La Rochefoucauld (né François Marie Edmond Hubert of La Rochefoucauld; 1920–2011) (son of preceding), 14th Duke of La Rochefoucauld, 9th Duke of Liancourt, Prince of Marcillac, Duke of Anville (courtesy), (i) in 1946, married Marie-Louise Lucienne Meriaux (Jeannine Renée Petit; 1907–1995) (divorced in 1948), (ii) in 1950, married Sonia Marie Matossian (born 1931) (Wikidata – Wikidata Q131554175) (divorced in 1961), and (iii) in 1967, married Jeanne-Marie Ruth Dorothée Églantine of Villiers of Terrage (1921–2004). Jeanne-Marie was a great-great granddaughter of Édouard de Villiers du Terrage (1780–1855). François XVIII was a composer and violinist. He had been a violin student of Carmen Forté (1886–1964) at the Paris Conservatory.
  1. Solange Fasquelle (née Solange Marie Andrée of La Rochefoucauld; 1933–2016), a writer of novels, was the younger sister of François XVIII and wife (married 1954) of publisher Jean-Claude Fasquelle (1930–2021) (divorced 2000).
9. François XIX of La Rochefoucauld (François-Alexandre Marie Joseph of La Rochefoucauld; born 1958) (son of preceding and his 2nd wife, Sonia Marie Matossian), 15th Duke of La Rochefoucauld, 10th Duke of Liancourt, Duke of Anville (courtesy), Prince of Marcillac, in 1984, married Michèle Suzanne Etter (born 1948), who was previously married to Philippe Paul Michel Augier (born 1949).
10. François XX of La Rochefoucauld (François-Xavier of La Rochefoucauld; born 1986) (son of preceding), 11th Duke of Liancourt, Prince of Marcillac, duc d'Anville (courtesy), heir to the ducal title of La Rochefoucauld and house chief seat. On 29 June 2024, he married Inga Grigorenko (maiden), born in Tallinn, Estonia.
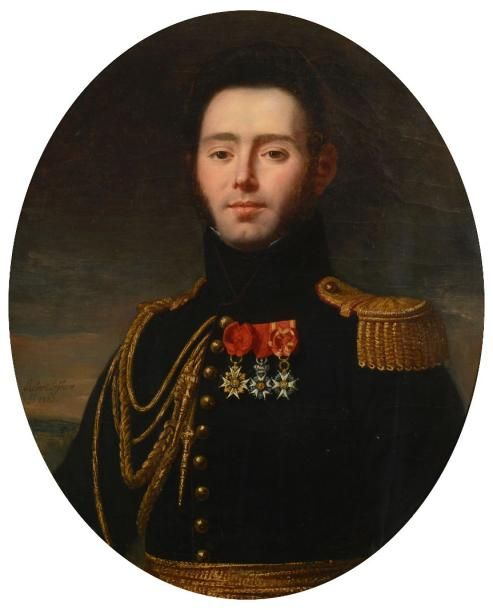
François XIV of La Rochefoucauld (1794-1874). Robert Lefèvre (1755–1830), artist.

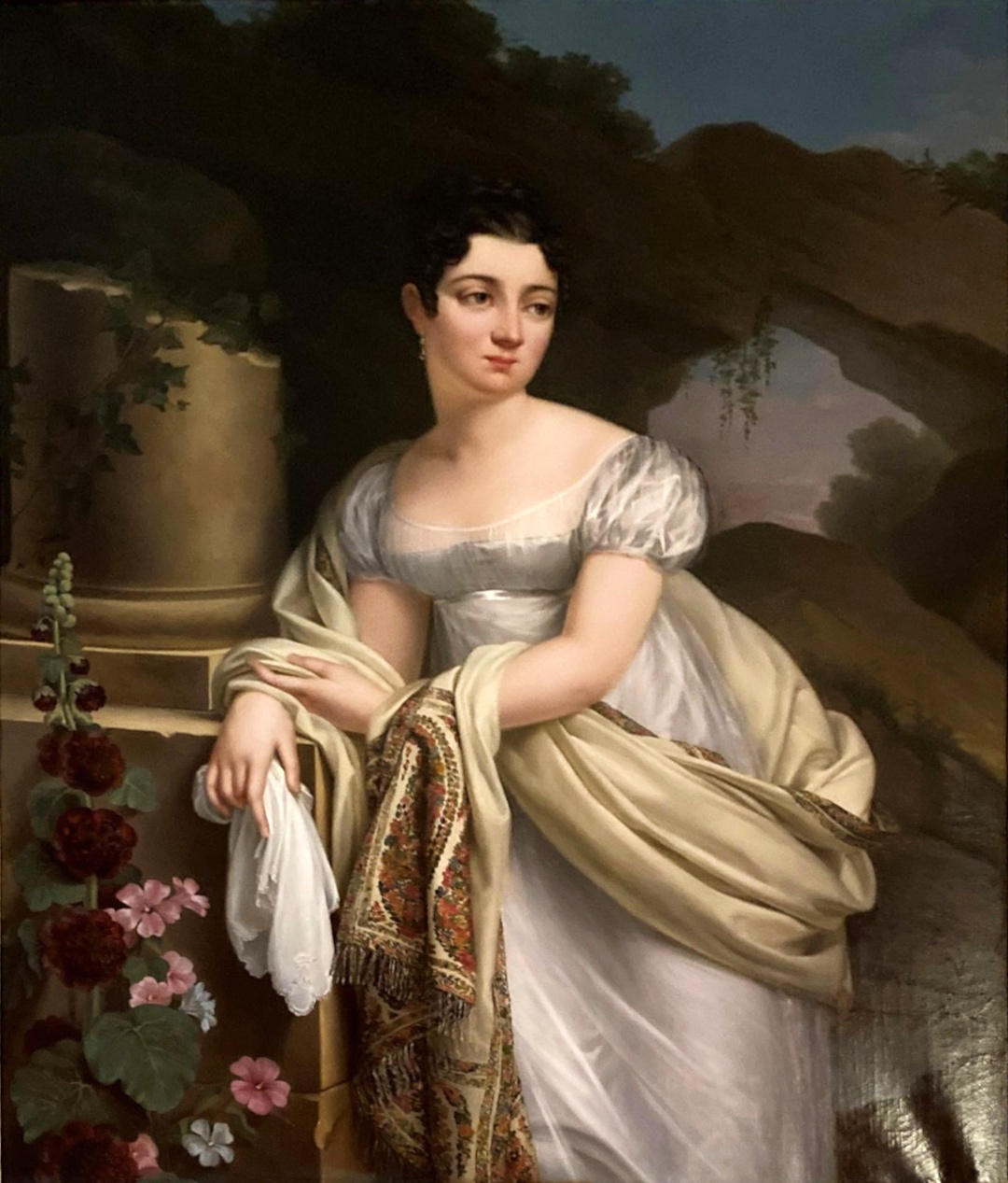
Zénaide Chapt de Rastignac. Edmée Brucy (1795–1826), artist.

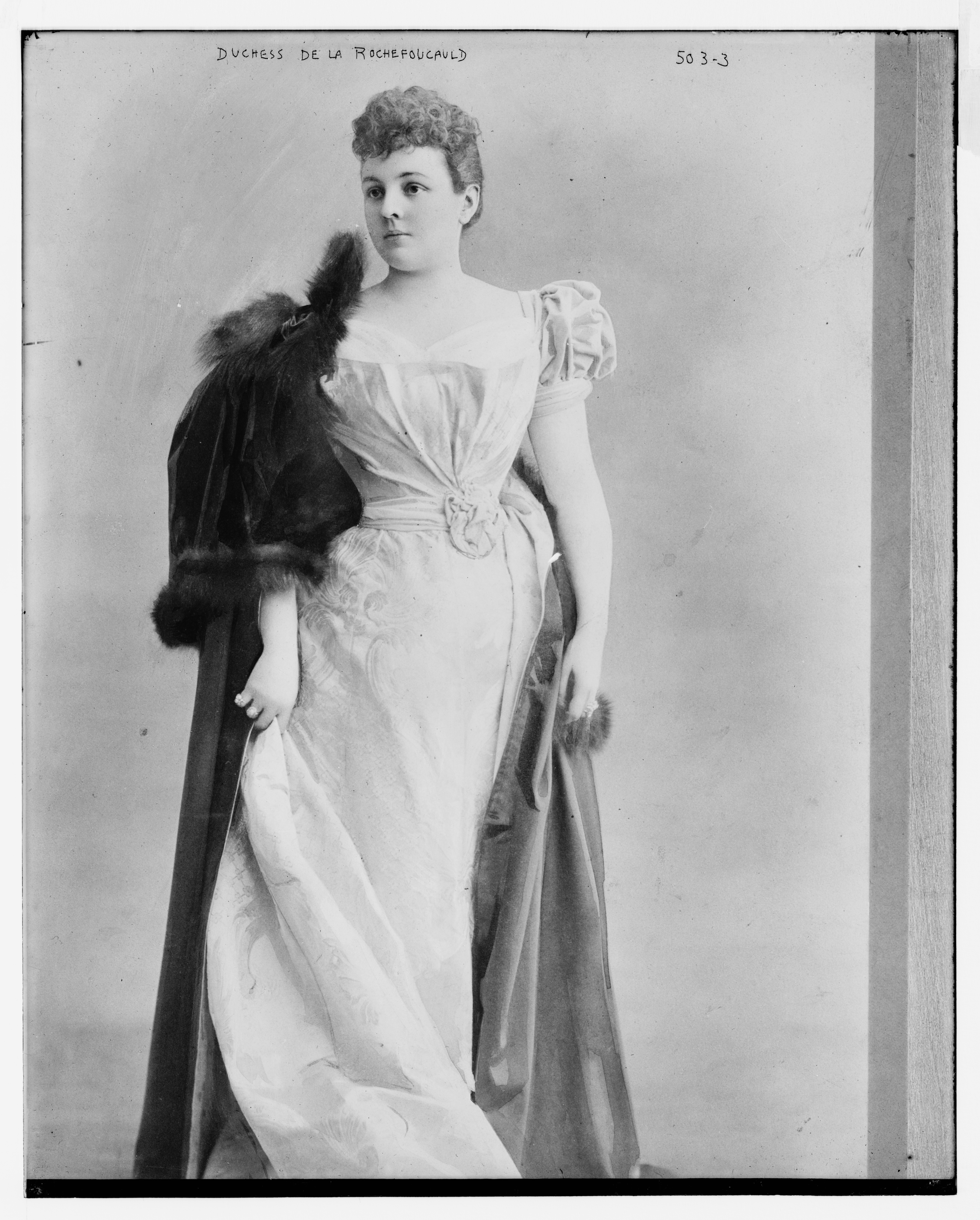
Duchesse Mattie-Elizabeth of la Rochefoucauld (née Mattie Elizabeth Mitchell; 1866–1933).

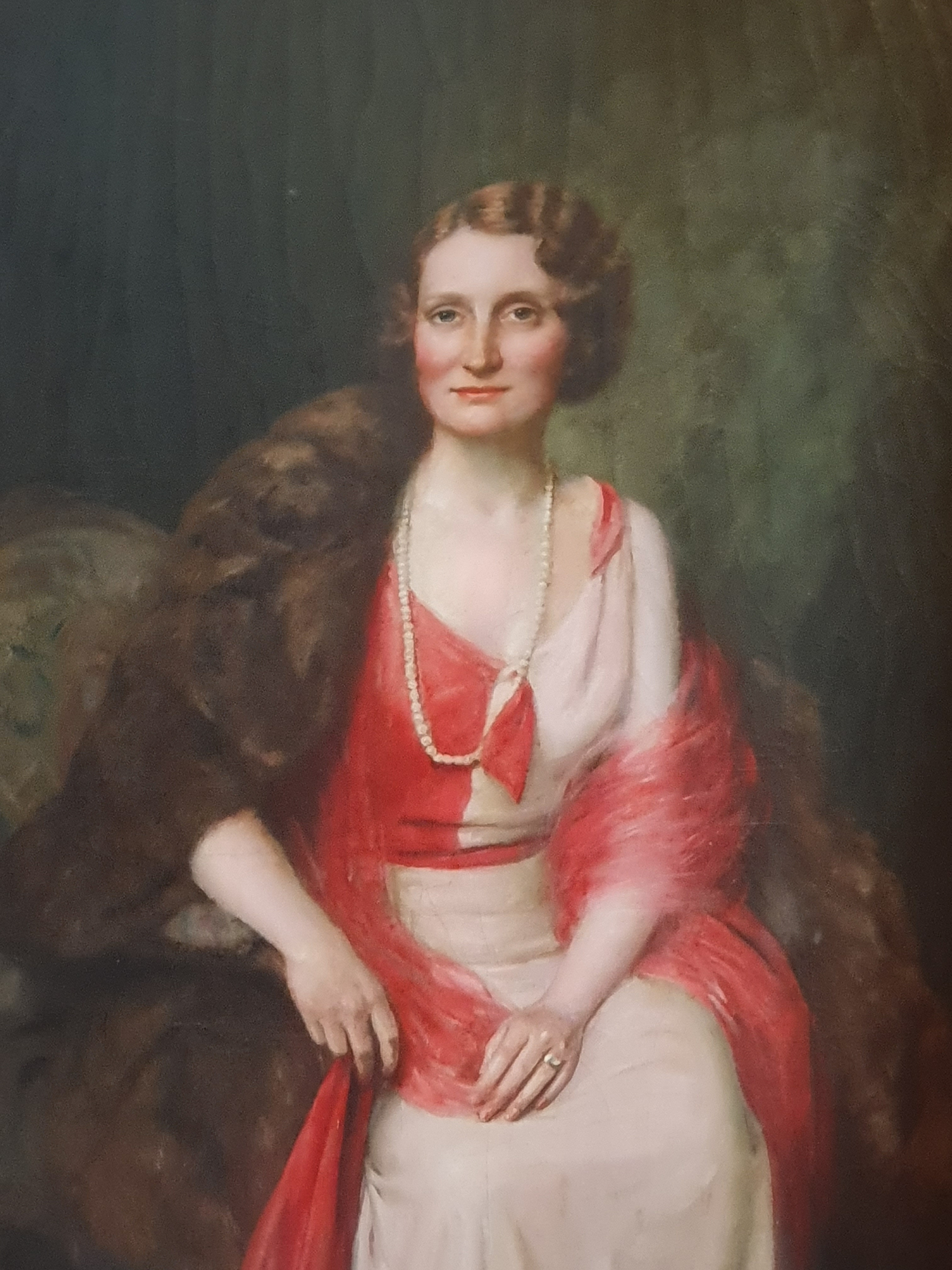
Duchesse Edmée of La Rochefoucauld (1896–1991).

== Dukes of Estissac (since 1839) ==
This branch comes from the younger branch of the Counts of Roye. Louis François Armand de la Rochefoucauld Count of Roye and of Roucy and of Blanzac, was created Duke with a patent (non-hereditary) in 1737, hereditary on 1758, and called Duke of Estissac. His grandson, Alexandre François de la Rochefoucauld (1761–1841), Count of the Empire, Ambassador for the Emperor, and brother of the Duke of La Rochefoucauld (of the Restoration) received the Duchy of Estissac from his elder brother in May 1839. His son, Alexandre Jules de La Rochefoucauld (1796–1856), was authorized by royal decree of 2 July 1840 to take the title of Duke of Estissac, however, this order was not followed by letters patent.

1. Alexandre Jules of La Rochefoucauld (1796–1856) (Wikidata – Wikidata Q2833774), Duke of Estissac in 1840. Officer of the Legion of Honour; married in 1822 to Hélène-Charlotte Pauline of Solles (1803–1864) (Wikidata – Wikidata Q116186431) (daughter of Jean Joseph of Solles, 1st Marquis Desolles).
2. Roger Paul Alexandre Louis of La Rochefoucauld (1826–1889) (son of preceding), Duke of Estissac; married to Juliette de Ségur in 1858.
3. Alexandre Jules Paul Philippe François of La Rochefoucauld (1854–1930) (son of preceding), Duke of Estissac; married to Jeanne de Rochechouart-Mortemart in 1883.
4. Louis François Alexandre of La Rochefoucauld (1885–1950) (son of preceding), Duke of Estissac; married to Nathalie de Clermont-Tonnerre in 1911.
5. Alexandre Louis Marie François of La Rochefoucauld (1917–2008) (son of preceding), Duke of Estissac, President of the Jockey Club; married to Antoinette de Moustier in 1943.
6. Pierre-Louis François Léonel Alexandre of La Rochefoucauld (born 1947) (son of preceding), Count of La Rochefoucauld and 7th Duke of Estissac, in 1980, married Sabine Henriette Marie Bernadette Françoise of La Rochefoucauld (born 1958).
7. Alexandre of La Rochefoucauld (born 1984), count of, heir to the duke of Estissac title.

Bernard de La Rochefoucauld (1922–2017), co-founder of the La Boétie Institute, former honorary president of the Institut Montaigne and former mayor of Ingrannes comes from this branch.

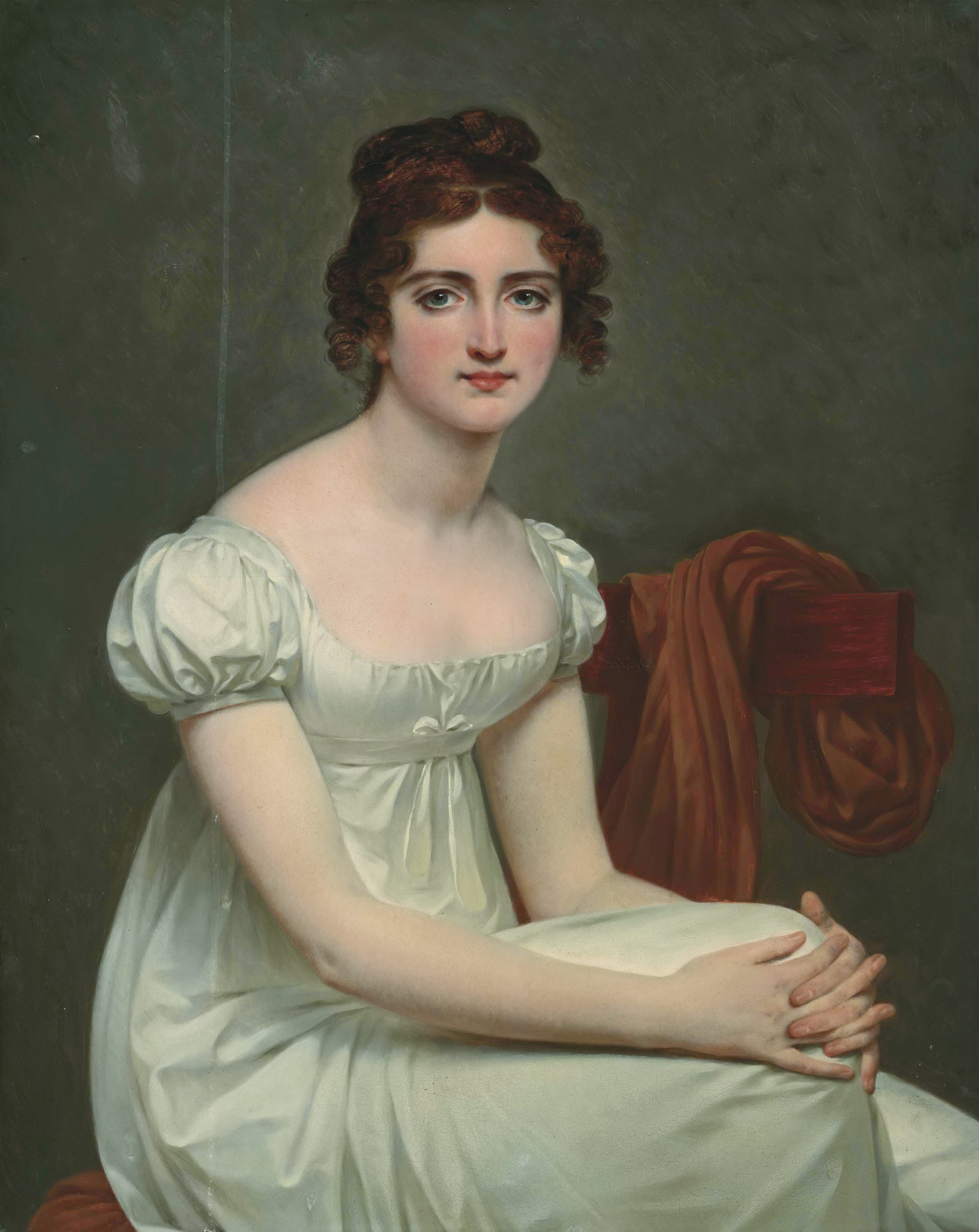
Hélène Charlotte Pauline of Solles (1803–1864). Antoine-Jean Gros (1771–1835), artist.

== Branch La Rochefoucauld-Montbel, counts de La Rochefoucauld and princes (Bavaria 1909) ==
1. François August Ernest Marie (Arthur) of La Rochefoucauld (1831–1888) (Wikidata – Wikidata Q109011996), mayor of Pellevoisin — second son of Alexandre Jules of La Rochefoucauld (1796–1856), Duke of Estissac and Hélène Charlotte Pauline of Dessolles (1803–1864) — married in 1854 Marie-Luce of Montbel (1835–1920), grand-daughter of Louis-Joseph of Montbel, Officer of the Legion of Honour, field marshal, Premier Chambellan for Charles X. Marie-Luce was linked with the building of the Shrine of Our Lady of Pellevoisin (Nihil obstat in 2024). She funded the covent of the dominicans there and became a tertiary nun under the name of Catherine of Sienna.
2. Jules of La Rochefoucauld-Montbel (1857–1945) (Wikidata – Wikidata Q109011995) Count of La Rochefoucauld, Mayor of Pellevoisin, received in Bavaria on 22 July 1909 from Ludwig III of Bavaria the title of Fürst (Prince). · He was authorized 22 March 1922 to add his mother's name to his name. Thus the branch of La Rochefoucauld-Montbel (cadets of the dukes of Estissac). He married in 1881 Jeanne Louise Marie Nathalie Lebeuf of Montgermont.
Note: Aimery count de La Rochefoucauld (1843–1928), received also the Bavarian Prince title on the same date. His only son Gabriel II (né Gabriel Marie François Hippolyte Ferri Eugène of La Rochefoucauld; 1875–1942) (Wikidata – Wikidata Q19357508), writer and great friend of Marcel Proust (1871–1922), married to Odile Marie Auguste Septimanie Chapelle of Jumilhac (1879–1974) — daughter of Armand Marie Odet Richard of Chapelle of Jumilhac (1847–1880), 7th Duke of Richelieu and American-born Marie Alice Heine (1857–1925) — had one child, Anne Alice Élisabeth Amélie of La Rochefoucauld (1906–1980) (Wikidata – Wikidata Q20653642) founded in 1952 of the association Old French Houses. Anne was a godmother of Dominique of La Rochefoucauld-Montbel. Anne's second husband (married in 1948), John Julius of Amodio (aka Jules François Joseph Juan Philippe Maurice Fernando of Amodio; 1909–2003), was Marquise of Amodio.
3. Emmanuel Arthur Adrien Joseph Marie of La Rochefoucauld-Montbel (1883–1974), Count of La Rochefoucauld, Prince in Bavaria, Ambassador, Commander of the Legion of Honour, Bailiff Grand Cross of Honor and Devotion of the Sovereign Military Order of Malta, married in 1913 Simone of Darblay. They owned the Lascaux caves.
4. Charles-Emmanuel (Charles-Emmanuel Jules Aymé Marie of La Rochefoucauld-Montbel; 1914–2000), Count of La Rochefoucauld, Prince in Bavaria; married (i) in 1943, Flora d'Huart Saint-Mauris (1925–1995) (Wikidata – Wikidata Q75390875) (divorced); and (ii) in June 1949, Joanna-Isabelle Forbes (1918–1998) (with descendants). He donated the Lascaux cave to France and the lands and buildings of the Pellevoisin sanctuary to the diocese of Bourges. Including :
  1. Guy-Emmanuel Jean Marie Joseph of La Rochefoucauld-Montbel (1944–1991) who, in 1973, married Éléonore Edmond-Blanc. Without descendants.
  2. Dominique Louis Gabriel of La Rochefoucauld-Montbel - See below
5. Dominique of La Rochefoucauld-Montbel (born 1950), Count of La Rochefoucauld, Prince in Bavaria, Officer of Légion d'honneur, Grand Cross of Order of Merit of the Italian Republic, Grand Cross of the Order of Isabella the Catholic and Grand Cross of the Order of St. Gregory the Great. In January 1984, he married Pascale Subtil. Member of the Sovereign Council and Grand Hospitaller of the Sovereign Order of Malta (elected 31 May 2014 [5-year term]; re-elected 2 May 2019 [term concluded May 2024]). Bailiff Grand Cross of Honor and Devotion of the Sovereign Military Order of Malta and Grand Cross of the Order pro Merito Melitensi. He was also President of the Association and Vice-President of Ordre de Malte France. He is still Vice-President of the fondation. He is Bailiff Grand Cross of Justice of the Sacred Military Constantinian Order of Saint George. In February 2025, he was part of the visit of the holy see nuncio to France Celestino Migliore to the sanctuary of Pellevoisin after the Vatican nihil obstat of the marial apparitions to Estelle Faguette.
6. Gabriel of La Rochefoucauld-Montbel (b. 1987), count of La Rochefoucauld, heir to the Prince in Bavaria title.

== Dukes of Roche-Guyon (1679–1762) ==
François VIII de La Rochefoucauld (1663–1728) was created Duke of La Roche-Guyon by letters of November 1679. The 1st Duchy-peerage of La Rochefoucauld and, the title of Duke of La Roche-Guyon, died out in 1762 with Alexandre, 5th Duke of La Rochefoucauld and 2nd Duke of La Roche-Guyon, who had only two daughters who married their cousins from the branch of the Counts of Roye and Roucy.

== Dukes of La Roche-Guyon (courtesy title) (19th–21st centuries) ==
Alfred de La Rochefoucauld (1819–1883), a cadet branch from the cadet branch of Roye, took over motu proprio in the 19th century, without letters of confirmation, the title of Duke of La Roche-Guyon, which had extinguished in 1762. This courtesy title of "Duke of La Roche-Guyon" has been borne by his descendants ever since.

1. Alfred Pierre Marie René of La Rochefoucauld (1819–1883), known as Duke of La Roche-Guyon (Wikidata – Wikidata Q108941731), in 1851, married Isabelle Camille Nivière (1833–1911) (Wikidata – Wikidata Q17501984), writer and poet, author of many poems published by Alphonse Lemerre, from 1877 until her death. Their second son – Antoine de La Rochefoucauld (1862–1959) – was a painter.
2. Pierre de La Rochefoucauld (1853–1930) (Wikidata – Wikidata Q108941730) (son of preceding), Duke of La Roche-Guyon, in 1888, married Gildippe Odoard of Hazey of Versainville (1867–1925) (Wikidata – Wikidata Q109012635). Their third son, Bernard Bernard of La Rochefoucauld (1901–1944), was a member of the French Resistance in Falaise and died in the Flossenbürg concentration camp in 1944.
3. Gilbert Camille Alfred Alexandre of La Rochefoucauld (1889–1964) (son of preceding), known as Duke of La Roche-Guyon, married (i) Princess Hélène Marie of La Trémoïlle (1899–1972) (Wikidata – Wikidata Q75307873) (divorced and annulled in 1927) and (ii) Marie-Louise Lerche (1899–1984) (Wikidata – Wikidata Q109012635) in 1927.
4. Alfred Henri Gaston of La Rochefoucauld (1928–2013) (son of preceding), known as Duke of La Roche-Guyon, in 1952, married Lydie Alix Marie-Thérèse Jacobé of Haut of Sigy (born 1932), paternal granddaughter of Pierre Jacobé of Haut of Sigy (1876–1960).
5. Guy-Antoine de La Rochefoucauld (born 1958) (son of preceding), known as Duke of La Roche-Guyon, married Yolaine Françoise Marie Leclerc de Hauteclocque (born 1961), paternal granddaughter of Philippe Leclerc de Hauteclocque (1902–1947).
6. Louis-Antoine de La Rochefoucauld (b. 1988), count of, heir to the duke of La Roche-Guyon title.

Count Bernard Gaston Mathieu Gilbert of La Rochefoucauld (1901–1944), the director Jean-Dominique Marie Henri of La Rochefoucauld-Guyon (1931–2011), along with daughters Sophie Nathalie Catherine Jeanne (born 1965) and Claire (born 1972) are descendants of this branch.

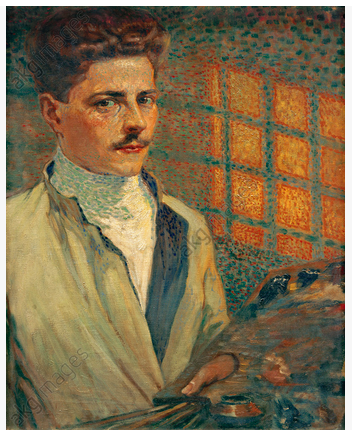
Antoine de La Rochefoucauld (1862–1959). Émile Schuffenecker (1851–1934), artist (c. 1886).

== Marquises of Montendre and Surgères ==
These branches were formed by Louis de La Rochefoucauld, Lord of Montendre, Montguyon, Roissac and des Salles, who was a younger son of François I de La Rochefoucauld (1450–1541), comte de La Rochefoucauld, by his second marriage to Barbe du Bois (a French name meaning "Barbara of the Woods"). He married Jacquette de Mortemer in 1534. His son was François de La Rochefoucauld (d. 1600), Lord of Montguyon, Baron of Montendre, who married Hélène de Goulard (only daughter and heiress of Egmond Goulard, Lord of Marsay). His son, Isaac de La Rochefoucauld (d. c. 1626), Lord of Montguyon, Baron of Montendre, married Hélène de Fonsèque (daughter of Charles de Fonsèque, Lord of Surgères) in 1600. Among others, they were the parents of Charles, progenitor of the Montendre branch and François, progenitor of the Surgères branch.

=== Marquis of Montendre ===
1. Charles of La Rochefoucauld, 1st Marquis of Montendre (son of Isaac); married to Renée Thévin in 1633.
  1. Charles-Louis of La Rochefoucauld, 2nd Marquis of Montendre; married to Anne de Pithou (daughter of Pierre de Pithou, Lord of Luyere).
    1. Isaac Charles of La Rochefoucauld (c. 1670–1702), Count of Montendre, fought in the Siege of Mainz, the Battle of Fleurus, the Siege of Mons, the Siege of Barcelona, the Battle of Cremona (where he was wounded), and the Battle of Luzzara, where, on 15 August 1702, he was killed. He had no issue.
    2. François of La Rochefoucauld (1672–1739) (Wikidata – Wikidata Q3086229), 3rd Marquis of Montendre; married to Marie-Anne von Spanheim (daughter of Baron Ezéchiel von Spanheim, Prussian Ambassador to England), no issue.
    3. Louis of La Rochefoucauld (circa 1669–1742), 4th Marquis of Montendre; married to Suzanne d'Argouges in 1710, no issue.
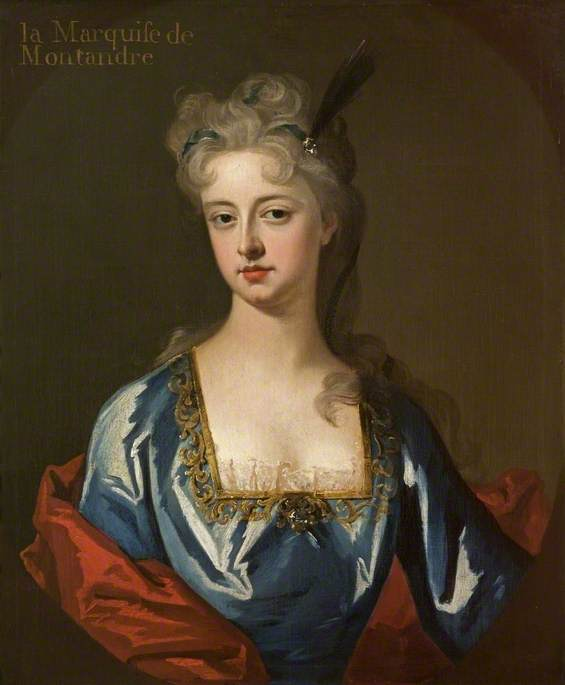
Mary Anne von Spanheim, wife of François of La Rochefoucauld, Marquis of Montandre. Michael Dahl, artist (c. 1659–1743) (c. 1720).

=== Marquis of Surgères ===
1. François de La Rochefoucauld (c. 1620–c. 1680), 1st Marquis of Surgères; married to Anne de Philippier
  1. Charles-François de La Rochefoucauld (c. 1643–c. 1714), 2nd Marquis of Surgères; married to Anne de La Rochefoucauld (daughter of Benjamin de La Rochefoucauld, Baron of Estissac) in 1662.
    1. François de La Rochefoucauld (1664–1731), 3rd Marquis of Surgères; married to Angélique Lee (widow of François Lucas de Démuin) in 1704.
      1. Alexandre-Nicolas de La Rochefoucauld (1709–1760), 4th Marquis of Surgères, Lieutenant General of the King's Armies; married to Jeanne-Thérèse Fleuriau de Morville (daughter of Charles-Jean-Baptiste Fleuriau de Morville) in 1728.
        1. Jean-François de La Rochefoucauld (1735–1789), 5th Marquis of Surgères, governor of Chartres; married to Anne Chauvelin de Grosbois, daughter of Germain Louis Chauvelin, Marquis of Grosbois) in 1752.

== Dukes of Doudeauville (1782–1995), of Bisaccia (1851–1995), and of Estrées (1892–1907) ==
The title Duke of Doudeauville (Duc de Doudeauville) was created for Ambroise-Polycarpe, 6th Marquis of Surgères (premier Baron of the Boulonnais), in 1780 by King Louis XVI in the Peerage of France. It was also created in 1782 by Charles III in the Kingdom of Spain (through his wife as heir to the title of Duke of Doudeauville of the Le Tellier de Courtanvaux family), granting him the Rank of Grandee of Spain, 1st Class. The title was recognized by the peerage ordinance of 4 June 1814; a Hereditary peer of France on 19 August 1815, Hereditary Duke-Peer on 31 August 1817 by King Louis XVIII during his 2nd reign. The title became extinct in 1995 upon the death of the 7th Duke. The Duke of Bisaccia (Duca di Bisaccia) title was created for Sosthènes II on 16 May 1851 by King Ferdinand II in the peerage of the Kingdom of the Two Sicilies (second creation; through his grandmother's family, the Montmorency-Lavals). Inscription among the Bavarian nobility as Princes under the title Duke of Bisaccia (Herzog von Bisaccia), on 24 November 1855 by King Maximilian II. It also became extinct in 1995. The designation of the title of Duke of Doudeauville was changed to Duke of Estrées in Spain in 1893 by King Alfonso XIII when it was transferred to Sosthènes II's second son, Charles, but became extinct upon the Duke's death, without male issue, in 1907.

1. Ambroise-Polycarpe of La Rochefoucauld (1765–1841) (son of 5th Marquis of Surgères), 1st Duke of Doudeauville, 6th Marquis of Surgères, Grandee of Spain (under the title Duke of Doudeauville); married to Bénigne Augustine Françoise Le Tellier (1764–1849), Lady of Montmirail (founder of the Religieuses de Nazareth in 1822).
  1. Sosthènes I of La Rochefoucauld (1785–1864), 2nd Duke of Doudeauville; married to Élisabeth de Montmorency-Laval (1790–1834) (a daughter of Minister of Foreign Affairs Duke Mathieu de Montmorency).
    1. Stanislas of La Rochefoucauld (1822–1887), 3rd Duke of Doudeauville; married to Marie de Colbert-Chabanais.
    2. Sosthènes II of La Rochefoucauld (1825–1908), 4th Duke of Doudeauville, 1st Duke of Bisaccia, on 6 April 1848, in Paris, married Yolande Justine Victoire Marie of Polignac (1830–1855) (Wikidata – Wikidata Q76275222) (daughter of Prime Minister Prince Jules de Polignac) and then, on 8 July 1862, in Beloeil, Belgium, married Marie Georgine Sophie Hedwige Eugenie of Ligne (1843–1898) (Wikidata – Wikidata Q76268690).
      1. Charles Marie François of La Rochefoucauld (1863–1907), Duke of Estrées (took the Spanish title, not recognized in France, by transfer); married to Princess Charlotte of La Trémoïlle (daughter of Prince Louis Charles de La Trémoille).
      2. Armand François Jules Marie of La Rochefoucauld (1870–1963) (Wikidata – Wikidata Q3837631), 5th Duke of Doudeauville, President of the Jockey-Club de Paris and the Polo de Paris; married to Princess Marié Lise Radziwill
        1. Sosthènes III of La Rochefoucauld (1897–1970), 6th Duke of Doudeauville, married Eleanor (Leonora) Lucía María Josepha (Josefa) Romula of Saavedra and of Collado (1900–1955) (Wikidata – Wikidata Q76275276), Countess of Torrehermosa of Viana and daughter of José of Saavedra (1870–1927), 2nd Marquess of Viana.
        2. Armand Charles François Marie of La Rochefoucauld (1902–1995) (Wikidata – Wikidata Q76275285), 7th Duke of Doudeauville, married Esther Millicent Clarke and had a natural son with Clémentine Elisabeth Brandt.
          1. Armand Sosthènes of La Rochefoucauld (born 1944); married to Geneviève Rose Blanche Fourny.
      3. Édouard François Marie of La Rochefoucauld (1874–1968), 2nd Duke of Bisaccia, on 19 June 1901, in Paris, married Camille Marie Françoise of Colbert-Chabanais (1883–1969).
        1. Marie-Carmen of La Rochefoucauld (1902–1999); married to Count of Mailly-Nesles in 1928.
        2. Stanislas of La Rochefoucauld (1903–1965), Count, in 1926, married Sophie Alice Cocea, and in 1947, married Princess Jeanne Princess of San Felice de Viggiano.
        3. Élisabeth of La Rochefoucauld (1909–2006), in 1929, married Elliot Robert Le Gras du Luart of Montsaulnin, and in 1958, married Mario Fausto Maria Pinci.
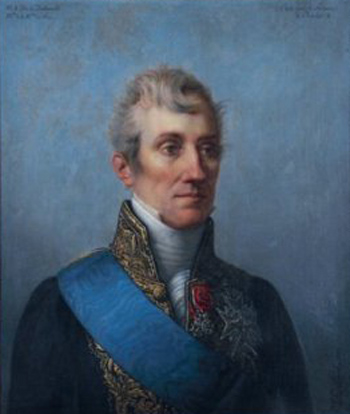
Ambroise-Polycarpe of La Rochefoucauld. Pierre Louis Delaval (1790–1881) (1827).

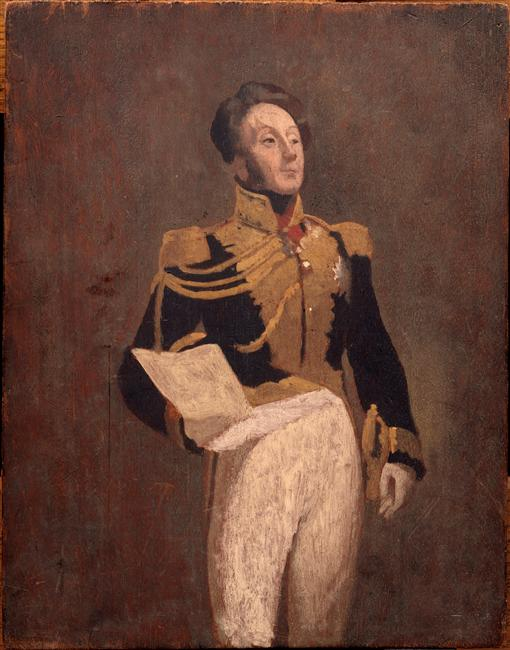
Sosthènes I of La Rochefoucauld (1785–1864). François Joseph Heim (1787–1865), artist.

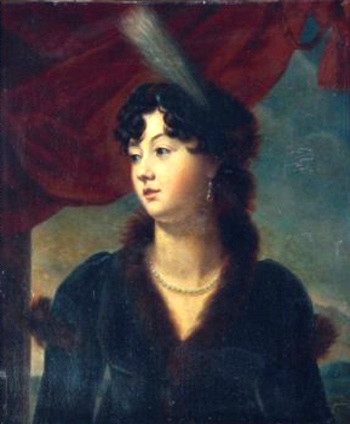
Elisabeth of Montmorency-Laval (1790-1834)

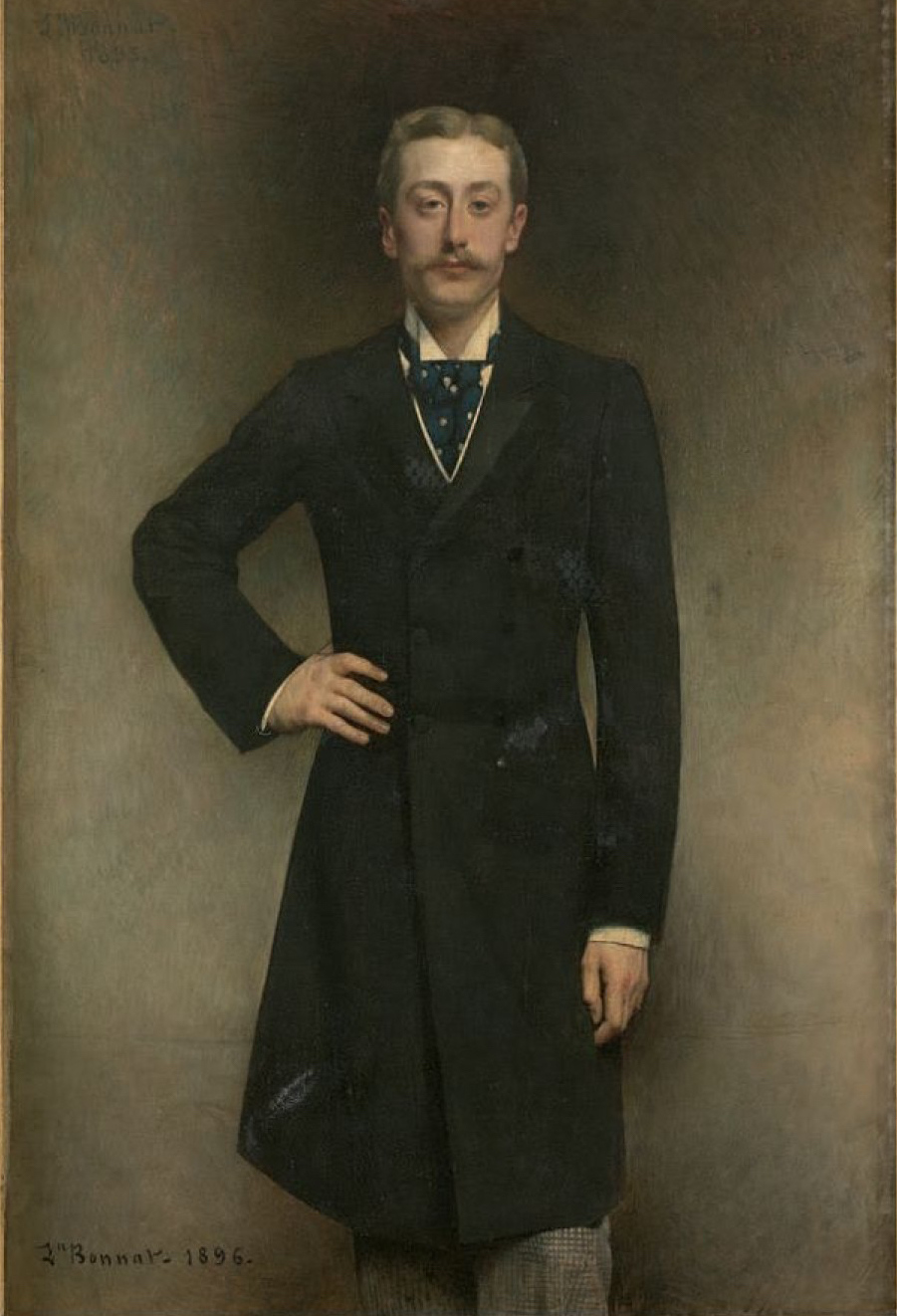
Armand François Jules Marie of La Rochefoucauld (1870–1963)

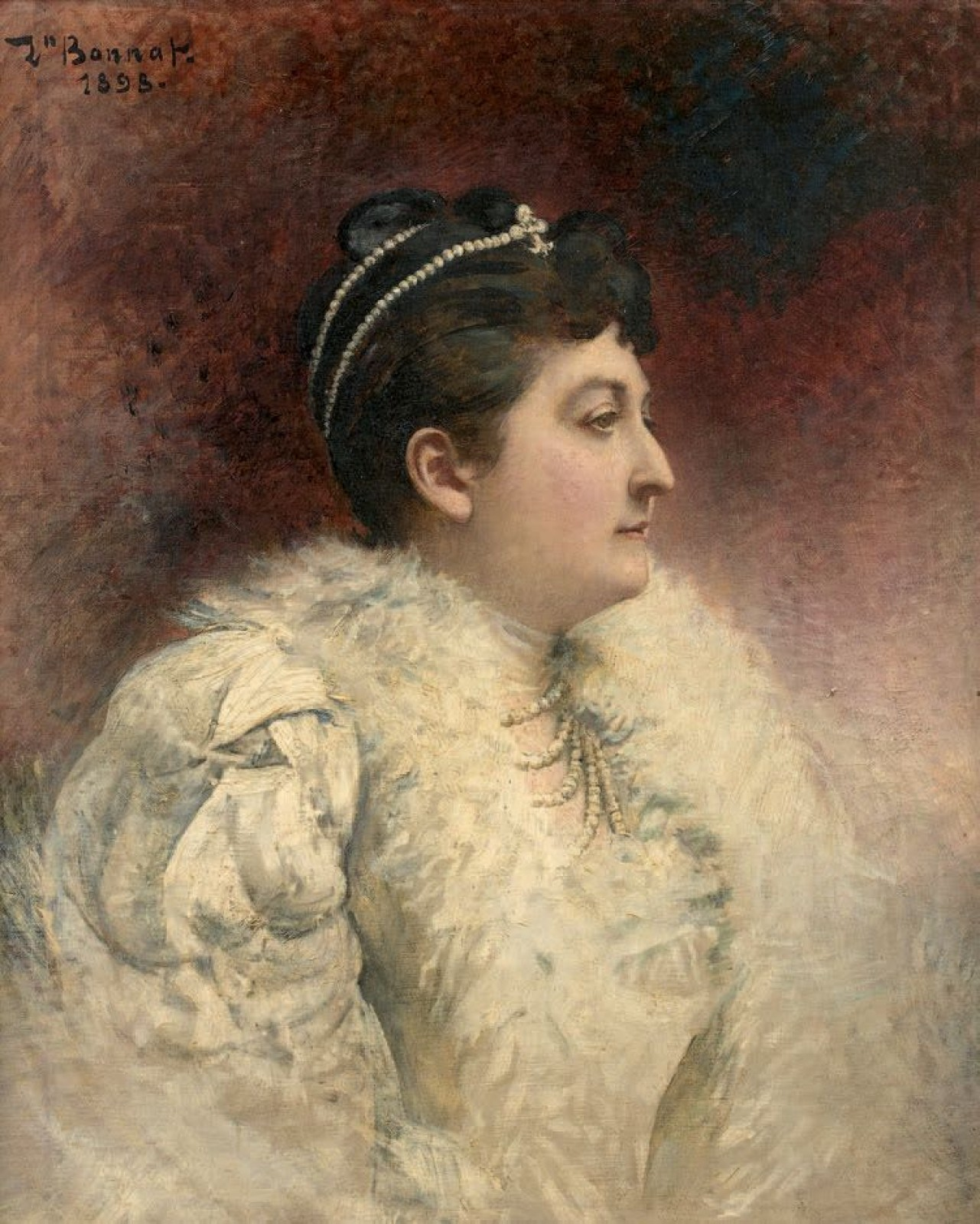
Marie Georgine Sophie Hedwige of Ligne (1843–1898). Léon Bonnat (1833–1922), artist.

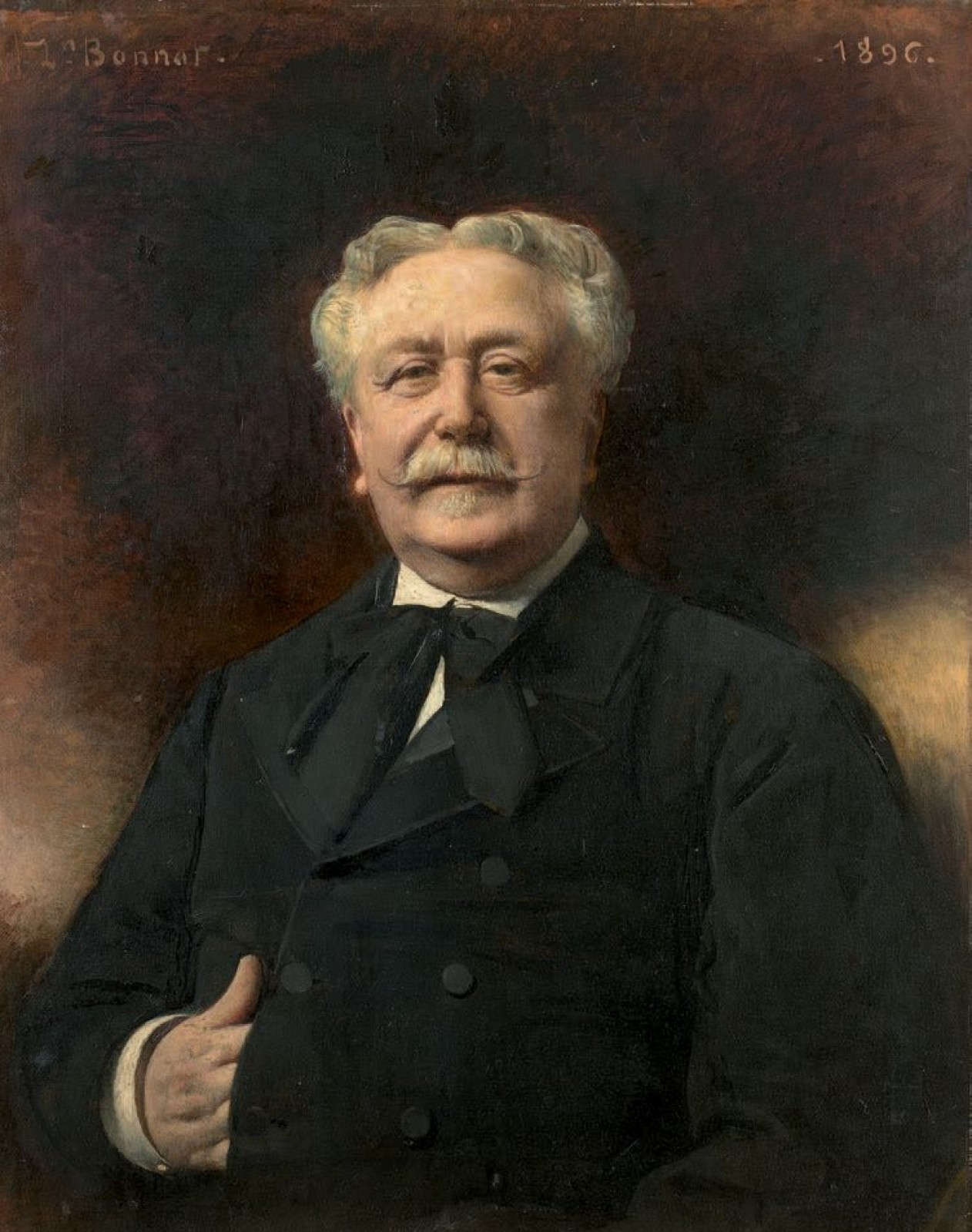
Sosthènes II of La Rochefoucauld. Léon Bonnat, (1833–1922), artist (1899).

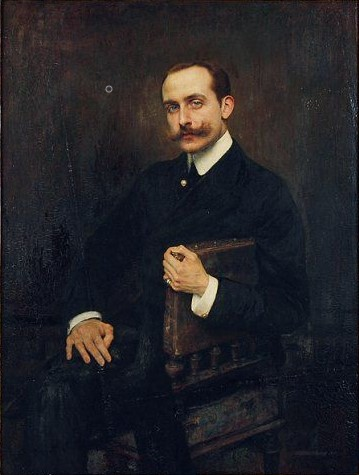
Édouard François Marie of La Rochefoucauld (1874–1968). Gabriel Ferrier (1847–1914), artist.

== Marquis of Bayers; Baron of La Rochefoucauld-Bayers (1817) ==
This branch was originated by Geoffroy de La Rochefoucauld, Lord of Verteuil (d. c. 1329) from whom descended Guillaume de La Rochefoucauld, Lord of Nouans (d. c. 1487). One of his sons, Guillaume de La Rochefoucauld (d. c. 1512) founded the branch by Bayers building the Château de Bayers becoming Lord of Bayers (Seigneur de Bayers). His descendant, Louis-Antoine de La Rochefoucauld-Bayers, obtained the title, Marquis of Bayers.

The male line of this branch became extinct in 1940 upon the death of Raoul-Gustave Marie de La Rochefoucauld, Marquis of Bayers (1845–1940), who died without issue from his marriage to Élisabeth of Griffon-Sénéjac (1865–1928). The female line ended with Victoria Françoise Anne Marie of La Rochefoucauld-Bayers (1880–1950), the daughter of a cousin of Raoul-Gustave, who died unmarried (and without issue).

- François-Joseph of La Rochefoucauld-Bayers (1736–1792), brother of next, Bishop-Count of Beauvais in 1772 and Peer of France, deputy of the clergy of Clermont at the Estates General of 1789 – on 2 September 1792, with his brother and others, at Carmes Prison, was assassinated.
- Pierre-Louis of La Rochefoucauld-Bayers (1744–1792), brother of the previous, Bishop of Saintes, deputy of the clergy of Saintes in the Estates General of 1789 – on 2 September 1792, with his brother and others, at Carmes Prison, was assassinated.
- Charles-François of La Rochefoucauld-Bayers (1753–1819), deputy to the Estates General of 1789.
- Jean de La Rochefoucauld-Bayers (1757–1834), a soldier and politician; created Baron of La Rochefoucauld-Bayers in 1817.
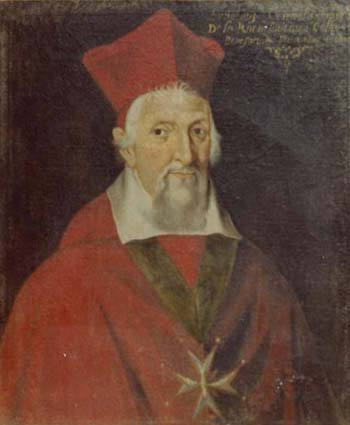
François of La Rochefoucauld (1558–1645)

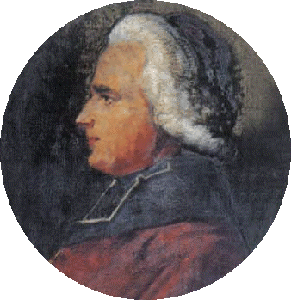
François Joseph de La Rochefoucauld (1736–1792)

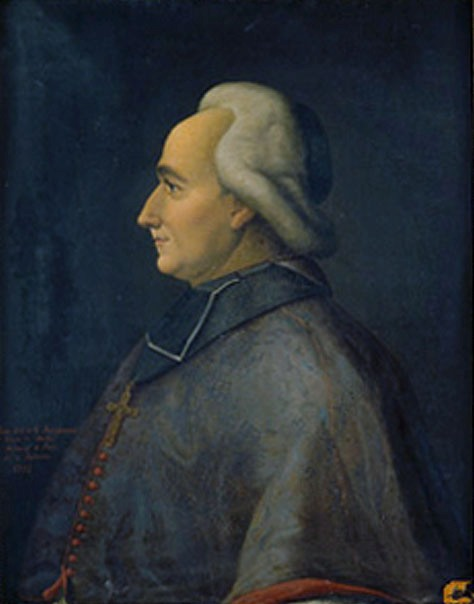
Pierre-Louis of La Rochefoucauld-Bayers (1744–1792).

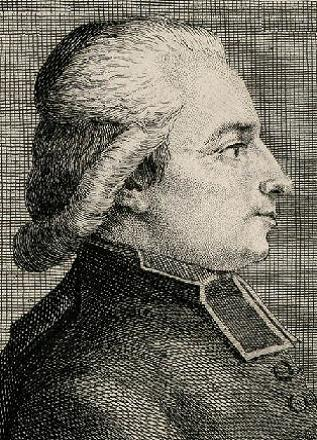
Charles-François of La Rochefoucauld-Bayers (1753–1819). Jean-Michel Moreau, le Jeune (1741–1814), illustrator; Texier G. (c. 1750 – after 1824), engraver, Dèjabin (publisher).

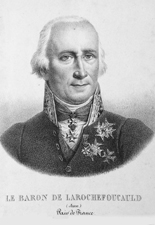
Jean of La Rochefoucauld-Bayers (1757–1834).

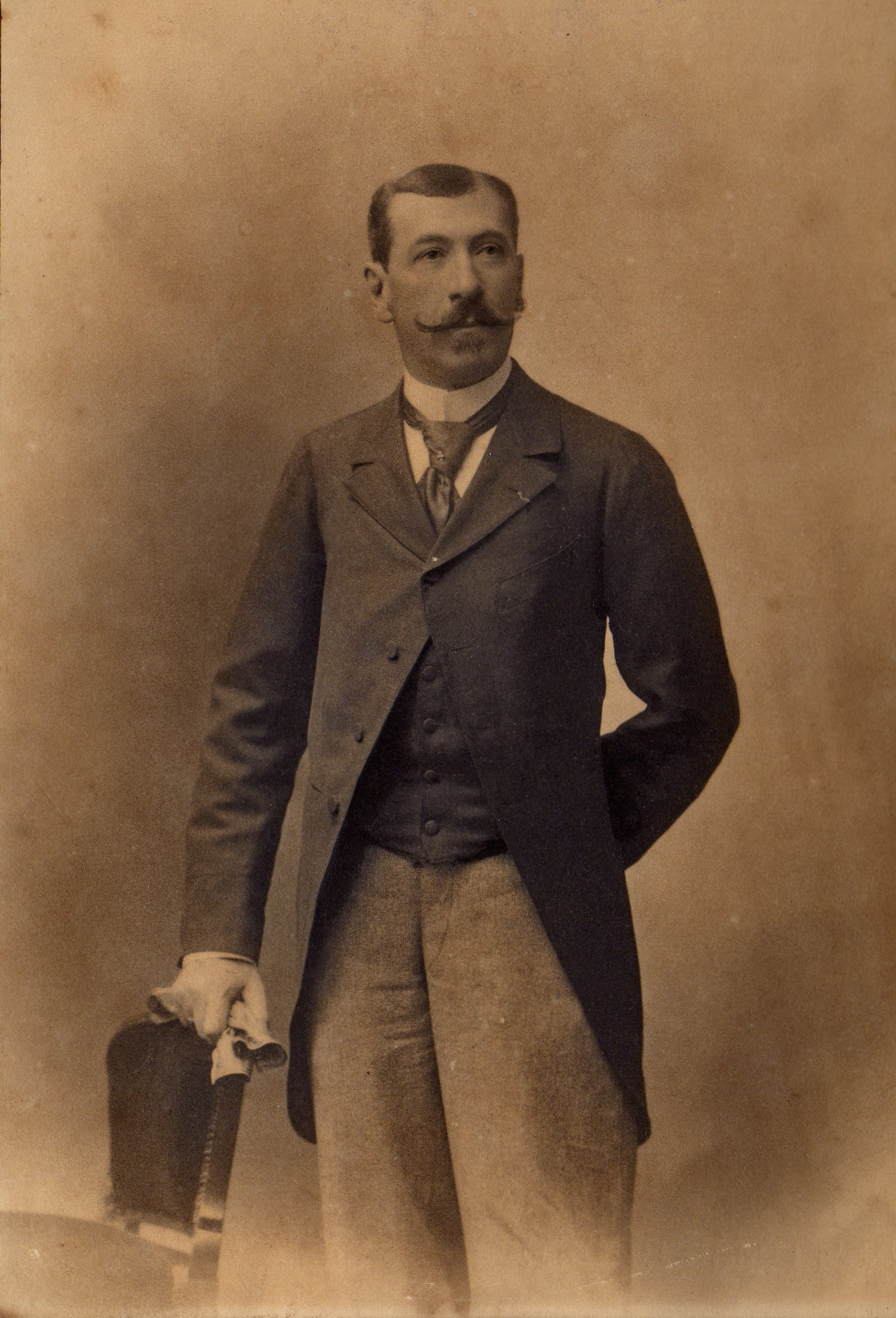
Raoul-Gustave Marie of La Rochefoucauld (1845–1940), Marquis of Bayers.

== Coat of arms ==
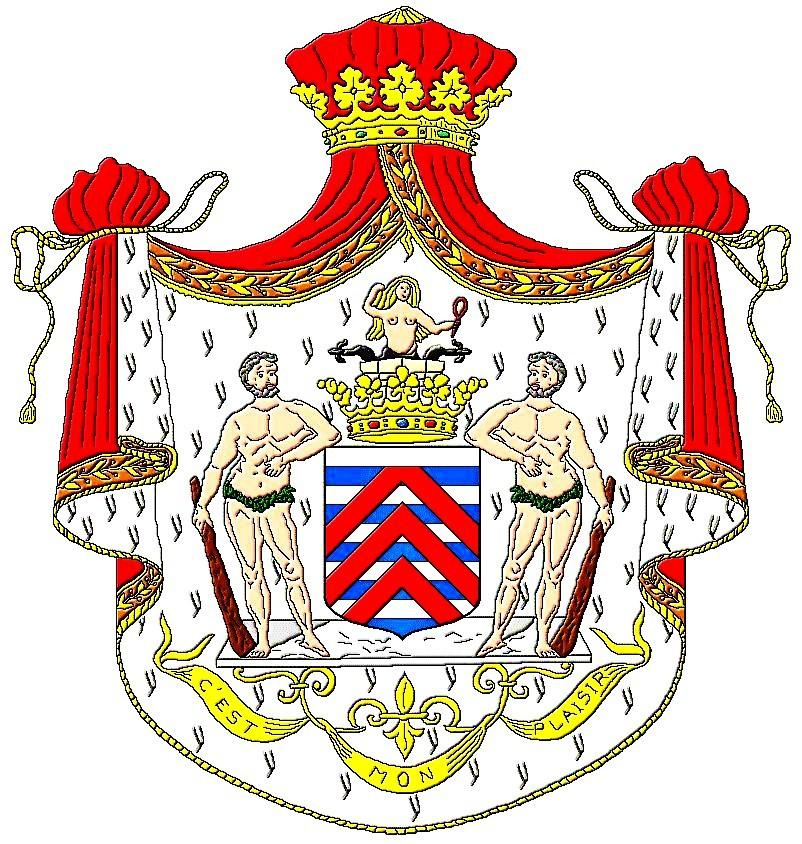
Heraldic achievement of the Dukes of La Rochefoucauld

=== Heraldic achievement ===
- Ducal pavilion: Drapery, outer red, ermine-lined, with a border pattern of golden laurel leaves, signifying nobility.
- Crest:
  1. Coronet: Ducal coronet with colored jewels (red and blue).
  2. Mermaid (siren), blonde-haired in a tub atop the coronet – dolphin-like tails, left arm holding a mirror, right arm raised or combing her hair.
- Escutcheon:
  1. Charge: 3 chevrons gules, the first truncated or topped (écimé).
  2. Field: Barruly of 10 pieces – argent and azure.
- Supporters: 2 male figures, mirrored, dexter and sinister flanked, each blond, girded with foliage, and holding a club (grounded), representing strength and protection.
- Compartment:
  1. Fleur-de-lis (center).
  2. Motto: C'est mon plaisir ("It is my pleasure").

=== Armorial ===
Coat of Arms	Name and blazon
	House of Rochefoucauld: Escutcheon, primitive arms (barruly and chevrons): 1. Barruly (traversed by barrulets or small bars) of ten argent (silver or white) and azure (blue), with three chevrons gules (red), the uppermost écimé (truncated).; These arms can be seen as those of Lusignan (barruly argent and azure) with the addition of the chevrons as a brisure. For this reason, certain authors have claimed that the House of Rochefoucauld shares a common origin with the House of Lusignan.
	Charles of La Rochefoucauld (1520–1582), Lord of Barbezieux, Linières, Meillant, and Preuilly, Knight of the Order of the Holy Spirit (admitted 31 December 1578).: Escutcheon (quarterly): 1. First (top left) and fourth (bottom right): Gules (red) with a bend argent (silver or white).; 2. Second (top right) and third (bottom left): Or (gold) (Note: In heraldry, "or" is a noun (not a conjunction) used to denote the color gold or yellow, derived from the French word for gold (see or). It is one of the two metals used in heraldic traditions, the other being argent (silver or white). Symbolically, "or" represents generosity, nobility, and prestige. See Tincture (heraldry)) with an escutcheon azure (blue).
	Order of Saint Michael: Collar of the Order of Saint Michael as used on the Royal Arms of France.; Oval medallion suspended from the collar, at the bottom, depicts Saint Michael the Archangel, shown in armor with a sword and shield bearing a cross, standing over a defeated dragon.
	Charles of La Rochefoucauld (1520–1582), more elaborate coat of arms.: Escutcheon (quarterly): 1. First (top left) and fourth (bottom right): Burely of argent (silver) and azure (blue), with three chevrons gules (red), the uppermost écimé (truncated), representing the arms of the House of La Rochefoucauld.; 2. Second (top right) and third (bottom left): Or (gold) with an escutcheon azure (blue), symbolizing an alliance with the House of Roye.; Escutcheon (center): 1. Or (gold background); two cows gules (red); horned, collared, and belled azure (blue); passant (walking toward dexter, i.e., toward the viewer's left, with the right forepaw raised and all others on the ground) in pale (stacked vertically) → See Blason of Béarn.; Collars (2) and medallions (2): 1. Outer: Collar of the Order of the Holy Spirit, featuring its characteristic design of golden flames, fleurs-de-lis, and red enameled medallions.; 2. Maltese cross of the Order of the Holy Spirit suspended from the outer collar, at the very bottom, featuring a dove at its center symbolizing the descent of the Holy Spirit.; 3. Inner: Collar of the Order of Saint Michael.; 4. Oval medallion suspended from the inner collar, albeit linked to both collars, at the bottom, above the other medallion, Saint Michael the Archangel.
	Louis François Armand of La Rochefoucauld (1695–1783), Count of Roye, 1st Duke of Liancourt, Duke of Estissac.: Escutcheon (quarterly): 1. First (top left) and fourth (bottom right): Gules (red) with a bend argent (silver or white) representing the House of Roye.; 2. Second (top right) and third (bottom left): Or (gold), a lion rampant azure (blue), armed and langued gules (red claws and tongue).; Escutcheon overall: 1. Barry of ten argent and azure, three chevrons gules (the primitive arms of La Rochefoucauld are placed at the center).
	Order of the Holy Spirit: Collar of the Knights of the Order of the Holy Spirit, celeste blue as used on the Royal Arms of France; Maltese cross, hanging from the collar, the insignia of the Order. The cross has rounded points and a dove (see Christian symbolism § Dove) at its center facing downward to symbolize the descent of the Holy Spirit upon the Apostles (Romans 8:16; Acts 2:1–4). The cross, traditionally worn as a saltire by ecclesiastics, has eight points known as boutonné, symbolizing the eight beatitudes. Between the arms of the cross is a fleur-de-lis with three petals each, collectively representing the Twelve Apostles.
	François de La Rochefoucauld (1558–1645), Bishop of Clermont (1585–1607); Cardinal of Clermont (1607); Cardinal-Priest of San Callisto (1610); Cardinal-Priest of Senlis (1610); Grand Almoner of France (1618–1632). He was a nephew of François III of La Rochefoucauld (1521–1572).: Escutcheon (center): 1. The primitive arms of La Rochefoucauld are placed at the center.; Collar and medallion: 1. Beneath the shield, hanging from a celeste blue collar, the Maltese cross.; Galero (ecclesiastical hat) with tassels: 1. The red galero with fifteen tassels (also called houppes or fiocchi) on each side signify François's status as a bishop and cardinal.

Heraldic tinctures for the Coats of Arms of the La Rochefoucauld families
Class:	Metals		Colors	
Tincture:	Argent	Or	Gules	Azure
Non-heraldic equivalent:	Silver/ White	Gold/ Yellow	Red	Blue

La Rochefoucauld Genealogy
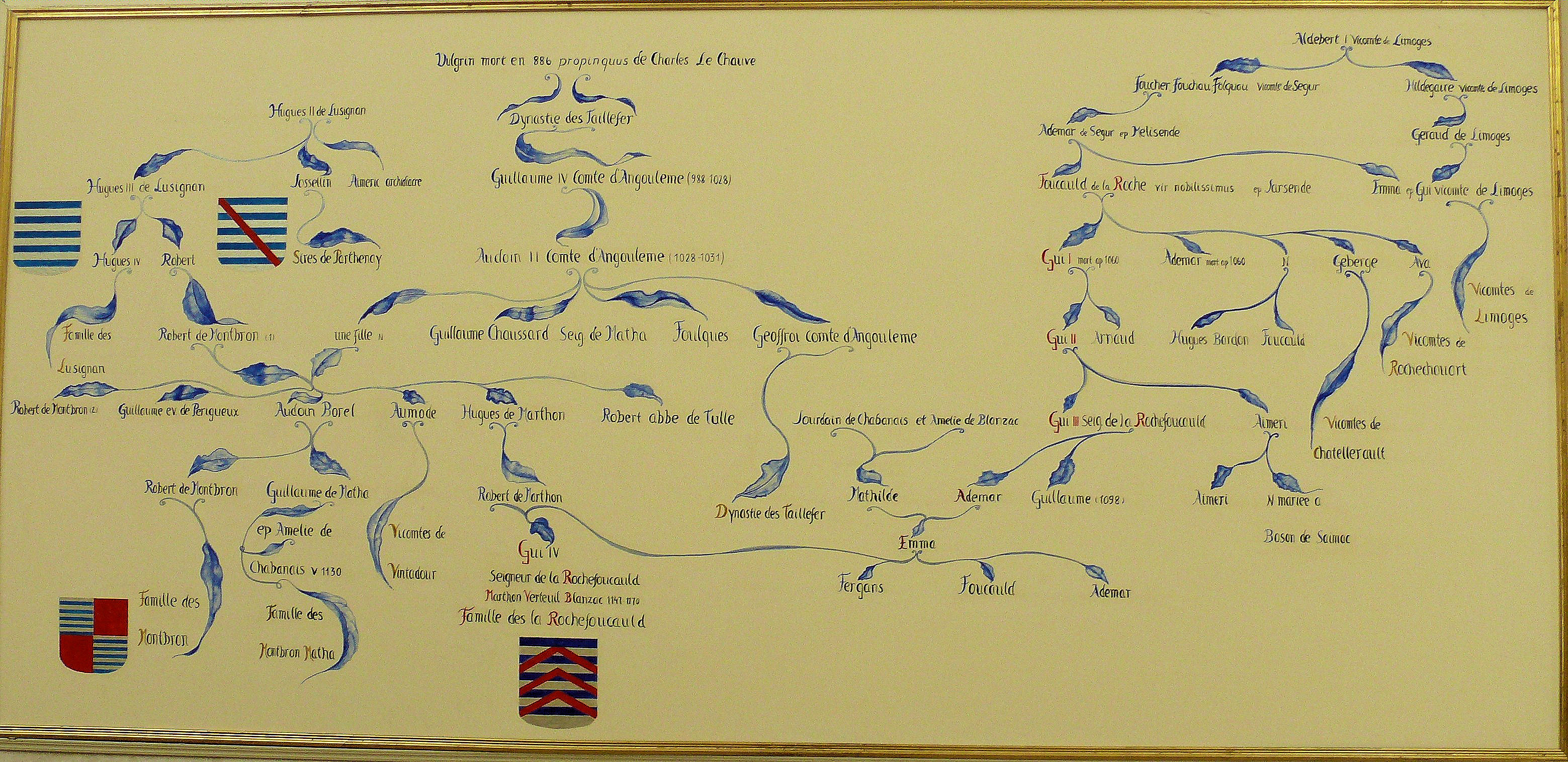

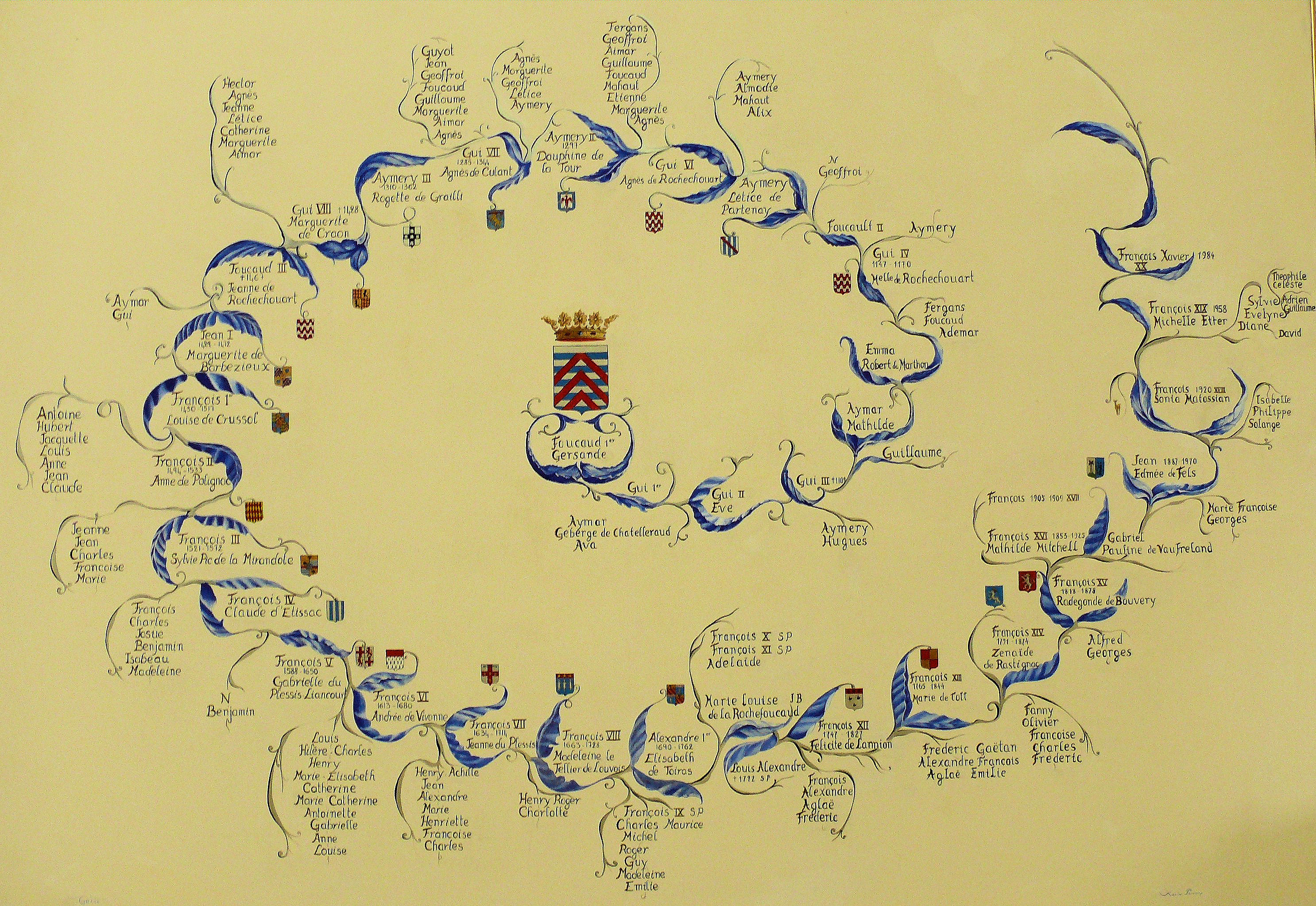

== See also ==
- Peerage of France
- List of French peerages § House of Bourbon
- List of French peers § 17th century
- Armorial of French peers
- List of French dukedoms
- Hippolyte Marie Thomas Auguste of La Rochefoucauld (1804–1893), Count of La Rochefoucauld
- La Rochefoucauld, Charente
- List of surviving families with coats of arms in 1696
- List of counts of Roucy
- List of French marquesses

== Bibliography ==
=== References ===
- Commander's Cross (Poland) (15 February 2024). "Nos sociétaires agissent" [Our Members Take Action] (PDF). Lettre d'information. Paris: Société des Amis du Musée national de la Légion d'honneur et des ordres de chevalerie (SAMNLHOC) [Society of Friends of the National Museum of the Legion of Honor and Orders of Chivalry]: 8.
On April 10, 2024, Dominique de La Rochefoucauld-Montbel, administrator and ambassador of SAMNLHOC, received the Commander's Cross of the Order of Merit of the Republic of Poland.
- Courcelles, Jean-Baptiste-Pierre Jullien de (1822–1833). Histoire généalogique et héraldique des pairs de France, des grands dignitaires de la couronne, des principales familles nobles du royaume et des maisons princières de l'Europe, précédée de la généalogie de la maison de France [Genealogical and Heraldic History of the Peers of France, the Great Dignitaries of the Crown, the Principal Noble Families of the Kingdom, and the Princely Houses of Europe, preceded by the Genealogy of the House of France ] (in French). Paris: Author: rue de Sèvres, Nº 111, Faubourg Saint-Germain. Bookseller: Arthus Bertrand, rue Hautefeuille, Nº 23". Retrieved 15 January 2025. LCCN 14-6980; OCLC 18278169 (all editions).
1. Vol. 1 (Lyon). 1822.
2. Vol. 2 (BSB). 1822.
3. Vol. 3 (BSB). 1824.
4. Vol. 4 (BSB). 1824.
5. Vol. 5 (BSB). 1825.
6. Vol. 6 (ZB). 1826.
7. Vol. 7 (NYPL). 1826.
8. Vol. 8 (KB). 1827.
9. Vol. 9 (NYPL). 1828.
10. Vol. 10 (NYPL). 1829.
11. Vol. 11 (BSB). 1831.
12. Vol. 12 (NK ČR). 1833.
- Debord, André [in French] (1984). La Société laïque dans les pays de la Charente : X^{e}–XII^{e} S. [Secular Society in the Charente Region: 10th–12th Centuries]. Paris: Picard Éditeur – via Internet Archive. LCCN 85-165393; ISBN 2-7084-0112-2; OCLC 14588525 (all editions).
p. 498.
Français : En ce qui concerne les La Rochefoucauld, outre les textes indubitables qui montrent leur origine, on peut faire une remarque supplémentaire : les armes dès La Rochefoucauld ont sou vent été rapprochées de celles des Lusignan, sans doute parce que ceux-ci devinrent comtes de La Marche et d'Angoulême, rois de Chypre..., mais on n'a jamais, semble-t-il, songé à les rapprocher de celles des Montbron. Or, l'usage des armoiries commence à se répandre à la fin du XI^{e} ou au début du XII^{e} siècle, c'est-a-dire au moment où le lignage des Robert se scinde en deux branches.
English: As for the La Rochefoucauld family, in addition to the undeniable texts that demonstrate their origin, one additional observation can be made: the arms of the La Rochefoucauld family have often been compared to those of the Lusignan family, likely because the latter became Counts of La Marche and Angoulême, Kings of Cyprus, etc. However, it seems that no one has ever thought to compare them to those of the Montbron family. Yet, the use of coats of arms began to spread at the end of the 11th or the beginning of the 12th century, that is, at the time when the lineage of Robert (Robert de Montbron; 1091–1092) split into two branches.
- Elward, Ronald (15 February 2010). "La Rochefoucauld". The Heirs of Europe. Blog of Ronald Elward (heirsofeurope.blogspot.com) – via Blogspot.
- "Grand Hospitaller". orderofmalta.int (archived link) (in French). Rome: Ordre souverain militaire et hospitalier de Saint-Jean de Jérusalem, de Rhodes et de Malte [Sovereign Military Hospitaller Order of Saint John of Jerusalem, of Rhodes and of Malta]. 2016. Archived from the original on 5 August 2016 – via Internet Archive (WayBack Machine). Originally retrieved 7 January 2018. Archived link retrieved 2 January 2025.
This static url → www.orderofmalta.int/fr/gouvernement/grand-hospitalier/ ← leads to the current Grand Hospitaller and is no longer valid for La Rochefoucauld-Montbel, whose term concluded May 2024.
- Hébrard, Antoine [at Wikidata], ed. (2005–2006). "La Rochefoucauld-Montbel". Who's Who in France (37th ed.). Levallois-Perret: Éditions Jacques Lafitte S.A. pp. 1211–1212. ISBN 978-2-85784-045-9. ISSN 0083-9531; ISBN 2-8578-4045-4; OCLC 470103318 (all editions).
- Huberty, Michel; Giraud, Alain; Magdelaine, François; Magdelaine, Bruno (1976–1994). L'Allemagne dynastique – Les quinze Familles qui ont fait l'Empire [Dynastic Germany – The Fifteen Families Who Made the Empire] (in French). 7 Vols. Perreux-sur-Marne: Alain Giraud (publisher). Retrieved 4 October 2024. LCCN 77-466780.
Article about the 7 Vol. set → L'Allemagne dynastique [Dynastic Germany] (in French)
1. Vol. 7: "Oldenbourg familles alliées : H–L" [Oldenburg Allied Families; H–L]. [Snippet view]. 1994. p. 658 (Virginia). ISBN 978-2-9011-3807-5, 2-9011-3807-1; OCLC 769877795 (all editions).
"... Jules de La Rochefoucauld, reçut en 1909 le titre de prince (Fürst) en Bavière et obtint par décret du 22.3.1922 l'autorisation de joindre à son nom celui de « de Montbel ». Son fils, Emmanuel, comte de La Rochefoucauld de Montbel..."
[ ... Jules [Louis Charles] de La Rochefoucauld (1857–1945), received in 1909 the title of prince (Fürst) in Bavaria and obtained by decree of March 22, 1922 [King Ludwig III of Bavaria], the authorization to add to his name that of "de Montbel". His son, Emmanuel, Count of La Rochefoucauld de Montbel (1883–1974) ...]
Related article → House of Oldenburg
- Knight Grand Cross of the Order of Merit of the Italian Republic (20 April 2021). "Segretariato Generale Della Presidenza Della Repubblica – Conferimento DI Onorificenze Dell'Ordine "Al Merito Della Repubblica Italiana"" [General Secretariat of the Presidency of the Republic – Awarding of Honors of the Order "For Merit of the Italian Republic" ]. Gazzetta Ufficiale Della Repubblica Italiana (Awardee: His Excellency Dominique de La Rochefoucauld-Montbel. Award date: 9 September 2020). Serie Generale, n. 94 (in Italian). pp. 18–23. ISSN 1124-0725; OCLC 786290580 (all editions).
- Knight Grand Cross (Spain) (30 December 2015). "Real Decreto 1178/2015, de 29 de diciembre, por el que se concede la Gran Cruz de la Orden de Isabel la Católica a Sua Eccellenza Dominique Príncipe de La Rochefoucauld-Montbel, Gran Hospitalario de la Soberana Orden Militar de Malta" [Royal Decree 1178/2015, of 29 December, granting the Grand Cross of the Order of Isabella the Catholic to His Excellency Dominique Prince of La Rochefoucauld-Montbel, Grand Hospitaller of the Sovereign Military Order of Malta]. Boletín Oficial del Estado. Vol. Núm. 312, p. 123685. King Felipe VI; José Manuel García-Margallo, Minister of Foreign Affairs and Cooperation. ISSN 1577-8681, ISSN 0212-033X; OCLC 58539475 (all editions), and 971645856.
- La Rochefoucauld, Bénigne Augustine Françoise de (1764–1849) (1878). Life of Mme. De la Rochefoucauld, Duchess of Doudeauville, Founder of the Society of Nazareth [Vie de Mme. De La Rochefoucauld, duchesse de Doudeauville] (autobiography). Originally in French. Translated by Hoey, Frances Cashel (1830–1908). Boston: Houghton, Osgood and Company. Cambridge: Riverside Press – via Internet Archive (Cal Berkeley). LCCN 16-13000; OCLC 2060780 (all editions).
- Malte-Brun, Victor Adolphe. La France illustrée : géographie, histoire, administration, statistique (4 Vols.). Gustave Barba, libraire–éditeur; rue de Seine, 31. OCLC 835304888 (all editions).
1. Vol. 1. Chapter 15. "Charente: La Rochefoucauld". June 1855. p. 9 (BSB).
- Malte-Brun, Victor Adolphe. La France illustrée : géographie, histoire, administration, statistique (6 Vols.). Nouvelle édition, revue, corrigée et augmentée [New edition, revised, corrected, and expanded]. Illustrations by the fine artists. Maps and plans engraved by Georges Erhard Schieble (1821–1880). Research by Eugène Boutmy (1828-). Engravings by Hubert Clerget (1818–1899). Paris: Jules Rouff [1846–1927], éditeur; cloître Saint-Honoré, 14. LCCN 11-33887.
1. Vol. 1. "Charente: La Rochefoucauld". 1881. p. 17 – via Internet Archive (Toronto).
"Les armes de La Rochefoucauld sont : burellé d'argent et d'azur de dix pièces, à trois chevrons de gueules brochant sur le tout" [The arms of La Rochefoucauld are: barruly argent and azure, overall three chevrons gules, the uppermost écimé].
- Massue, Melville Henry, ed. (1914). The Titled Nobility of Europe. An International Peerage, or 'Who's Who,' of the Sovereigns, Princes and Nobles of Europe. London, S.W.: Harrison & Sons, 45 Pall Mall. pp. 311, 349–350, 589–590. Retrieved 19 June 2024. LCCN 15-875; OCLC 2953691 (all editions).
1. Via Google Books. (Minnesota).
2. Via Google Books (1980 re-print). (Michigan State). ISBN 0-8501-1028-9.
- Mignet, François Auguste Marie (1824). Histoire de la Révolution française, depuis 1789 jusqu'en 1814 [History of the French Revolution, From 1789 to 1814]. Troisième et seule édition, continuée jusqu'à la seconde rentrée du Roi [3rd and only ed., continued until the second return of the King (Louis XVIII) → i.e. the book covers events up to 1815, the second restoration of Louis XVIII] (in French). Brussels: Aug[ust] Wahlen et Comp^{e}., Imprimeur-Libraire [Printer & Bookseller]. p. 66 (KU Leuven). OCLC 1403503855 (all editions).
- "New York Times (The)". ISSN 0362-4331 (print), ISSN 1553-8095 (online); OCLC 1645522 (all editions).
1. "Miss Mitchell's Wedding. The Civil Marriage to the Duke de La Rochefoucauld". Vol. 41, no. 12625. 11 February 1892. p. 1 (col. 3, top) – via TimesMachine.
2. "American Duchess Dies. Widow of Duc de la Rochefoucauld Was Former Mattie Mitchell". The New York Times. Vol. 82, no. 27422. 21 February 1933. p. 19 (col. 6) – via TimesMachine.
3. "Son of Duchess Dead. Mother Is a Daughter of the Late Senator Mitchell". Vol. 58, no. 18675. 12 March 1909. p. 3 (col. 2, bottom) – via TimesMachine.
- Pattou, Etienne (2004) [last updated 1 June 2024]. "Maison de La Rochefoucauld" (PDF). Angoumois – via Racines & Histoire [Roots and History]. racineshistoire.free.fr
- Potter, Edward, ed. (2004). Foreign Intelligence and Information in Elizabethan England: Two English Treatises on the State of France, 1580–1584. Camden Fifth Series. Vol. 5. Cambridge University Press. p. 95 (footnote 251). LCCN 2005-412901; ISBN 0-5218-4724-9, 978-0-5218-4724-7; OCLC 58474859 (all editions).
1. Potter, David (2004). Via Internet Archive (Kahle/Austin Foundation). Cambridge University Press. ISBN 978-0-521-84724-7.
2. Via Google Books (RHS).
- Rank of Officer (France) (1 January 2015). "Ordre national de la Légion d'honneur". "Décret du 31 décembre 2014" ... "Grande chancellerie de la Légion d'honneur Portant promotion et nomination"; "Au grade d'officier" ... "M. de La Rochefoucauld de Montbel" ["National Order of the Legion of Honor". "Decree of 31 December 2014". "Concerning Promotion and Appointment" ... "Grand Chancellery of the Legion of Honor; To the Rank of Officer" ... "Mr. de La Rochefoucauld de Montbel"] (PDF). Journal officiel de la République française. Vol. Text 8 of 62. ISSN 0373-0425.
- Rolland, Victor; Rolland, Henri (1926). De l'armorial général de J.-B. Rietstap [From the General Armory of J.B. Rietstap] (re: Johannes Baptist Rietstap; 1828–1891). (7 Vols.) (in French). The Hague: Martinus Nijhoff (1826–1894). LCCN 73-440170; OCLC 17287314 (all editions).
1. Vol. 2: "H–Z" Supplément Par V. H. Rolland. June 1855. OCLC 17287314 (all editions).
  1. Via Google Books (Michigan).
    1. Fascicle XXVI:. June 1855. p. 417.
"Rochefoucauld (de La) d'Estissac. — Angoumois. Écartelé [voir aussi : Armes composées § Écartelé] aux 1^{er} [canton dextre du chef] et 4^{e} [canton senestre de la pointe] de gueules à la bande d'argent (de Roye) ; aux 2^{e} [canton senestre du chef] et 3^{e} [canton dextre de la pointe] de La Rochefoucauld, qui est burelé d'argent et d'azur à trois chevrons de gueules brochant, le premier écimé. Sur le tout de Roucy, qui est d'or au lion d'azur".
[Rochefoucauld (de La) d'Estissac. — Angoumois. Quarterly: 1st (top left) and 4th (bottom right), gules (red) with an argent (silver or white) bend (of Roye); 2nd (top-right) and 3rd (bottom left), of La Rochefoucauld, featuring barry of argent and azure (blue) with three chevrons gules (red) (representing La Rochefoucauld), brochant (overlying the field), the uppermost écimé (a French heraldic term for "cut off" or "truncated"). Overall (on an inescutcheon), of Roucy, which is gold with a lion azure (blue)].
- Rietstap, Johannes Baptist (1828–1891) (1884). Armorial général : précédé d'un dictionnaire des termes du blason [General Armorial: Preceded by a Dictionary of Coat of Arms Terms]. Vol. 2 (2nd ed.). Gouda: G.B. van Goor Zonen (Gerard Benjamin van Goor; 1816–1871) (Wikidata – Wikidata Q106397529, Wikidata Q13638584, Wikidata Q111371735, and Wikidata Q1555849). Retrieved 31 January 2025. LCCN f01001105; OCLC 39344028 (all editions).
1. Vol. 1. 1884 – via Internet Archive (University of Toronto).
2. Vol. 2. 1884 – via Internet Archive (University of Toronto).
  1. "Rochefoucauld (de la). 1884. p. 586 – via Internet Archive (University of Toronto).
  2. "Burelé d'arg. et d'azur; à trois chev. de gu., br. sur le burelé, le premier chev. écimé." ["Barry of argent and azure; three chevrons gules overall, the first chevron truncated."]
- Rolland, Victor; Rolland, Henri Victor. Armoiries des familles contenues dans l'armorial général de J.-B. Rietstap (6 Vols.) (in French). OCLC 3743777 (all editions).

See: Johannes Baptista Rietstap (1828–1891)
Planches de l'armorial général de J.-B. Rietstap [Plates of the General Armory of J.B. Rietstap]:

1. Vol 5: P–S (plates 1–377). The Hague: Martinus Nijhoff (1826–1894) (Michigan). 1921.
  1. Plate 174: "La Rochefoucauld (de La) Angoumois".
- Sainte-Marie, Pierre Anselme de.
  Histoire – Généalogique et chronologique – De la maison royale – De France, des pairs, grands officiers. De la Couronne et de la Maison du Roy, et des anciens barons du royaume ; avec les qualitéz, l'origine, le progrès et les armes de leurs familles ; ensemble, les statuts & le catalogue des chevaliers, commandeurs & officiers de L'Ordre du Saint-Esprit. Le tout dressé sur titres originaux, sur les registres des chartes du Roy, du Parlement, de la Chambre des Comptes & du Châtelet de Paris, cartulaires, manuscrits de la Bibliothèque du Roy & d'autres cabinets curieux.
  [History – Genealogical and Chronological – Of the Royal House of France, the Peers, and the Grand Officers of the Crown and the King's Household, and of the Ancient Barons of the Kingdom; with the Ranks, Origins, Progress, and Arms of Their Families; Together with the Statutes and the Catalogue of the Knights, Commanders, and Officers of the Order of the Holy Spirit. All compiled from original documents, from the registers of the King's charters, of the Parliament, of the Chamber of Accounts, and of the Châtelet of Paris, cartularies, manuscripts from the King's Library, and from other notable collections]
  . Continued by Honoré Caille, Lord of Fourny (1630–1713); reviewed, corrected, and expanded through the efforts of Father Ange (né Père Ange de Sainte-Rosalie; 1655–1726) and Father Simplicien (1683–1759), Discalced Augustinians. 4th ed: Further corrected, annotated, and completed by Pol Potier de Courcy (1815–1891). Printers & publishers → Paris: Firmin Didot Frères, Fils et C^{ie} [Firmin Didot Brothers, Sons & Company: Firmin Didot (1764–1836), Ambroise Firmin Didot (1790–1876), and Hyacinthe Firmin Didot (1794–1880)], libraires-éditeurs, Printers of the Institut de France, ᴍ ᴅᴄᴄᴄ ʟxᴠɪɪɪ (1868). Reprint of the 1726–1733 edition → Paris: Compagnie des Libraires. 1st ed. published in 1674. Première Réimpression 1968, Editions du Palais Royal, Paris. Printed in former West Germany by Anton Hain KG, Meisenheim am Glan. Retrieved 30 September 2024. OCLC 82754743 (all editions).
1. Vol. 4. Chapter 21: "Généalogie de la maison de La Rochefoucaud". pp. 387–430 – via Via Google Books (Ohio State).
- Sainty, Guy Stair (2018). "The Constantinian Order of Saint George and the Angeli, Farnese and Bourbon Families Which Governed It". Boletín Oficial del Estado. Madrid: Kingdom of Spain. p. 394. ISBN 978-8-4340-2506-6. OCLC 1088531428..
1. Via Google Books (preview only). RHS.
- Saint-Simon, Fernand de; Seréville, Etienne de (1975) [1977]. Dictionnaire de la noblesse française [Dictionary of the French Nobility] (2 Vols. → Supplément is the 2nd Vol.). Series: La société française au XX^{e} siècle [French Society in the 20th Century] (in French). Paris: Éditions Contrepoint. p. 35. Retrieved 30 September 2024. LCCN 77-568176; BnF 34584509w; OCLC 3628307 (all editions), OCLC 751504632 (all editions), OCLC 461574494 (all editions).
1. Supplément (no preview (Minnesota)).
2. Supplément (no preview (Michigan)).
- Saisseval, Guy Coutant de [in French] (1966). Les Maisons impériales et royales d'Europe [The Imperial and Royal Houses of Europe] (snippet view). Paris: Éditions du Palais-Royal. p. 153 (Cal Berkeley). LCCN 67-70502; OCLC 7522226 (all editions).
- Valles, Claude de (1631). "Le sieur de Barbezieux, Charles de la Rochefoucault [sic], Seig^{r} de Barbezieux, Con^{er} d'Éstat, cappitaine de cinquante hommes d'armes des ordonnances, gouverneur de Champagne" [The Sieur of Barbezieux, Charles de la Rochefoucauld, Lord of Barbezieux, Councillor of State, Captain of Fifty Men-at-Arms of the Ordinances, Governor of Champagne]. Recueil de tous les chevaliers de l'ordre du S^{t} Esprit, depuis l'institution jusques en la présente année mil six cens trente un, avec les armoiries, noms, surnoms, dignités et qualités desdits chevaliers, par ordre des chapitres qui ont este tenus [Collection of All the Knights of the Order of the Holy Spirit, From Its Institution Until the Present Year 1631, With the Coats of Arms, Names, Surnames, Dignities, and Qualities of Said Knights, in the Order of the Chapters That Have Been Held] (manuscript) (in French). Compiled and arranged by Sieur de Valles, from the town of Chartres in Beauce, residing in Lyon, Knight of the Order of Saint Michael, later, Secretary and Genealogist of the very Christian King of France and of Nauarre (Louis XIII). Paris. pp. 27–28 – via BnF (Gallica). Gallica btv1b8470172t; OCLC 829494767, 1177175303.
