= Bertillon =

Bertillon is a French surname. Notable people with the surname include:

- Alphonse Bertillon (1853–1914), French police officer and biometrics researcher
- Jacques Bertillon (1851–1922), French statistician and demographer
- Louis Bertillon (1821–1883), French statistician and demographer
- Suzanne Bertillon (1891–1980), French decorator, journalist, lecturer, and resistance fighter

== See also ==
- Bertillonage
