= Flower Town =

Flower Town may refer to:

- Flower Town, Kentucky, an unincorporated community in Pendleton County
- Flower Town Station, a railway station in Sanda, Hyōgo Prefecture, Japan
- Fictional location in Nikolay Nosov's fairy tale novels about Dunno

== See also ==
- Flourtown, Pennsylvania, a census-designated place (CDP) in Montgomery County
