= Asplund =

Asplund is a surname, of Swedish origins. Notable people with the surname include:

- Arne Asplund (1903–1993), Swedish scientist and inventor
- Bengt Asplund (born 1957), Swedish cyclist
- Bo Asplund (fl. 1998), Swedish diplomat
- Carl-Erik Asplund (1923–2024), Swedish speed skater
- Gunnar Asplund (1885–1940), Swedish architect
- Jennie Asplund (born 1979) and Johanna Asplund (born 1981), Swedish members of the rock band Sahara Hotnights
- Johan Asplund (1937–2018), Swedish sociologist
- Johan Asplund (ice hockey) (born 1980), Swedish ice hockey player
- Josefin Asplund (born 1991), Swedish actress
- Karl Asplund (1890–1978), Swedish poet, short story writer, and art historian
- Lena Asplund (born 1956), Swedish politician
- Lillian Asplund (1906–2006), last American survivor of the sinking of the Titanic
- Rasmus Asplund (born 1997), Swedish ice hockey player
- Tore Asplund (1903–1977), Swedish-born American painter

== See also ==
- Asplundh Tree Expert Company, American based tree trimming/utility company
- Asplund Library, Rotunda library building in Stockholm, Sweden designed by Swedish architect Gunnar Asplund
