= CEPEC =

CEPEC may refer to:

- California Earthquake Prediction Evaluation Council
- Centre d'études politiques et civiques, a French conservative think tank co-founded by René Gillouin in 1954
- Centro de Pesquisas do Cacau, a Brazilian agricultural research facility located in Ilhéus, Bahia; see Index xylariorum
- CEPEC (production company), film production company of French filmmaker Jacques Tati
