= Dunno on the Moon =

1965 novel by Nikolay Nosov

- Author: Nikolay Nosov
- Original title: Незнайка на Луне
- Language: Russian
- Publication place: USSR

Dunno on the Moon (Russian: Незнайка на Луне) is a fantasy novel by Nikolay Nosov from the series about the adventures of Dunno with elements of science fiction. This is the final part of a trilogy of Nosov's novels, consisting of the works The Adventures of Dunno and His Friends (1953-1954), Dunno in the Sun City (1958), and Dunno on the Moon (1964-1965).

For the first time novel, Dunno on the Moon was published in the magazine Family and School (rus. Семья и школа) in the years 1964–1965. A separate edition of the book was published by Detskaya Literatura in 1965.

In 1969 Nosov was awarded the RSFSR State Prize commemorated to Nadezhda Krupskaya for his trilogy of works about Dunno. In 1997–1999 at the studio FAF Entertainment on the script of Vladimir Antonovich Golovanov and Sergei Ivanov based on the novel was shot.

== Characters ==
- Dunno (Незнайка, from Russian "не знаю", "I don't know") - the title character of the trilogy and the most infamous personality in Flower City. As an anti-hero, this boy-Mite is both ignorant, lazy, rude, and conceited and at the same time curious, kind, enterprising, and unbelievably lucky. He is highly reminiscent of the popular Russian folk hero Ivan the Fool. Restless and mischievous. The ringleader and the prankster. He is often (unwittingly and not out of malice) the organizer of various ridiculous schemes..(Znayka considers him a bully, a slacker and a fool
- Doono (Знайка, from "знаю", "I know") - a boy-Mite scientist, the smartest of the boy-Mites, often adopts the leadership roleThe exact opposite of Dunno..
- Roly-Poly (Пончик, or "doughnut") - a very chubby boy-Mite who likes to eat sweets. Dunno's best friend
- Bendum (Винтик, or "little bolt") and Twistum (Шпунтик, from "little peg") - boy-Mite mechanics.
- Dr. Pillman (Доктор Пилюлькин, from "пилюля", or "pill") - a boy-Mite physician.
- Glass-Eye (Стекляшкин, from "стекляшка", or "piece of glass") - a boy-Mite astronomer.
- Blobs (Тюбик, or "tube") - a boy-Mite painter.
- Trills (Гусля, from "гусли", or "gusli") - a boy-Mite musician.
- Posey (Цветик, or "bloomer") - a boy-Mite poet.
- Fuchsia (Фуксия) and Selyodochka (Селёдочка, "small herring") - girl-Mite scientists.
- Professor Starman (Профессор Звёздочкин) — full member of the Academy of Astronomical Sciences, scientific opponent of Doono, then his friend and colleague.
- Klyopka (Клёпка — "rivet") - a boy-Mite engineer.
- Kubik (Кубик, "block, brick, little cube") - a boy-Mite architect.
- Kozlik (Козлик — a little goat) — a smart unemployed Moon dweller who quickly becomes Dunno's friend after they meet in jail.
- Miga (Мига, from «миг» — a brief instant, or «мигать» — «to blink») — a cheater who meets Dunno in jail and with Zhulio's help talks him into founding a «Giant Plants Company».
- Zhulio (Жулио, an amalgamated word from жулик — a swindler, cheater, and the Portuguese name Julio) — a firearms-store owner, Miga's friend.
- Spruts (Спрутс, from спрут — a giant octopus).
- Krabs (Крабс, from «краб» — «crab») — Sproots' personal assistant.
- Skuperfield (Скуперфильд, an amalgamated word from скупердяй — miser and the English surname Copperfield).
- Dubs (Дубс, from «дуб» — «oak», also «dumb man» in Russian).
- Other Millionaires.
- Kolosok (Колосок, «little ear» [for example, of rye]) and other poor peasants who have received seeds from Doono.
- Figl (Фигль), Migl (Мигль), Drigl (Дригль), Vrigl (Вригль) and other policemen.

== Plot ==
=== Beginning ===
Even before the events described in the book, Doono with Fuksiya and Selyodochka from Sun City visited the Moon surface and brought out the moon mineral with extraordinary properties (later called lunit). After a number of events it turns out that its rapprochement with the magnet gives the effect of local weightlessness that can allow to send to the Moon a spaceship with large crew and supplies on board. As Doono hopes, there is intelligent life over there, which due to the loss of the atmosphere has moved inside of the Moon. The cosmonauts take the seeds of terrestrial cultivated plants with them. However, the exclusion of Dunno from the flight for stealing the weightlessness device from the Pavilion and careless handling of it, which nearly led to its loss, brings to these plans unexpected adjustments. Dunno instigates Roly-Poly, who was also not included into the crew, to fly as stowaways. The day before the launch they snuck into the rocket. At night before the flight Roly-Poly has changed his mind, but instead of getting out of the rocket accidentally launched it into flight in automatic mode.

After the Moon landing Dunno and Roly-Poly come out in space suits for a walk to a nearby mountain. In a cave Dunno falls into an icy tunnel leading down to the internal cavity of the Moon and slides down, apparently sitting down, thereon in the sublunary space. Going down on a parafoil, he finds on the inner core of the Moon (which the locals call the Earth, too) with the civilization of the same shorties, but living according to the laws of capitalism. The size of lunar plants, in contrast to terrestrial, is proportional to the height of the shorties so they appear to be undersized for Dunno. Roly-Poly, after losing Dunno, runs in panic back to the rocket.

Being on the Moon, Dunno, unfamiliar with the concepts of money (lunar currency — "ferting" (author-derived from British "farthing") consisting of a hundred of "santik" (author-derived from French "centime")) and private property is always getting into unpleasant situations. At first, he appears in the garden of Mr. Klops and eats his raspberries, that's why he was grabbed and hounded by order of Klops as a thief. Dunno, fortunately, managed to escape over the fence, while he did not understand what was, in fact, his fault. Then he was taken to jail for refusing to pay in a street cafe, where during registration through a system of identification using simplified Bertillon method he was mistakenly identified as the famous gangster Pretty Boy (Красавчик), as a result the police were extorting a bribe, and Dunno's refusal and complete misunderstanding of the situation were regarded as intractability and he was placed into a prison cell. There he met unemployed Mite Kozlik and small crook Miga. Miga believed the story of Dunno about the seeds of giant plants, helped him to avoid a scuffle in the cell, and before the release of Dunno from prison gave him a letter to his friend, arms dealer Zhulio.

After leaving the jail Dunno and Kozlik come to Zhulio. He makes a bail for Miga and all four are discussing the prospects for growing terrestrial plants on the Moon, the seeds of which were left in the rocket on the Moon surface. To raise funds for the construction of an aircraft capable to reach the outer Moon surface, they start a joint-stock company called "The Society of Giant Plants", whose shares are secured by future shares of prospective seeds (i.e., at the beginning of the company's activities it is actually a consumer cooperative). In doing so they promote the fact of Dunno's arrival as an cosmonaut in mass media and using methods of outdoor advertising (it was especially effective in the countryside, whose residents, as a rule, do not buy newspapers). Gradually the shares are selling. Their activities are disturbing the local monopolists, because appearance of giant plants threatens them with devastation. Spruts, their leader, the largest landowner and owner of the textile and sugar factories, takes measures to collapse their company. He bribes Miga and Zhulio, and they run with the cash received for the shares, leaving Dunno and Kozlik to their fate. At the same time fragmentary allusions to the fraudulent nature of the company, launched by the editor of Spruts-owned newspaper, Grizzle, lead to a panic among small shareholders. Remaining unaware about what was happening Dunno and Kozlik are forced to flee, and go to San Komarik. Not finding there Miga and Zhulio, they have found themselves on the dark side of life. They wander, with hunger and disasters in flophouses without any work.

Meanwhile, stock traders Zhmurik, Teftel and Hanakonda are buying huge batch of the Society's shares on an upward trend, and are taking steps to rectify the situation of their cheapness by entering an information war in the media against Spruts' newspapers. Skuperfild, the owner of the pasta factory, being in the dark about the backstage war of financial speculators, spent almost all capital buying Society's shares, but Spruts deals a decisive blow: he published the documentary details about the collapse of the company. All shares have depreciated at one moment, and as a result Skuperfild was on the verge of bankruptcy. In desperation, he reduced his workers' pay down to half — initially workers threaten to strike, and then have declare it. Then Skuperfild decides to recruit new workers among the inhabitants of flophouses in San Komarik. Among those hired were Dunno and Kozlik. Cars with new employees have arrived in Brehenville. According to the Skuperfild's plan, they should immediately get to work. But striking regular workers becomes aware of this trick. The strikers organize a defense - in cold blood they push newcomers away from Skuperfild's factory and begin to frantically chase them all over the city, as a result unfortunate Dunno and Kozlik are thrown into the river. Dunno lost shoes, Kozlik lost hat. To earn some money, Kozlik takes Dunno's hat and goes to the city, Dunno remains under a bridge. There he soon met a group of other homeless. Kozlik failed to scrape up a santik in a strange city, he came back with nothing. They dined a piece of bread, that one of the tramps (Bubble) gave them and stay with tramps overnight. Police shut down lights on the embankment and arrested whole company in the middle of the night, except Bubble, who was able to take out one of the attackers with his own stun baton and escaped down the river on an inflatable rubber pillow. In the end Dunno and Kozlik sent to The Fools' Island for the sleeping outside and for not having boots and hat. On Fools' Island lunar shorties in course of time turn into rams exposed to harmful air.

Roly-Poly, after abandoning Dunno to his fate, is trying to stifle the voice of conscience with continuous absorption of food. Eventually, he ate a year's supply of food in the rocket in four days. Deciding to go in search of food, he returns to the cave, falls inside of the Moon, but as a result of rotation of the "inner Moon" found himself in another place. Unlike Dunno, Roly-Poly, as a more cautious and practical Mite, quickly learns the essence of commodity-money relations. In addition, he gets lucky from the outset and he opens a new market niche — sale of salt. He quickly gets richer, hires workers for the salt production, but soon go bankrupt, unable to compete with owners of large factories, led by Dracula — the owner of the coast with raw salt. After the bankruptcy Roly-Poly becomes "Twister" — a worker at an amusement park, actuating rides. After some time he joins the "Society of Free Twisters" (Trade union analogue).

=== Expedition from Earth ===
Doono with friends found disappearance of the rocket with Dunno and Roly-Poly on board, and organize a rescue mission. Having built a new multistage rocket FaH ("Fuchsia and Herring"), 12 shorties led by Doono go to the Moon. Having found big rocket (called "DaR" ( "Dunno and Roly-Poly")) empty, they go in search of Dunno and Roly-Poly and discover the icy corridor leading to the inner cavity of the Moon. Having discovered large deposits of lunit and antilunit (Mineral which levels effect of the lunit, with a smaller radius of action than lunit), Doono and his companions go down in a rocket on the ice corridor.

However, lunar astronomers employed by Spruts inform him about the arrival of the new rocket. Therefore, while approaching city of Fantomas rocket was fired upon and Doono has been forced down in the countryside. Police raid on earthlings ends in complete failure after the use of weightlessness by Doono.

Earthlings have founded the "Space City", come into contact with the villagers, give them the seeds of giant plants, as well as supplying all of them weightlessness devices and antilunit. Armed with this "terrible power" — weightlessness, they overthrow the capitalists. Roly-Poly came out to another "Twisters" during all of these events and tell them that he's alien. They sent him on train to Fantomas, from where he reached the "Space City". Roly-Poly offered to search for Dunno on Fool's island. Earthlings arrived in Los Paganos and seized one of the ships. With the help of the captain Rumbik, familiar to Roly-Poly, characters get to the Fool's island and rescued Dunno and Kozlik, who already begun to turn into a ram, and other doomed shorties. Dunno offers to bury weightlessness device in the middle of Fool's island so harmful air, converting shorties to rams, went up and the fresh sea air would start come to the island. But it didn't come to that. (You never know where it will go with the wind). Characters come back with Dunno and Kozlik to the "Space City". Dunno feels bad. Dr. Pillman diagnosed him with an acute nostalgia and noted the need for urgent return to Earth. Despite the sabotage of Spruts and Zhulio, who blew up the FaH rocket, earthlings fly away using propellers at spacesuits and the device of weightlessness. On the surface of the Moon, they boarded the DaR rocket and made their way back to Earth. Once home, Dunno immediately healed, and declared that "now we can go somewhere on a journey again."

== Lunar capitalism ==
The novel was written as a satire on Western capitalism of that time. Some things are too exaggerated, some things, on the contrary, remained to this day. According to the writer's grandson, Igor Nosov, Dunno on the Moon was ahead of the time, becoming a factual description of post-Soviet Russia, describing its inherent "wild capitalism". The following are the main features of the Lunar Society:

- Splicing of the oligarchy and the government. In fact, the political power in the novel is not shown, and the police directly obey orders of monopolists. It is even said that "The Rich hide behind laws they made up".
- Persecution of trade unions and workers' organizations.
- Great role of fictitious capital (see exchange trading of shares of companies, including already non-existent).
- Almost complete monopolization of the business — mainly in the form of syndicates (see the description of the operation of "bredlams").
- Certain features peculiar to pre-capitalist formations (monetary sharecropping in the extraction of salt on the coast belonging to the landlord Dracula).
- Fighting both economic (dumping — see the resolution of the "Salt bredlam" in regard to small producers of salt) and non-economic methods including criminal. (Forced upon false-bankruptcy of "The Society of Giant Plants"; Dubs proposal to hire assassins to "remove" Zhulio and Miga; gasoline traders' suit against tire manufacturer Poodle after a stop in Davilon all traffic due to the cutting of tires on all cars after the letter saying that the alleged bank robbery money are hidden away in car tires).
- Significant unemployment, including congestive.
- Widespread presence of the day labor.
- An extensive network of primitive uncomfortable flophouses ("Dead End" type of hotels) in all cities.
- Providing of budgetary services on a "payment on the fact" scheme ("Economical" hotel).
- Draconian legislation against vagrancy and pauperism: anyone who spends the night on the street or walks without shoes or a hat becomes a target for the police and should be sent to the Fools' Island.
- Great susceptibility of the population to advertising (see gingerbread ads of the "Dawn" candy factory, whose poster Dunno, the space traveler, was holding, these gingerbread originated excess demand and shops managed to sell even the stale goods; everyone's desire to be treated only at Dr. Injector, after he had personally examined Dunno, the guest from another planet, in front of the TV viewers)
- Product placement of Spruts' products, such as foods, in newspapers owned by Spruts (particularly in the "Davilon Humoresques").
- Unfair advertising (e.g. "hidden fees" in the "Economical" hotel).
- Crowd manipulation through the mass media (see campaign against the existence of the seeds of the giant plants, dependence of stock prices on what is written in newspapers, advertising and anti-advertising).
- Kickbacks — when Spruts invites members of the "Big Bredlam" to chip in together on 3 million to bribe Miga and Zhulio. Spruts collected from the monopolists 3 million and left to himself 1 million (initially intending to leave 2 million).
- Conspicuous consumption of both rich and poor (see description of the lifestyle of a soap factory owner Gryazing; purchase of a car on a loan by Kozlik); rich people are not engaged in capital increase, but in irrational squandering the money, breaking furniture for their own entertainment or doing other meaningless waste of money (dog restaurants, hair salons, etc.).
- Primitive cinema, television and painting. Abstract scribble masquerading as art. Movies are exclusively about violent clashes between police and criminals, mass brawls, deafening firefights, dizzying pursuits (in short only thrills and no benefit either for the mind or soul). This was even more distinctive on the Fool's island, where movies in cinema were said to be even more primitive than elsewhere.
- Undemanding, immoral and often violent public entertainment (see "Funny Puppet Show").
- Censorship of the media.
- Neglect of fundamental scientific research that does not produce direct benefits.
- Extensive corruption of both police and judiciary, bribery and impunity for the rich (see extortion of bribe from Dunno by Migl, recognition of total bribe of police by judge Vrigl, "Mutual Aid Society", undivided executive and judicial powers).
- Free arms trading, including auto firearms and even artillery (a machine gun and a cannon in the warehouse of the "Store of different-caliber goods"), as well as free trade of police and gangster armor: police uniforms, batons, lock picks, masks, crowbars, knives for hacking safes and so on.
- The interest of the police is only in the fight against gangsters, but not in the elimination of gangsterism ("if there are no bandits, the police become unnecessary and policemen will be without a job"). This explains the existence of free arms trade and why the police turns a blind eye to that.
- Countering to strikebreaking by supporters of the Workers' self-management in the Skuperfield's factory.
- Introduction of elements of the state of emergency with the appearance of a threat to the ruling regime.
- Police brutality - The policemen were portrayed as feared and brutal men who always dealt with others in threatening or violent manner and had no issue with excessively using their stun batons. When "bald headed" Mite accused them of stealing a large sum of money in a bank robbery, they resorted to mass arrests of bald headed shorties. They were also willing to immediately use lethal force on Donno and other members of Lunar Expedition, when they refused to leave. The police also handed out corporal punishments (beating and electrical shocks) for minor crimes, as many criminals, including Dunno, were thought to let themselves be jailed on purpose to get access to free food, shelter and hygiene.

In the satirical purpose the names of the rich and their minions and most of the names of lunar cities are derived from words with a negative shade (Grabenberg - "Stealberg", Brehenville - "Liarville", the cities Los Svinos - from "svinya" (pig, swine), Los Paganos - from "poganyi" (filthy); Spruts (from "sprut" - giant octopus), Gryazing ("gryaz'" - dirt), Dryaning ("dryan'" - trash), Skuperfield ("skuperdyai" - miser), judge Vrigl ("vrat'" - tell lies) etc.). The novel also used the names of famous villains (Dracula the salt magnate, Fantomas city).
