= Céline Renooz =

Belgian writer (1840–1928)

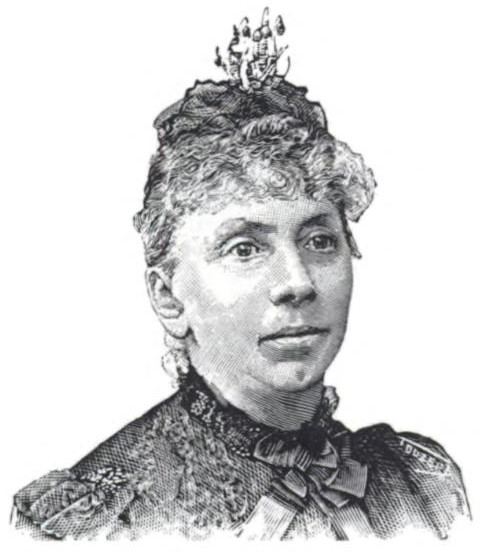
- Engraving of Renooz circa 1905
- Born: 7 January 1840; Liège, Belgium
- Died: 22 February 1928 (aged 88); Paris, France
- Occupation: Writer
- Notable work: La Nouvelle Science; L'Ère de vérite

Céline Renooz (7 January 1840 – 22 February 1928) was a Belgian feminist writer and activist known for her works on evolution, epistemology, and historiography.

After a troubled marriage and the birth of four children, Renooz left her husband to launch a writing career in Paris. In a prolific series of books, lectures, articles, and correspondence, she advocated for the demolition of patriarchal structures and viewpoints that oppressed women. Her philosophy, known as "neosophism," outlined an alternative, non-male-dominated approach to science, and championed matriarchy as the ideal social system. Her later works brought the neosophist approach to the field of historiography, critiquing male-centered societal narratives and suggesting a new feminist interpretation of historical events.

Renooz's theories were too radical for most feminists of her time, and her attempts to redesign the scientific method were not supported by women scientists with more formal training. Her ideas were largely dismissed and ignored by the male-dominated scientific establishment she criticized; her last works were written in poverty. However, Renooz was recognized as one of very few women who had become notable in French scientific circles, and regarded by feminist colleagues as a supporter in their campaigns against oppression.

== Early life ==
Renooz was born in Liège. Her mother was from Paris; her father was Emmanuel-Nicolas Renoz (he preferred this simplified spelling), a government-appointed notary who had played a significant role in the Belgian Revolution of 1830. His outspokenly liberal views were reportedly a strong influence on his daughter. Because of his politics, the Catholic Church did not give him a religious burial, a rejection which led to a public conflict between local Catholics and liberals. After his death, his library was inherited not by Céline Renooz but by her brother, who claimed it by arguing that "it was the man's responsibility to provide books for his family."

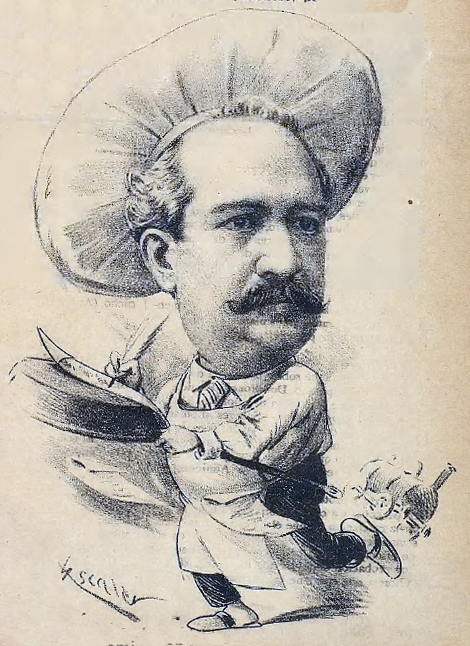
Ángel Muro, husband of Céline Renooz.

Renooz's formal training was limited to the basic lessons typical of female education in the nineteenth century. In 1859, she married an engineering student, Ángel Muro Goiri, the son of a well-known and politically active Spanish banker. After their marriage, they moved to Madrid and had four children together. However, their marriage became conflicted, and in 1875 Renooz left her husband to live with her children in Paris. Muro went on to become a journalist for French and Spanish newspapers, but was best known as the author of a popular Spanish cookbook, El Practicón.

== Career ==
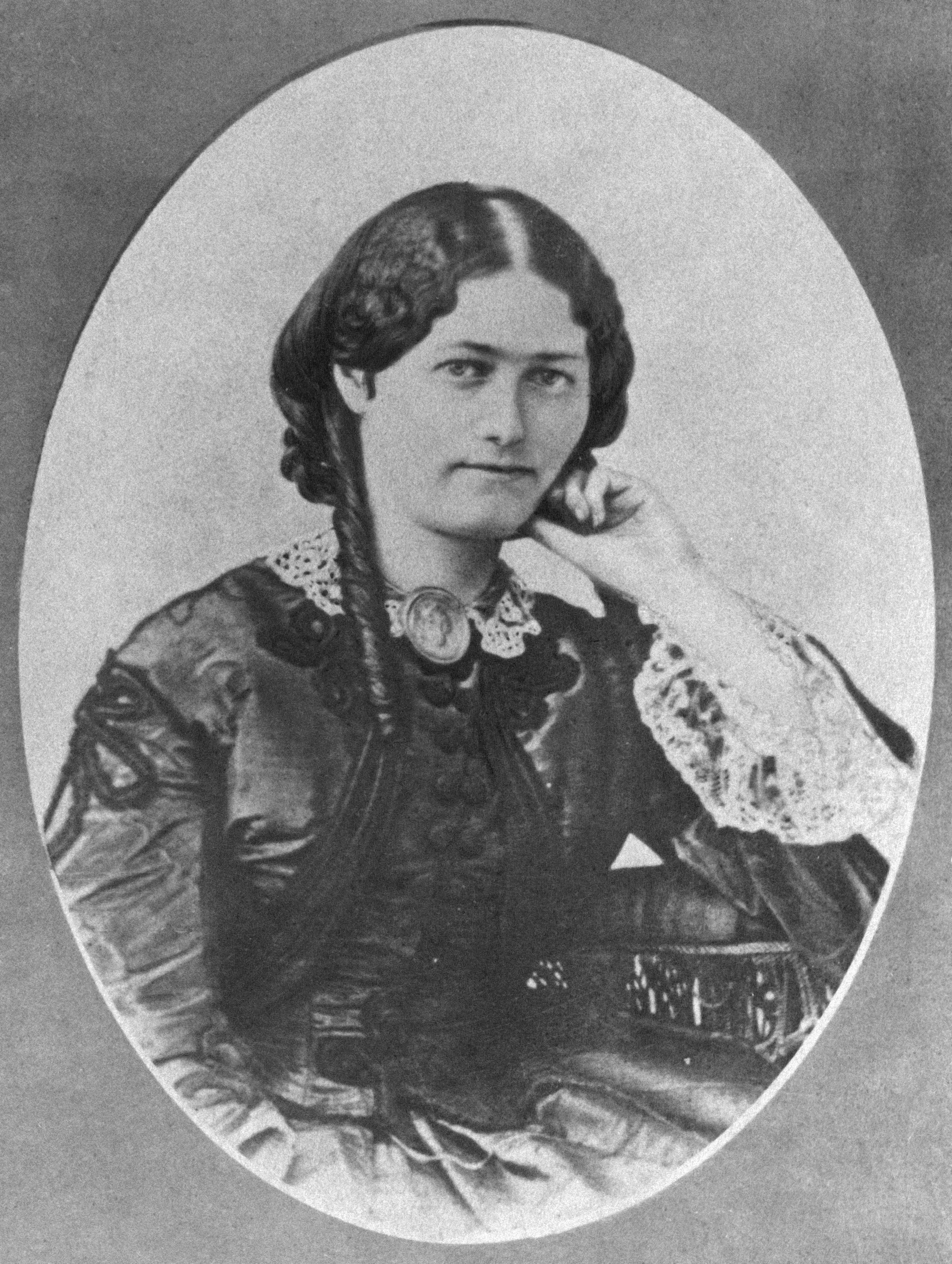
Renooz corresponded with the translator and scholar Clémence Royer

After separating from Muro, Renooz began a prolific career in writing and feminist activism, publishing polemical journalism and more than a dozen volumes on social and scientific topics. Renooz's writings are marked by a strong interest in evolution and anthropology, an openly anticlerical stance, and a radical missionary zeal for the importance of motherhood. Her works argue that women require a social status superior to men, promoting matriarchy as a social ideal. Her philosophy synthesized and adapted ideas from numerous contemporary theorists, including Patrick Geddes, John Arthur Thomson, and Johann Jakob Bachofen, into a woman-centered alternative view of science and history, which she referred to as the 'New' Science.

=== Evolutionary theory ===
Her first book, L'Origine des animaux (1883), was written in response to Charles Darwin's The Origin of Species, which had been published in France in an 1862 translation by Clémence Royer. Renooz described Darwin's theory as unscientific, arguing instead for an evolutionary theory based on embryology. Renooz concluded that humanity's ancestors could be traced to the plant kingdom and specifically to the bean family, a concept possibly influenced by Ernst Haeckel's recapitulation theory. In Renooz's theory, the human head corresponded to the root ball of a plant, and the body to the stem and branches. Renooz rejected the idea of natural selection in human evolution, saying that humans were inherently cooperative (as she believed plants to be), rather than competitive like other animals. In an article, Renooz reported that her plant-based theory was not derived from research, but had come to her in a flash of intuition as she was leaving the Bibliothèque nationale de France after reading Claude Adrien Helvétius's De l'homme. She later attributed her other theories to the same intuitive power manifesting itself on other occasions.

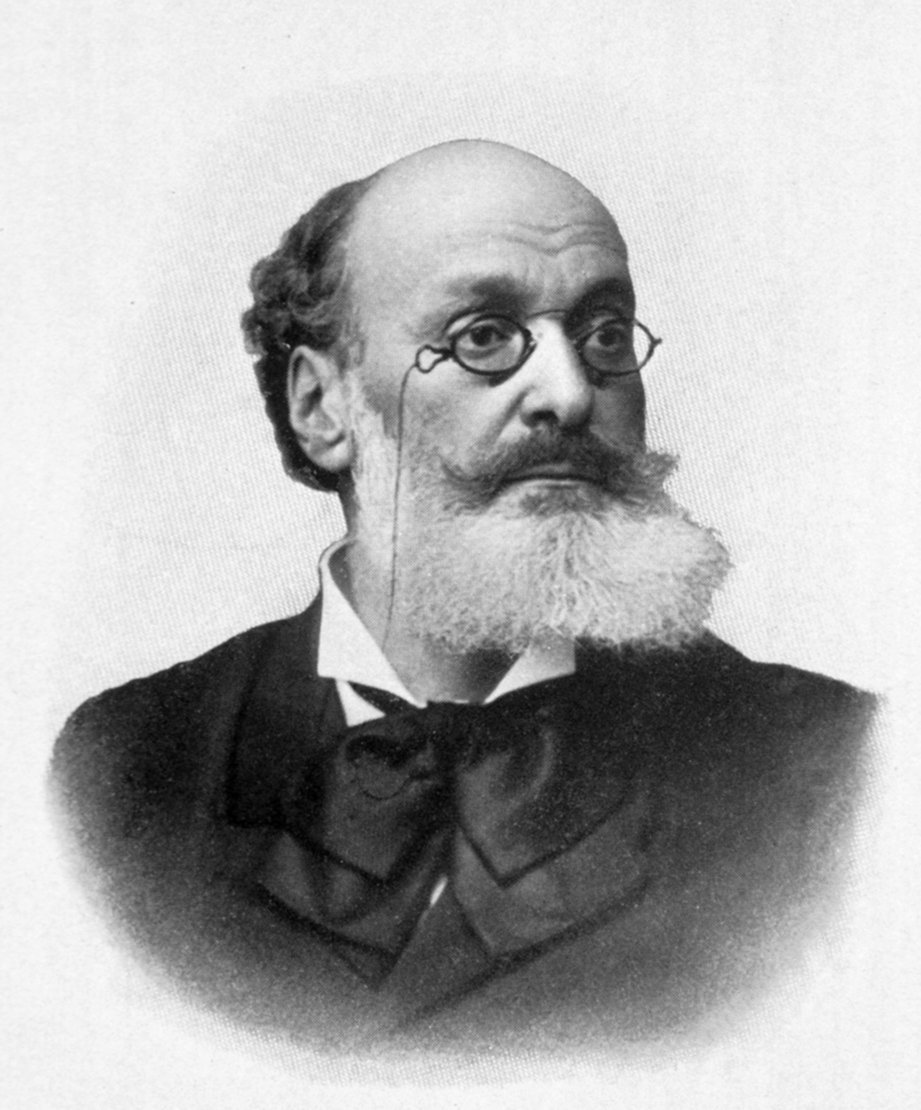
Mathias-Marie Duval dismissed Renooz as demented

The male-dominated scientific establishment criticized and poked fun at Renooz's evolutionary theory. The publishers, at the well-known firm of Baillière, publicly dismissed it by claiming that they had not read the work before publishing it. In a face-to-face 1887 encounter, the scientist Mathias-Marie Duval informed Renooz that she was demented. Renooz remained deeply troubled by Duval and the confrontation for years afterward, writing in her memoirs: "By his colossal struggle against Woman, he embodied the terrifying and satanic figure of the antichrist … Duval was the vandal of science." Other criticisms provoked similarly bitter responses from Renooz; as time went on, she began to see enemies everywhere in an obsession amounting almost to paranoia. Another influence on Renooz's worldview were her memories of her troubled marriage, which she called a "sad apprenticeship" that led her to discover the "roots of evil."

In 1887, Edmond Hébert, the dean of the University of France Faculty of Sciences, invited her to give a lecture at the Sorbonne explaining her theory, but the lecture, like the treatise, was received poorly.

=== Neosophism ===
In 1888, Renooz founded a journal, La Revue scientifique des femmes, dedicated to reshaping the scientific method by combining it with a feminist understanding. Renooz hoped this combination would bring about an intuition-based "true science" free from patriarchal bias. According to Renooz's editorial in the first issue:

It is on woman that this task is incumbent. It is she, with the aid of that faculty, intuition, for which men, even the most unjust, recognise her, who should give back to the world the light that will regenerate intellectual life which has gone away, morality which has disappeared, faith in supreme truth, enthusiasm for great and holy causes.

The Revue included reports of achievements by women physicians and scientists, as well as long preview excerpts of a new three-volume treatise she was writing, La Nouvelle Science. Renooz also used the journal to expose situations in which women were mistreated by the scientific establishment, such as Jean-Martin Charcot's antagonism and snobbery toward women entering medical fields. Though the Revue gathered a small group of enthusiastic contributors, including the physician Caroline Schultze, it was not a financial success and folded after a year.

The three volumes of La Nouvelle Science were published in book form in 1890. The first volume, La Force, outlined a new framework for understanding physics, with special attention paid to stellar evolution and the formation of carbon. The volume described oxygen as the universe's main physical and spiritual power, engaged in a conflict with its "evil enemy" nitrogen. Other physical forces were described as "goddesses." The second and third volumes were Le Principe générateur de la Vie and L'Evolution de l'Homme et des Animaux. All three continued and amplified Renooz's mission to replace the conventional body of scientific knowledge with new intuitive theories, an epistemological philosophy she referred to as "neosophism."

In 1892, Renooz learned that the Société de Physiologie was to hold its second annual conference in her hometown of Liège. She contacted the director of the conference and arranged to give a lecture on her evolutionary theories, becoming the only woman present among some two hundred scholars gathered at the conference. Unlike her Sorbonne lecture, her Liège presentation was a marked success, and was even reported to be the most applauded lecture at the conference. On the strength of her presentation, she was invited to contribute to the newspaper L'indépendance Belge. She returned to Belgium in 1893 to give two lectures in Brussels, one on evolution and one on comparative physiology of men and women; over the next twenty years, she lectured prolifically in Paris on topics related to neosophism.

Renooz became the subject of fresh ridicule when, after S. A. Andrée's Arctic Balloon Expedition of 1897, Renooz published a letter about the expedition in Le Matin. She attributed the expedition's failure to polar winds, which—according to the oxygen theories she had laid out in La Nouvelle Science—made polar discovery impossible. Published responses to Renooz's letter ranged from simple satire to contradiction based on evidence (including a refutation from the geographer Élisée Reclus), but all were dismissive. Other physics ideas Renooz espoused included the theory that perturbations on Mars were caused by incandescence. Renooz also argued that modesty was an artificial construct derived from men's embarrassment with their bodies; she believed that women were naturally inclined toward nudity and innately proud of their bodies as an outward sign of their "moral superiority."

During the Dreyfus affair, Renooz was a Dreyfusard (supporter of Alfred Dreyfus's innocence), saying that both Dreyfus and herself had been shunned and unjustly treated by society. Between 1890 and 1913, she worked sporadically on an autobiography, Prédestinée: l'autobiographie de la femme cachée; it was never finished or published. In 1897, Renooz founded a society, the Société Néosophique, to help raise funds to publish her books.

=== Historiography ===
Shortly after founding the Société Néosophique, Renooz designed a two-semester course in women's history, taught from her house in the Rue du Bac for twelve francs a semester. The course used a feminist historiographical approach to emphasize women's historical importance, covering such topics as the hypothetical golden age of matriarchy; women's contributions in founding communities and religions; witchcraft and witch hunts; the querelle des femmes in the Renaissance; and the place of women in contemporary society.

Renooz's interest in historiography developed into her magnum opus, the six-volume treatise L'Ère de vérité, five volumes of which appeared between 1921 and 1927 (the sixth was released posthumously in 1933). The book used anthropological and linguistic hypotheses to argue that women's contributions to early communities had been much more substantial than previously assumed, and that these contributions had been suppressed by later patriarchal societies. For example, she speculated that King Solomon's Temple had been designed by a woman, Mirah, represented in the Freemasonry tradition as the male figure Hiram Abiff ("Hiram" being "Mirah" backwards). Similarly, she argued that the true founder of Christianity was a woman named Johana, portrayed in canonical scriptural texts as John the Baptist, and that Jesus was a myth invented by men anxious to assert dominance and prevent goddess worship. "In order to justify his power," Renooz summarized, "he (man) claimed that it had always existed."

== Personal life ==
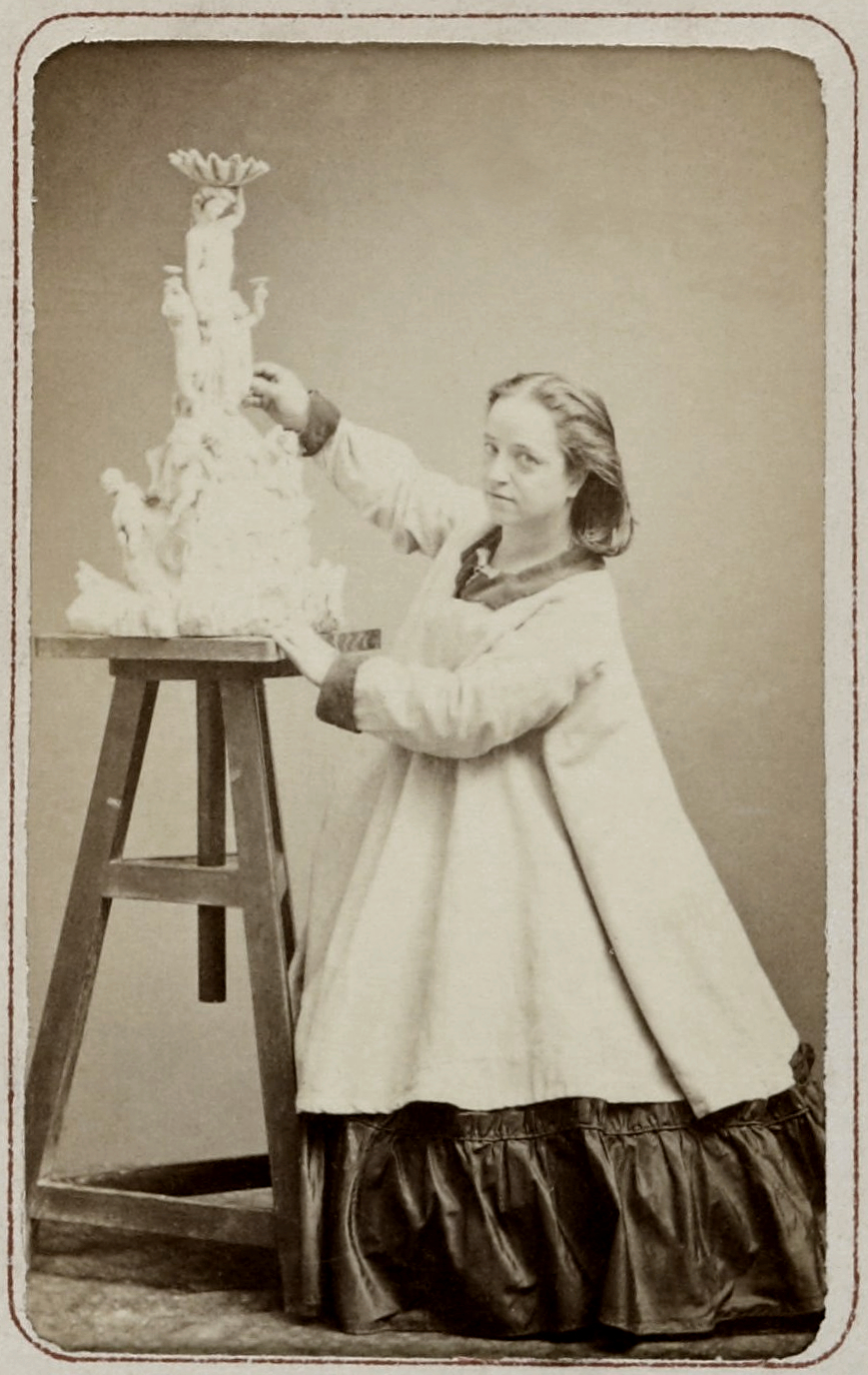
Renooz's colleague Hélène Bertaux

Renooz was an acquaintance of Clémence Royer, periodically corresponding with her for more than twenty years. Renooz also corresponded with the French feminist artist Hélène Bertaux and with many other colleagues, including both supporters and skeptics of her theories. In 1903, Renooz joined a mixed-gender Masonic lodge, La Raison Triomphale. She was also a member of the Société d'Ethnographie de Paris and the Société botanique de France, the two Paris scientific societies that allowed women without formal training.

Céline Renooz get 3 daughters and a son: Maria Louise Ernestine, born in Paris in 1860; Irène Antonia, also born in Paris, in 1861; Manuel Juan Fernando, born in Chelles in 1863; and eventually Alice Valentina Josefa, born in Bilbao in 1869. Maria and Irène did not get married and lived with their mother until their death, in 1886 in Paris for Irène, in 1910 in Paris for Maria. Manuel Muro, was hired for the Spanish government's finance committee when he was nineteen; however, he too died of tuberculosis in 1890 in Paris. Though Renooz's independent life in Paris began on a generous budget, it soon grew financially precarious, and much of it was spent in poverty.

An American journalist who visited Renooz in 1919 described her as "a little, aristocratic, old woman of probably eighty with keen, starry eyes and a soft voice," living in a small top-floor apartment in a backstreet near the Trocadéro. After a short period of illness, Renooz died in Paris in 1928. Her ashes are interred in the columbarium at Père Lachaise Cemetery.

== Reception and legacy ==
During her lifetime, Renooz's theory of neosophism had a small following of advocates, but it was largely rejected by feminists with more scientifically rigorous training, such as Madeleine Pelletier. Nevertheless, Pelletier treated Renooz fairly sympathetically, seeing her as an ally in the wider feminist struggle against oppression. In 1917, Renooz was elected honorary president of Women's Action (Action des femmes), a suffragist group with a pacifist worldview based on Renooz's matriarchal theories. Renooz and Royer were cited by contemporaries as the only women who had managed to make their names known in the heavily male-dominated world of French science.

Renooz's philosophy was far more radical than that of most nineteenth-century feminists, and her theories never achieved widespread acceptance. After her death, her works lapsed into obscurity. At the end of the twentieth century, however, some French feminists revived Renooz's writings, citing her as a predecessor.
