= Edmée de La Rochefoucauld =

French writer and women's suffragist

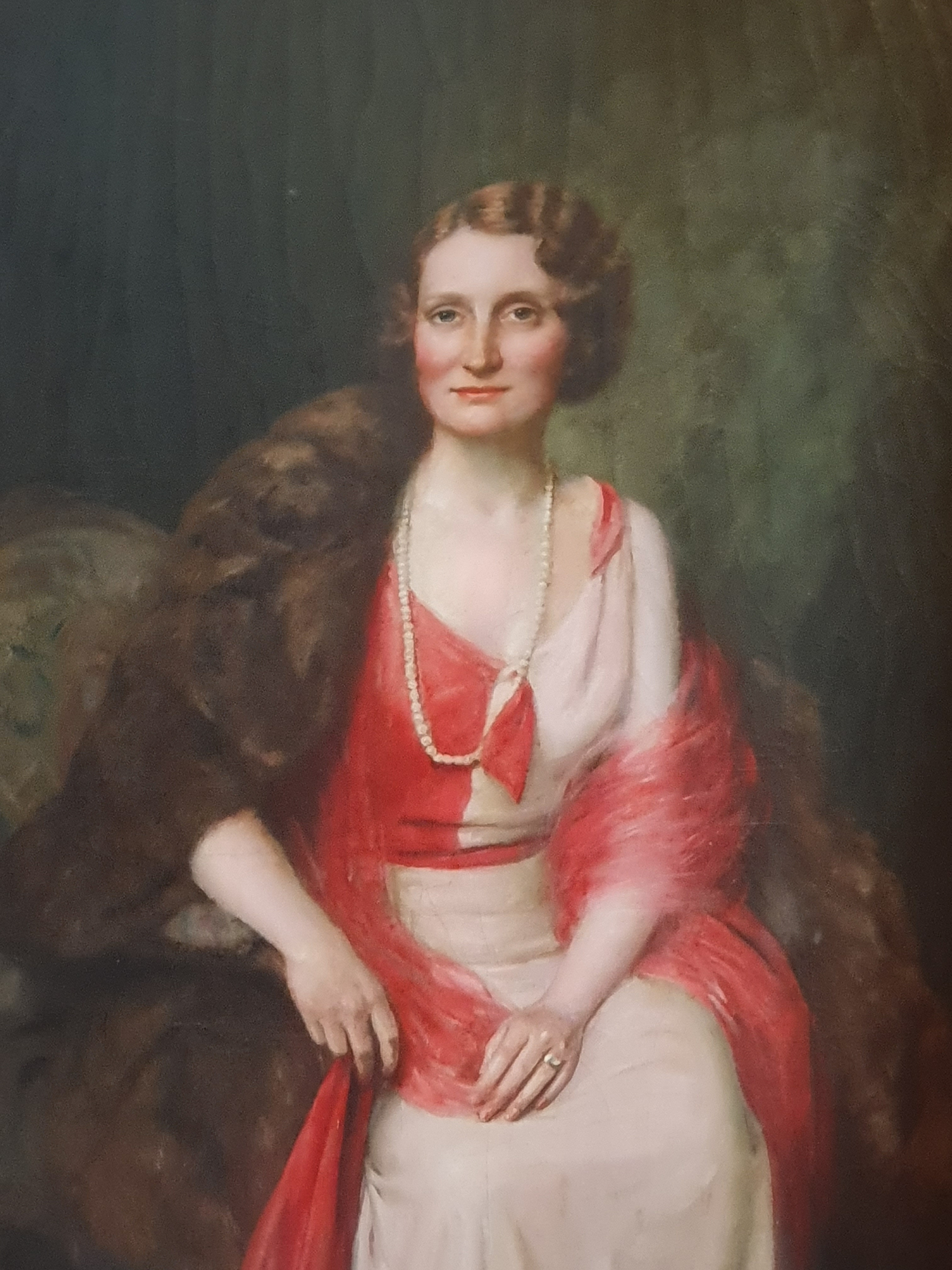
- Born: 28 April 1895; Paris, France
- Died: September 20, 1991 (aged 96); Paris, France
- Writing career
- Pen name: Gilbert Mauge
- Language: French

Edmée de La Rochefoucauld (1896–1991) was a French activist for women's voting rights and a writer, sometimes using the pseudonym Gilbert Mauge.

== Early life ==
Edmée Frisch de Fels was born in Paris, France on April 28, 1895, the daughter of Edmund, Comte de Fels, director of the Revue de Paris, and Comtesse de Fels, née Jeanne Lebaudy, who was a founder of the Union Nationale pour le Vote des Femmes (UNVF). On December 27, 1917, she married Jean, Duc de La Rochefoucauld, heir to La Rochefoucauld ducal title. They had two sons and two daughters.

== Career ==
De La Rochefoucauld was a Catholic leader in French women's efforts to win the right to vote. She became an officer in the UNVF in 1927 and became its president in 1930. In 1927, she founded and directed the UNVF's periodical L'Union nationale des femmes (National Union for the Vote for Women).

For more than 60 years she was also a central figure in French world of letters, publishing her first book Fonction de X in 1926. In 1938, she reported on Spanish Civil War. In 1944, she became a member of jury for the Prix Fémina. In the 1950s, she published studies of Anna de Noailles, poet Leon-Paul Fargue, Yvan Goll, and Paul Valéry. She also assisted her brother André de Fels who had become publisher of Revue de Paris, from 1961 to 1970. She was elected to the Belgian Royal Academy of the French Language and Literature in 1962 and later that decade, published a guide to Cahiers of Paul Valéry (1964–1966).

She published her last book in 1989, at age 94. It was the final installment in her three-volume memoir entitled Flashes.

== Death and legacy ==
She died in Paris on September 20, 1991. She was 96.

Beginning in 1990, the Prix Edmée-de-La-Rochefoucauld is awarded annually to a first-time novelist. As of 2020, the prize included an award of 3000 Euros.

== Awards and honours ==
She was a commander of the French Legion of Honor.

== Publications ==
- Nombres (1926)
- Faust et Marguerites (1927)
- La Vie humaine (1928)
- Spanish Women (1938)
- La Femme et ses droits (1939)
- Les Moralistes de l'intelligence (1945)
- La Vie commode aux peuples (1947)
- Vus d'un autre monde (1950)
- Plus loin que Bételgeuse (1952)
- Choix de poèmes (1955)
- Menton (1962)
- La Nature et l'esprit (1965)
- Femmes dramaturges (1968)
- Courts Métrages (1970)
- Spectateurs (1972)
- L'Acquiescement (1978)
- Courts Métrages II (1980)
- Flashes (3 vols., 1982–89)
