= Caroline Schultze =

Polish physician

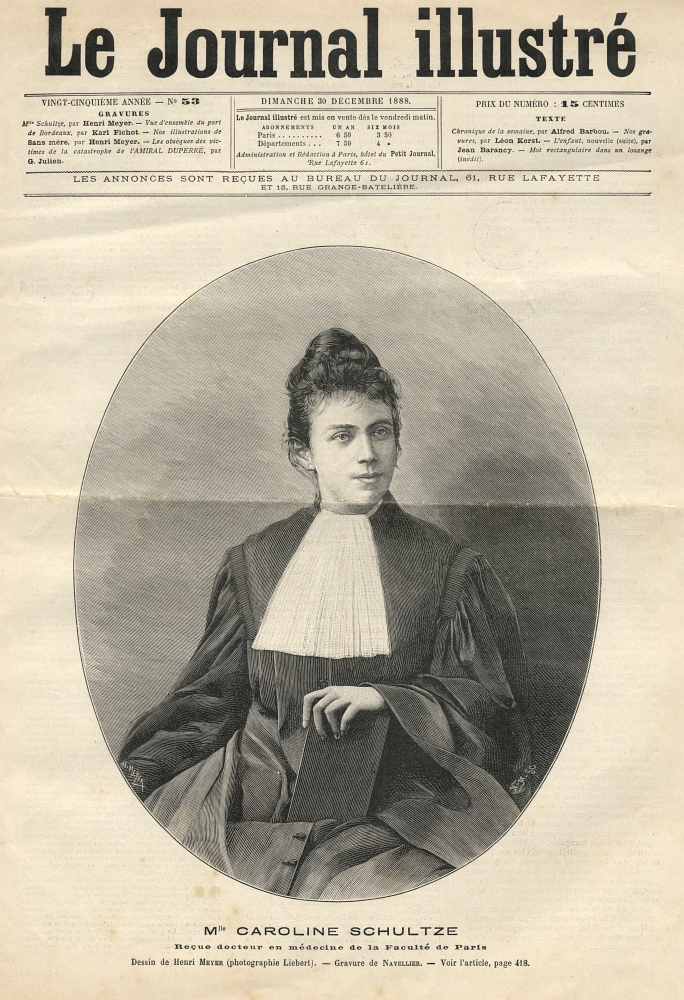
Schultze on the front page of Le Journal illustré

Caroline Schultze (born Karola Szulc, 20 May 1866, died 6 January 1926) was a Polish physician who studied, worked, and settled in France.

Schultze was born into a highly musical Jewish family in Warsaw, Congress Poland. Her father, Adam (Abraham), was a musician (1828/1830-1906). Her paternal uncle, Henryk/Hayim Szulc, also known as Heinrich Schulz, was a prominent Polish composer. Her first cousins included Henryk's sons: Leon, a cellist; Maurycy/Moritz, a clarinetist, Josef Szulc/ Joseph Schultze (1875-1956), chef d'orchestre and composer in Paris; and Bronislaw Schultze (1881-1955), chef d'orchestre and composer in Tel Aviv. She was related to Ignatz Waghalter via her mother.

She gained a baccalaureat in 1884 and became a medical student at the University of Paris. In 1888, at the age of 22, she completed a doctoral thesis, "The Woman Physician in the Nineteenth Century." Schultze argued in the thesis that the achievements of women doctors were part of "a general movement of intellectual and professional emancipation for women" that had begun in the 1850s. Her thesis defense was controversial, with the neurologist Jean-Martin Charcot objecting to the "pretension" of Schultze's argument that medicine could be practiced ably by women as well as by men. However, the thesis was finally accepted, and Schultze won the doctorate.

Schultze's thesis was influential, inspiring a wave of dissertations by other French women scholars on women-related topics. It also inspired various novels about "new women," featuring women doctors and other professionals as protagonists and investigating the dilemma of balancing a career with family matters. Schultze was part of the flourishing of women's education in the later nineteenth century, as one of the thousands of women completing university degrees; she was also one of many women of her time who, having been barred from advanced training in their home countries, relocated to find it elsewhere.

In 1888, Schultze was one of the contributors to La Revue scientifique des femmes, a short-lived journal edited by the feminist activist Céline Renooz. Schultze later worked as the chief physician for women employees of La Poste, the French postal, telegraph and telephone service.

Schultze married the statistician Jacques Bertillon; they had two daughters, Suzanne (1891-1980) and Jacqueline (1896-1992).
