= Johan Asplund =

Swedish sociologist (1937–2018)

Johan Asplund (May 19, 1937 – November 13, 2018) was a Swedish sociologist interested in social interaction and ethnomethodology. At present, his works are not widely translated from the original Swedish. Until his retirement, he held the chair of Sociology at Lund University.

Two of his most widely read books are "Det sociala livets elementära former" (1987, approximately "Elementary forms of social life"), in which he introduces his theory about humans as essentially "socially responsive" (socialt responsiva), and "Essä om Gemeinschaft och Gesellschaft" (1991, "Essay about Gemeinschaft and Gesellschaft"), in which he explains and discusses this concept, originally developed by the German sociologist Ferdinand Tönnies, 1887. Johan Asplund's writings on cities are summarized in English by Bo Gronlund in New Urban Theory.

== Bibliography ==
- Om mättnadsprocesser 1967
- Sociala egenskapsrymder 1968
- Om undran inför samhället 1970
- Om attitydbegreppets teoretiska status 1971
- En mycket fri tolkning av några teser i George Lukács historia och klassmedvetande 1971
- Inledning till strukturalismen 1973
- Bertillon och Holmes 1976
- Teorier om framtiden 1979
- Socialpsykologiska studier 1980
- Tid, rum, individ och kollektiv 1983
- Ett ostämt piano är hemskt 1984
- Om hälsningsceremonier, mikromakt och asocial pratsamhet 1987
- Det sociala livets elementära former 1987
- Rivaler och syndabockar 1989
- Essä om Gemeinschaft och Gesellschaft 1991
- Storstäderna och det forteanska livet 1992
- Avhandlingens språkdräkt 2002
- Genom huvudet 2002
- Hur låter åskan? 2003
- Angående Raymond Chandler 2004
- Munnens socialitet och andra essäer 2006
- Ord för ord 2017

== Prizes and awards ==
- Kellgrenpriset 1997
- John Landquists pris 2003
