= L'Union nationale des femmes =

French conservative feminist journal (1927–1964)

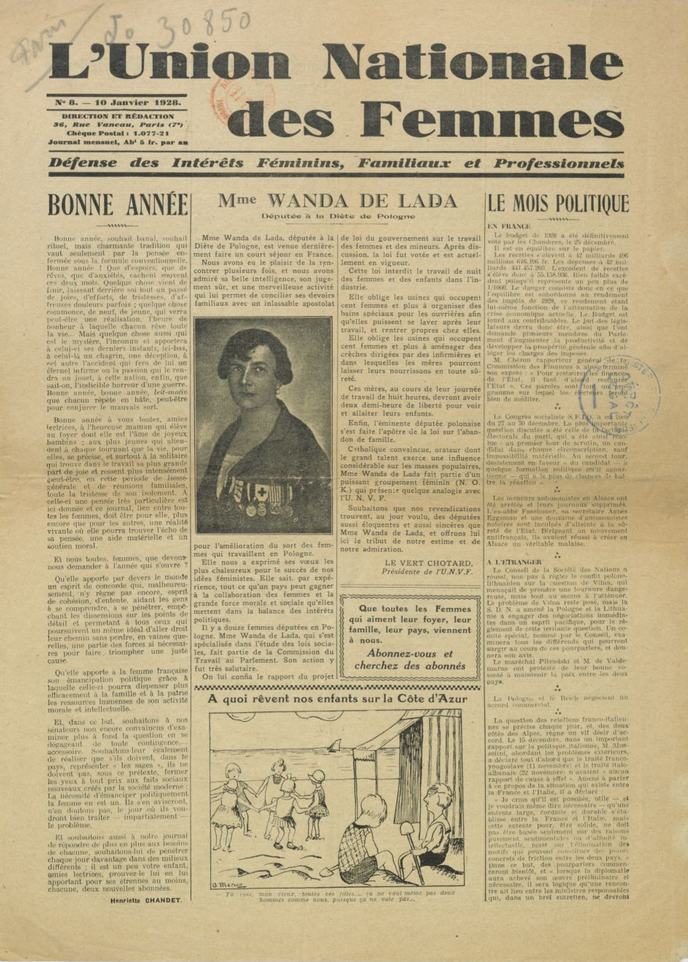
L'Union nationale des femmes (10 January 1928)

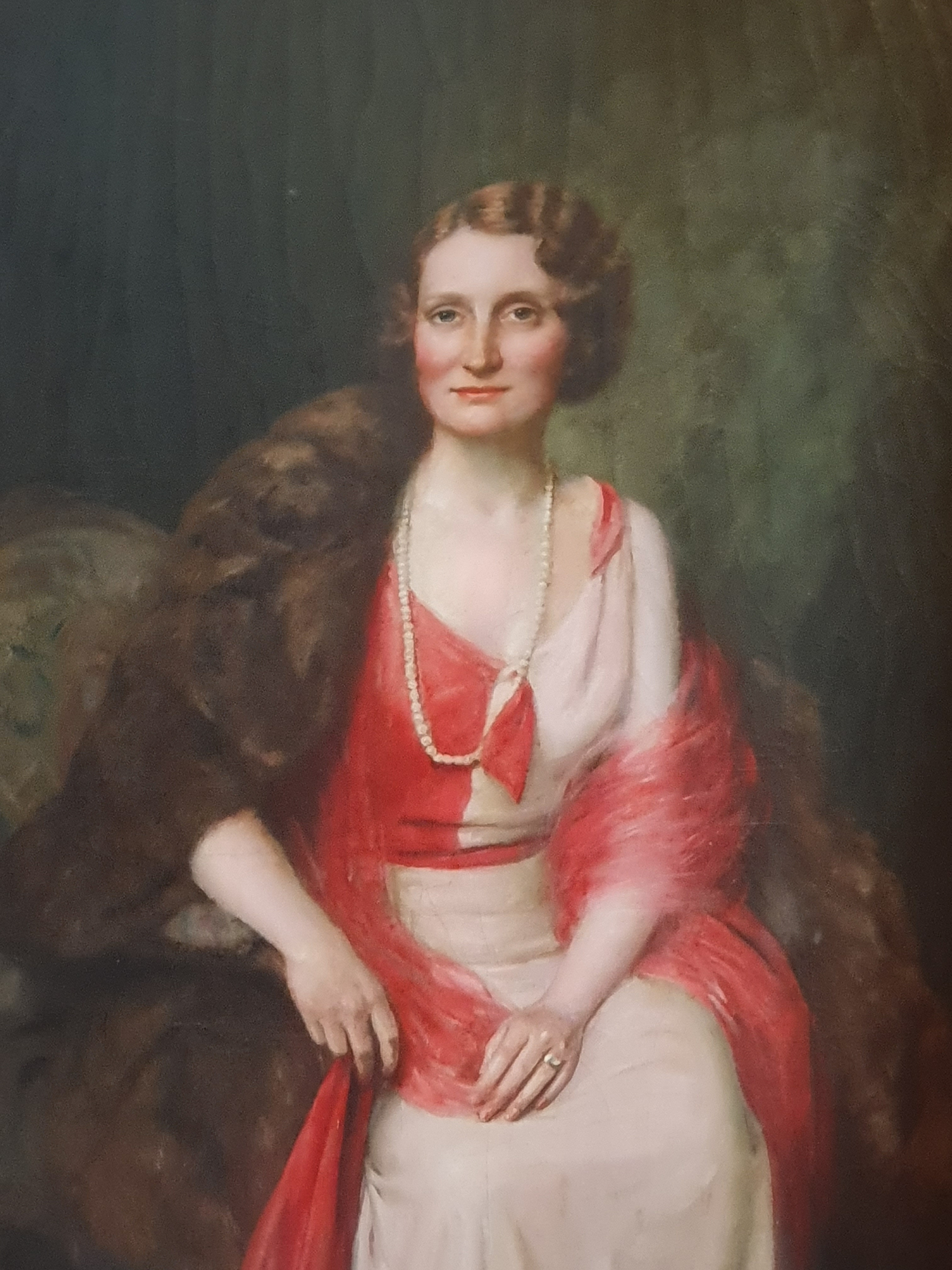
Portrait of the founder, Duchess Edmée de La Rochefoucauld

L'Union nationale des femmes (National Union of Women) was a conservative French-language feminist journal published quarterly in Paris by the Union nationale pour le vote des femmes (National Union for the Vote for Women) (UNVF). The periodical was founded by Duchess Edmée de La Rochefoucauld in 1927 and ran until 1964.

The journal advocated for women's right to vote and equal rights, in order to better defend the interests of mothers and families. The UNVF advocated for "the defense of women's family and professional interests", and was influenced by social Catholicism, as well as being in the orbit of several right-wing parties, including Action Libérale, chaired by the Duchess' husband, Duke Jean François Marie de La Rochefoucauld.

== Contributing journalists ==
- Nathalie Argypoulo
- Georgette Barbizet
- Sylvie de Bertier de Sauvigny
- Suzanne Bertillon
- Germaine Blondin
- Liliane A. Bruneau
- Henriette Chandet
- Suzanne Desternes
- Marie-Louise des Garets
- Thérèse Harvier
- Marie-Thérèse Moreau
- Edmée de La Rochefoucauld
- Mme Ronald Seydoux
- Mme David le Suffleur
- Hélène de Suzannet
- Louise Zeys
