= Henriette Chandet =

French journalist and historian

Henriette Chandet (2 November 1901 - 8 June 1989) was a French Catholic feminist, columnist, and historian, born in Paris on 2 November 1901. She served as the director of the periodical L'Union nationale des femmes (National Union for the Vote for Women), the organ of the Union Nationale pour le Vote des Femmes (UNVF). Chandet was a recipient of the Prix d’Académie (1956), the Prix Broquette-Gonin (philosophy) (1958), and the Prix Broquette-Gonin (literature) (1962). She died in Massaguel on 8 June 1989.

== Awards and honours ==
- 1956, Prix d’Académie (La vie privée de l’Impératrice Eugénie)
- 1958, Prix Broquette-Gonin (philosophy) (Louis, Prince impérial)
- 1962, Prix Broquette-Gonin (literature) (Napoléon III, homme du XXe.)
- The Henriette Chandet rose in orange-coral hues, is named in her honour.

== Selected works ==
=== Books ===
- La Merveilleuse aventure du général de Gaulle: racontée aux petits Français par Henriette Chandet. Dessins de Michel Haguenauer. Suivie de l'aventure du Général de Lattre de Tassigny et du Général Leclerc (Éditions Gutenberg, 1945) (text)
- Le vrai roman de la dame aux camélias: roman (Ed. de Savoie, 1945) (text)
- Le procès Maurras (Éditions de Savoie, 1945) (text)
- Cinq personnes sans alibi: roman policier (L. Sezanne, 1945) (text)
- Sophie Dawes: roman (Les Éditions des quatre-vents, 1946) (text)
- La Duchesse de Praslin (Éditions Gutenberg (Impr. réunies), 1946) (text)
- Les portes sont murées (A. Fayard, 1948) (text)
- La vie privée de l'impératrice Eugénie (with Suzanne Desternes; Hachette, 1955) (text)
- La Vida privada de la emperatriz Eugenia (with Suzanne Desternes; Vergara, 1956) (text)
- Louis, Prince Impérial, 1856-1879 (with Suzanne Desternes; Hachette, 1957) (text)
- Eugenie, Weltdame und Kaiserin (La vie privee de l'impéatrice Eugénie, dt. - [Uebertr.] v. Kurt Wagenseil (1957) (text)
- Cuisine sans frontières (with Suzanne Desternes; Pierre Horay, 1959) (text)
- L'Algérie sans mensonge (with Raymond Cartier & Hubert de Segonzac; Hachette, 1960) (text)
- Napoléon III: homme du XXe siècle (with Suzanne Desternes; Hachette, 1961) (text)
- Cocina de urgencia (with Suzanne Desternes; General Fabril, 1961) (text)
- Les recettes de Madame Express (Horay, 1961) (text)
- Maximilien et Charlotte (with Suzanne Desternes; Librairie académique Perrin, 1964) (text)
- L'impératrice Eugénie intime (with Suzanne Desternes; Hachette, 1964) (text)
- Maximiliano y Carlota (with Suzanne Desternes; DIANA, 1968) (text)
- La Malibran et Pauline Viardot (with Suzanne Desternes & Alice Viardot; Fayard, 1969) (text)
- Cuisine d'urgence (with Suzanne Desternes; P. Horay, 1973) (text)
- On l'appelait la Dame aux camélias (Presses de la Cité, 1973) (text)
- S.M. Bao Daï, empereur d'Annam, l'un des plus jeunes, l'un des plus modernes souverains du monde (undated) (text)

=== Articles ===
- "Le roman de la Princesse Gauloise" (in Paris match, 8 August 1953) (text)
