= Suzanne Bertillon =

French decorator, journalist and resistance fighter

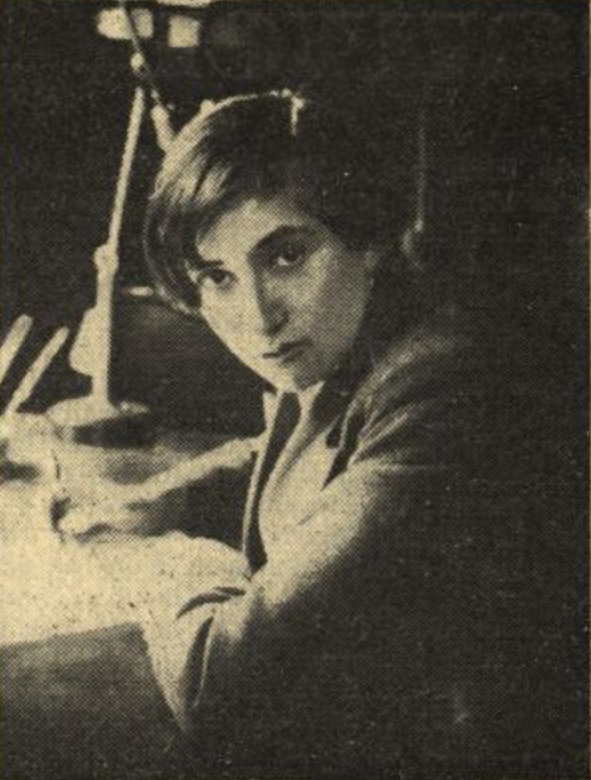
Suzanne Bertillon ( l'Union nationale des femmes, 1 June 1945)

Suzanne Bertillon (23 June 1891 – 8 October 1980) was a prominent French figure before and during World War II, whose various roles included decorator, journalist, lecturer, and resistance fighter. She was a laureate of the Resistance Medal, the Croix de Guerre 1939–1945, the Cross of the Legion of Honour, and the Medal of Freedom with bronze palm.

== Early life ==
Suzanne Marguerite Bertillon was born in Paris, 23 June 1891. She was the granddaughter of Louis Bertillon, physician and statistician. She was one of two daughters of Dr. Jacques Bertillon, also head of the municipal statistics department of Paris, and his wife, also a physician.

== Career ==
From 1919 onwards, she exhibited her painted and decorated fabrics (clothing and upholstery) in Paris.

In 1924, along with her sister Jacqueline, a lawyer, Suzanne appeared on an electoral list led by a woman of letters, Mme. Aurel, at a time when women were not yet entitled to vote.

In the company of young men and women from the Ecole des Beaux-Arts, she traveled to the Soviet Union in the early 1930s, and later recounted her impressions at conferences in France and Switzerland, (Note: S. Bertillon gave a conference in Nantes and also spoke to the Ukrainian Studies Association.) as well as in the right-wing daily Le Matin, in articles published in 1932 entitled "Anticommunistes du monde entier, unissez-vous!" At the time, she was close to Henri Bourgoin's xenophobic and anti-communist "Association des travailleurs français", opposed to class struggle and Marxism, and spoke at several of its meetings between 1932 and 1934, mentioning in particular her stay in the USSR. In 1932, she made a violent attack on Léon Blum in the association's periodical, in the name of defending France's security against German pretensions. The short-lived association was renamed the "Confédération générale des travailleurs français" in 1934, and Bertillon briefly served as its general secretary.

She traveled to Germany in January and February 1933, when Hitler came to power on January 30, and brought back alarmist impressions and reflections, published in Le Matin. She also gave lectures on her trip.

Bertillon's two August 1933 articles in Le Matin on the plight of the famine-stricken Ukrainian people were the first in France to alert readers to the scale of the famine in this Soviet territory. She gave lectures on the USSR for the Jeunesses Patriotes in the French provinces.

In December 1935 and January 1936, she was the special correspondent in Berlin for another right-wing daily, Léon Bailby's Le Jour. Le Matin sent Bertillon to Spain after the Popular Front's electoral victory in February 1936. Her anti-communist report was entitled "Spain under the reign of fear". In 1937, she published her reports on Nazi Germany in La Revue hebdomadaire.

In 1936, Bertillon received a 15-day suspended prison sentence for incitement to murder, following violent remarks made against members of the government at a conference in Meurthe-et-Moselle. The following year, on appeal, she received a one-month suspended prison sentence for threatening to kill two Popular Front figures, radical-socialist Édouard Herriot and socialist Joseph Paul-Boncour, during a political conference of the Parti National Populaire (the new name for the JP) in Nice in 1936. A member of the French Popular Party (PPF), she took responsibility for her words, and in the party's periodical, accused the Communists and Léon Blum's government of being responsible for her conviction. She then gave lectures for the PPF, and for royalist circles in France and Switzerland. In June 1938, this nationalist called for firmness against Germany over the Sudetenland and Czechoslovakia question.

=== World War II ===
In 1941, Bertillon wrote the biography of her uncle, the criminologist, Alphonse Bertillon. In that same year, under the Occupation, Bertillon headed the foreign newspaper censorship department at the Ministry of Information, with the support of her uncle René Gillouin. It was in this context that she came into contact with Swiss and American journalists. In particular, she was in contact with Virginia Hall, who, under cover of her status as Vichy correspondent for the New York Post, worked for the British and then American secret services. In 1943, she founded and ran the Hi-Hi resistance network with Louis Marin, a friend of her uncle Alphonse. In the Bouches-du-Rhône region, she turned to her cousins and a friend to organize and recruit in two areas, Marseille and the Rhône delta. Her network was also present in Auvergne (Puy-de-Dôme, Allier, and Haute-Loire) and Var. She came into contact with Edmond Locard, who provided her with information between March and October 1943. (Note: Frappa Amos, Edmond Locard, and the School for Advanced Studies in the Social Sciences, 2020:— « Après avoir rédigé une recension des plus favorables de la biographie de Bertillon, Locard rencontre de nouveau Suzanne pour un tout autre projet : rejoindre le réseau de résistance Hi-Hi. Alors qu’elle travaillait au ministère de l’Information à Vichy, s’occupant de la presse étrangère, la nièce de Bertillon s’était liée d’amitié avec Virginia Hall, la correspondante du New York Post œuvrant en fait pour le S.O.E. britannique. Dès l’invasion de la zone sud, Suzanne avait tenté d’intégrer les services secrets américains. De fil en aiguille, elle s’était ainsi rapprochée de l’ancien sous-préfet Pierre Truc, fondateur du réseau Nouquette en juillet 1940. La chaîne Hi-Hi avait émergé à partir de ce réseau en janvier 1943 avec Suzanne à sa tête. D’ampleur modeste et subordonnée à l’O.S.S. de Barcelone, ses ramifications s’étendaient jusqu’à Toulon. Favorable aux Alliés, Locard accepte donc de fournir des renseignements entre mars et octobre 1943, livrant par exemple des détails sur la flotte furtive allemande naviguant sur le Rhône et la Saône. Se sachant étroitement surveillé par la Gestapo, il conseille à son amie – aux multiples pseudonymes tels que Camille, Oncle Sébastien, Claude Montsoreau ou encore Christine – de cesser ses visites au laboratoire de police, consigne qu’elle respectera jusqu’à la Libération. » (After writing a most favorable review of Bertillon's biography, Locard meets Suzanne again for a completely different project: joining the Hi-Hi resistance network. While working at the Ministry of Information in Vichy, handling the foreign press, Bertillon's niece had become friends with Virginia Hall, the New York Post correspondent actually working for the S.O.E. British. As soon as the southern zone was invaded, Suzanne tried to join the American secret services. One thing led to another and she became closer to the former sub-prefect Pierre Truc, founder of the Nouquette network in July 1940. The Hi-Hi channel had emerged from this network in January 1943 with Suzanne at its head. Modest in scale and subordinate to the O.S.S. from Barcelona, its ramifications extended as far as Toulon. Favorable to the Allies, Locard therefore agreed to provide information between March and October 1943, providing for example details on the German stealth fleet sailing on the Rhône and the Saône. Knowing he was being closely monitored by the Gestapo, he advised his friend – with multiple pseudonyms such as Camille, Uncle Sébastien, Claude Montsoreau and Christine – to stop her visits to the police laboratory, an instruction that she respected until the Liberation.))

=== Post-war ===
After World War II, she collaborated with L'Union nationale des femmes. She continued to give conferences, for example, in 1950, in favor of the Marshall Plan.

== Death ==
Suzanne Bertillon died 8 October 1980, in Montgeron.

== Awards and honours ==
After the war, she received the Resistance Medal, the Croix de Guerre 1939–1945 and the Cross of the Legion of Honour. In May 1947, like other resistance fighters, she received the Medal of Freedom with bronze palm, awarded by the United States, for exceptional services rendered to the Office of Strategic Services (OSS), April 1943 to July 1944.
