= Flower Town, Kentucky =

Unincorporated community in Kentucky, United States

Flower Town
- Unincorporated community
- Location within the state of Kentucky Flower Town (the United States)
- Coordinates: 38°47′30″N 84°20′47″W
- Country: United States
- State: Kentucky
- County: Pendleton
- Elevation: 522 ft (159 m)
- Time zone: UTC-5 (Eastern (EST))
  - Summer (DST): UTC-4 (EST)
- GNIS feature ID: 2558271

Flower Town was an unincorporated community in Pendleton County, Kentucky, United States.
