= Dunno =

Character from the books of Nikolay Nosov

- The Adventures of Dunno and his Friends character
- The Adventures of Dunno and his Friends book cover
- Created by: Nikolay Nosov
- Based on: Work of Palmer Cox and Our Gang film series

In-universe information
- Home: Flower Town

Dunno, or Know-Nothing (Russian: Незнайка, Neznayka that is Don'tknowka (ka - the Russian suffix here for drawing up the whole name in a cheerful form); from the Russian phrase "не знаю" ("ne znayu", I don't know) is a character created by Soviet children's writer Nikolay Nosov. The idea of the character comes from the books of Palmer Cox. as well as the film series Our Gang.

Dunno, recognized by his bright blue hat, canary-yellow trousers, orange shirt, and green tie, is the title character of Nosov's trilogy, The Adventures of Dunno and his Friends (1954), Dunno in Sun City (1958), and Dunno on the Moon (1965). There have been several movie adaptations of the books.

== Names ==
His names are translated differently in various languages:

- Albanian: Dinpak/Kokëboshi
- Arabic: الجاهل
- Azerbaijani: Bilməz
- Bulgarian: Незнайко
- Bengali: আনাড়ি
- Czech: Neználek
- German: Nimmerklug
- Estonian: Totu
- Hebrew: בורבורי
- Hindi: Najanu
- Hungarian: Nemtudomka
- Armenian: Անգետիկը
- Georgian: ნეზნაიკა
- Lithuanian: Nežiniukas
- Latvian: Nezinītis
- Polish: Nieumiałek
- Romanian: Habarnam
- Russian: Незнайка
- Slovak: Nevedko
- Slovene: Neznalček
- Sinhala: වැඩ බැරි දාස, romanized: Wada Bari Daasa
- Spanish: Nosabenada
- Ukrainian: Незнайко
- Uzbek: Bilmasvoy
- Vietnamese: Mít Đặc
- simplified Chinese: 小无知; traditional Chinese: 小無知

== Plot summaries ==
The three fairy tale novels follow the adventures of the little fictional childlike people living in "Flower Town". They are described to be sized like "medium cucumbers", a quality that has earned them the name "shorties" or "mites". All fruits and vegetables growing in Flower Town are, however, their regular size, so the Shorties invent sophisticated methods of growing and harvesting them. In Nosov's universe, each shorty occupies his/her own niche in the community and is named accordingly.

=== The Adventures of Dunno and his Friends ===
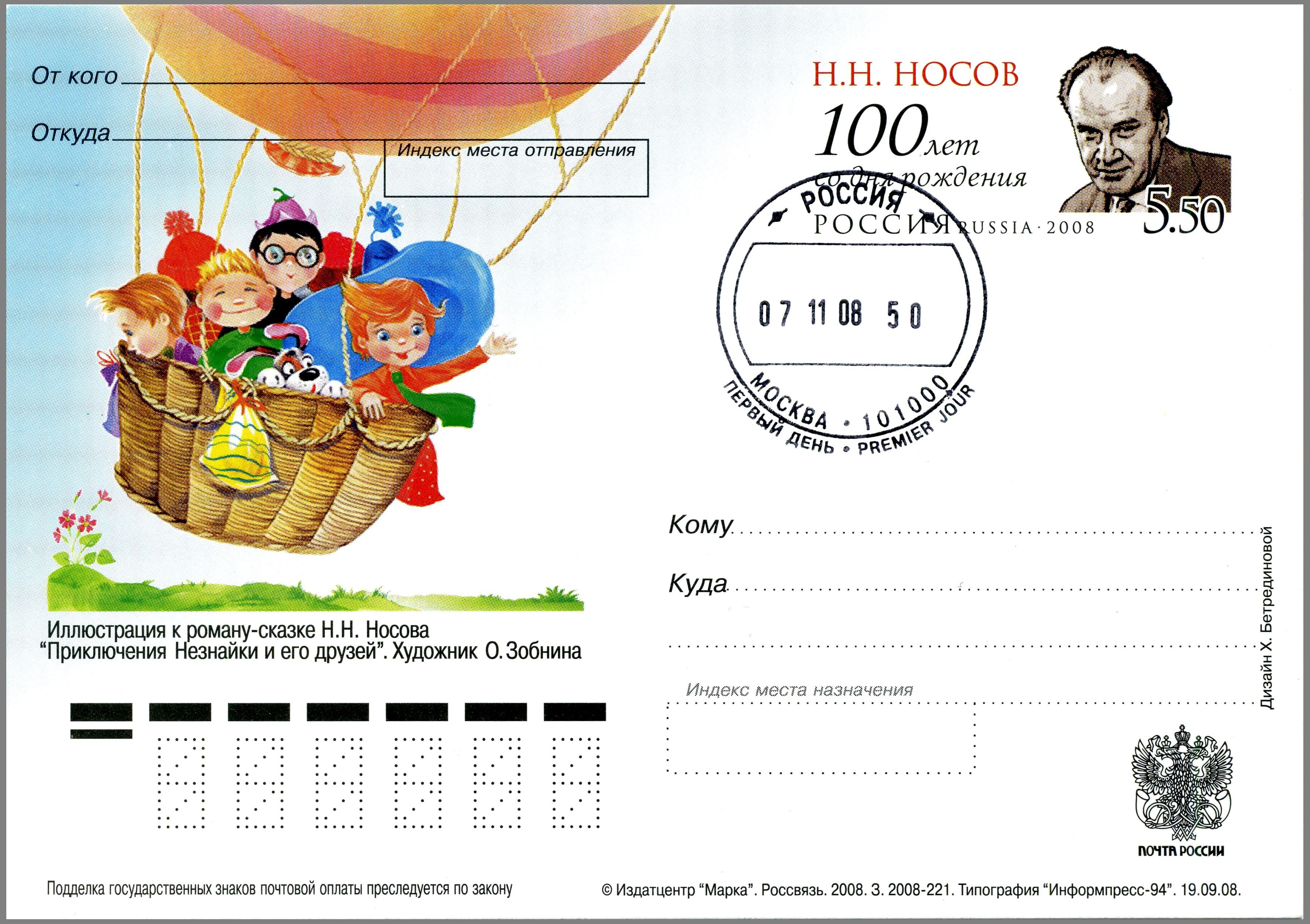
The illustration for The Adventures of Dunno and his Friends. Postal card, Russia, 2008.

In Flower Town, Dunno gets into heaps of trouble. First, he becomes convinced that the sun is falling and manages to scare half the town before Doono, Dunno's brainy antithesis (his name is derived from the Russian "знаю", I know) clears everything up. Then he proceeds to try music, art, and poetry, but his unorthodox endeavors only irritate his friends, and he is forced to quit. Next, ignoring the warnings of Swifty, Dunno crashes Bendum and Twistum's car into the Cucumber River and ends up in the hospital. He then gets into a fight with his best friend Gunky for not ending his friendships with the girl-shorties Pee-Wee and Tinkle (generally, boy-Mites did not like girl-Mites, and vice versa).

Doono proposes to build a hot air balloon and go on an adventure. He and his friends begin extracting rubber, weaving the basket, and making emergency parachutes out of dandelions. A large rubber balloon is then inflated, fastened to the basket, and filled with hot air. The parachutes and other supplies are loaded, and sixteen seats are accommodated for. Everyone helps with preparations except for Dunno, who is too busy bossing everyone around and providing useless advice. The day of the departure comes, and Doono, Dunno, and fourteen other Mites come on board. Shot takes with him his dog, Dot. By this time, half the town still does not believe the balloon will be able to fly, but the balloon successfully rises off the ground, and all the shorties of Flower Town cheer. Gunky waves to Dunno from the ground but Dunno shuns him.

The balloon eventually crashes near the Greenville, inhabited only by girl-Mites (boy-Mites had left for the Kite Town where they can carry out freely their boyish activities), who took balloonists to the hospital to care for them. As Doono (who escaped from the balloon by parachute before the crash) is absent, Dunno describes himself to girl-Mites as balloon inventor and boy-Mites' leader. When he visits the hospital, he talks boy-Mites into supporting his version of facts, in exchange promising to help them out of hospital as soon as possible. Soon it became clear that the only boy-Mite who has to be cured is Shot (who meanwhile lost Dot that has run back to the Flower Town), but the hospital physician, Dr. Honeysuckle, does not want to take all the other boy-Mites together out because she thinks that boy-Mites cause a lot of trouble, so the boy-Mites are taken out in pairs. After being taken out, the boy-Mites help girl-Mites to gather harvest, and Bendum and Twistum go to the Kite Town to repair girl-Mites' car. Then Bendum and Twistum return to Greenville, and some Kite Town dwellers join them and also gather harvest, including Nails who used to be a hooligan. With the time, Doono finds the other Mites, Dunno's lies are discovered and he's mocked by boy-Mites, but consoled by girl-Mites. Dunno becomes friends with the girl-Mite Cornflower, and after returning home, Shot finds Dot, and Dunno makes peace with Gunky, becomes best friends with Pee-Wee, improves his reading skills, and learns cursive writing to correspond with Cornflower.

=== Dunno in Sun City ===
Dunno continues his self-studies: he learns grammar and arithmetic and begins learning physics, but physics bores him, and he begins to meet with his best friend Pee-Wee, and then both read fairy-tales. Dunno dreams of a magic wand, and Pee-Wee says she has read in one book that one may get a magic wand from a wizard for three good actions, but one who wants to get the magic wand should not think of a reward. After the meeting, Dunno tries to do good actions, but on the first day he does too many bad actions, namely quarrels with the other Mites of his house. On the following day, Dunno does only good actions, but a wizard does not come to him. Pee-Wee explains that it is because Dunno thinks of a reward, namely the magic wand. During several months, Dunno does good actions and dreams of a magic wand but at the same time thinks getting it is unrealistic. But then in a sunny day after several days of rain Dunno, having forgotten about his dream, frees Dot from its kennel and meets an old man. Dunno protects the man from Dot's bite and asks whether Dot has not already bit him. Then the old man says he is a wizard and gives Dunno a magic wand. The wizard alerts Dunno that the magic wand will not work after three bad actions.

After receiving the magic wand from the wizard, Dunno, Pee-Wee, and their accidental acquaintance Pachkulya Pyostrenky (who does not like to wash himself and never gets surprised at anything) wish for a car and go on a road trip to Sun City. Because of the magic wand, Dunno gains a skill of conducting the car without having studied it. During their journey, they see many technological marvels like futuristic cars, bizarre architecture, televisions that can communicate with you, computerized chess players, etc. The name "Sun City" comes from the fact that all days in the city are sunny because of cloud seeding. However, the travellers also run into some trouble in the city. On the very day Dunno arrives to Sun City, he quarrels with a Mite called Listik and uses his magic wand to turn him into a donkey. On the following day, Dunno reads in a newspaper that Listik is lost but a donkey mysteriously appeared in Sun City and is taken into the city zoo. Then Dunno goes to the zoo and then turns two donkeys and a hinny into Mites, being not sure which one of them is Listik. Unfortunately, the donkeys and the hinny turned into Mites become hooligans, and some other Sun City Mites become hooligans too, thinking it is a new trend. When the Mites Chubchik and Yorshik water a Sun City garden with a hose, one of the former donkeys, Pegasik, begins to spray water on Mites, and Dunno wants to take away the hose. Then two policemen, called Svistulkin and Karaulkin, see the accident and put Dunno into a police station. Dunno uses his magic wand to destroy the station, and Svistulkin gets a concussion because of falling of a brick on him. Then Dunno, Pee-Wee, and Pachkulya Pyostrenky continue the journey, and Svistulkin goes home but comes to a wrong flat inhabited by two Mites called Shutilo and Korzhik. After Shutilo and Korzhik have come, Svistulkin goes home but mistakenly wears Korzhik's jacket with his driver licence in its pocket. Then Svistulkin stumbles over a rope put on the sidewalk by the former donkeys and hinny and gets concussed again. Having lost conscience, he is taken away to the Sun City hospital, where he is mistaken for Korzhik. Newspapers state that Svistulkin is lost. When Svistulkin gets healthy, doctors of the hospital think he is still ill because he says he is Svistulkin; but soon the doctors trust him after having met with the real Korzhik. But the doctors still do not discharge Svistulkin from the hospital because he says something about "a wizard in yellow trousers" (meaning Dunno), and the doctors think it is a true fantasy.

Trouble in Sun City caused by the hooligans continues, and then Dunno realises that no one of the former donkeys and hinny is Listik, so he goes once again to the zoo to find the real Listik. In the zoo, Dunno is told that the information in the newspaper was mistaken and Listik is in the Sun City circus. Then Dunno decides to tease a monkey, and the monkey takes away his magic wand. After the zoo is closed because the night has come, Dunno and Pachkulya Pyostrenky dare to climb over the zoo fence, but in the dark they come to a lion's cage instead of the monkey's cage. On the following day, Dunno finds his magic wand in the zoo, but it ceases to work. Then the wizard comes to Dunno and explains him that the wand does not work because of three bad deeds: turning Listik into a donkey, turning the donkeys and the hinny into Mites, and teasing the monkey.

Dunno asks the wizard whether a wish can come true without the magic wand. The wizard says that a wish can come true if it is good. Then Dunno wishes that the Sun City return to its previous state; Pee-Wee wished to return to Flower Town; and Pachkulya Pyostrenky wished to be clean without needing to wash himself. The wizard says that Pachkulya Pyostrenky will feel good only after washing himself.

Svistulkin is discharged from the hospital; Listik is again a Mite; the donkeys and the hinny become what they were and return to the zoo.

Dunno, Pee-Wee, and Pachkulya Pyostrenky return to Flower Town. Pachkulya Pyostrenky goes home, and Dunno and Pee-Wee discuss the Sun City and its futuristic utopia.

=== Dunno on the Moon ===
Doono discovers that his Moon rock (that he obtained from his previous travel to the Moon) creates a no gravity zone when interacting with a magnetic field. He uses this knowledge to build a rocket ship that will go to the Moon much more easily because of being virtually weightless. However, Dunno and Roly-Poly are not allowed to go; Dunno, because of his undisciplined behavior, and Roly-Poly, because of his inability to cope with non-gravity effects and excessive food consumption. The night before the rocket launch, Dunno and Roly-Poly sneak into the ship and accidentally launch the rocket.

When they arrive on the Moon, Dunno and Roly-Poly become separated and Dunno falls through a cave and discovers a whole separate society of mites living inside the Moon. However, unlike on Earth, these mites do not have "giant food" (that is, their fruit and vegetables are sized in proportion to the mites, rather than to normal humans like on Earth). The Moon society is a corrupt capitalistic state: the millionaires control all the factories and squander their money away on unnecessary luxuries, the police are violent, corrupt, and stupid, everyday citizens struggle to survive and live in rat infested barracks.

Dunno gets thrown into jail for not having money to pay for his meal at a restaurant and is mistaken for a wanted criminal by the stupid police officers. In jail he meets Miga - a fast-talking schemer, and Kozlik - a poor, gentle worker. Upon getting released from jail, Miga introduces Kozlik and Dunno to Zhulio - another con man, and the four decide to start a company selling stocks to raise money to get "giant seeds" from Dunno's rocket ship and plant them on the Moon. The stocks sell well and soon the four friends have much money. However, some of the local millionaire businessmen are worried that giant food will mean that poor workers can get richer and the millionaires may lose money. Their leader, Spruts, convinces Miga and Zhulio to steal the money and run leaving Dunno and Kozlik jobless and penniless.

Meanwhile, Roly-Poly finds the same cave and also goes inside the Moon. However, he quickly discovers salt and opens his own business making and selling it (salt was unknown for Moon inhabitants). He gets rich but then goes bankrupt when the price of salt becomes too low because of a dumping scheme. Then Roly-Poly becomes an average worker.

Dunno and Kozlik work odd jobs but are still starving and living in poverty in a rat infested basement. Kozlik gets bit by a rat and becomes sick. Just then, Dunno gets a job as a dog nanny for a rich woman, Mrs Minoga ("lamprey"), and makes enough money for a doctor for Kozlik who slowly recovers, but Mrs. Minoga finds out that Dunno took her dogs to the rat infested basement and fires him. Dunno and Kozlik then end up living on the street. Since Kozlik has lost his hat and Dunno lost his shoes they are breaking the law and get sent to Fool's Island which has a toxic atmosphere that turns all the people there into sheep which are then sheared for their wool.

Later Dunno's friends come to Moon with giant seeds, which results in elimination of poverty and establishment of a communism-like economical system and saves Dunno and Kozlik from Fool's Island.

== Characters ==
=== Flower Town dwellers ===
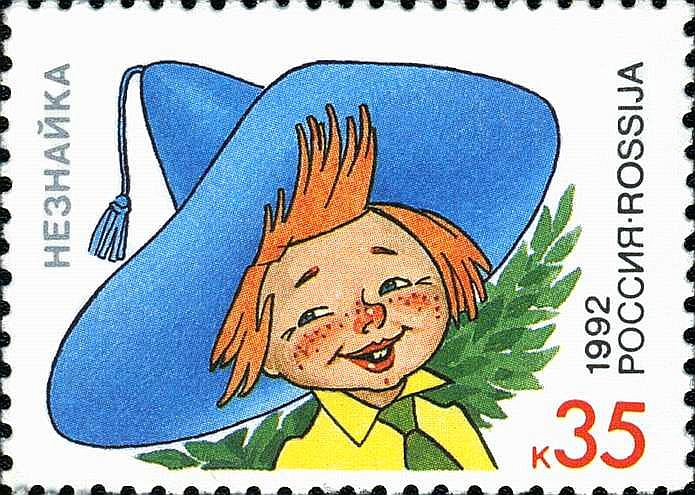
Russian stamp with the image of Dunno (1992)

Named for its abundance of flowers, all streets are named after flowers as well. The Flower Town is located by the Cucumber River, on the shore of which many cucumbers grow. Here boy-shorties and girl-shorties live together, but often have trouble getting along.

==== Dunno's house ====
Dunno's house is inhabited by sixteen boy-shorties:

- Dunno (Незнайка "Neznayka", from Russian "не знаю", "I don't know") - the title character of the trilogy and the most infamous personality in Flower Town. As an anti-hero, this boy-shorty is both ignorant, lazy, rude, and conceited and at the same time curious, kind, enterprising, and unbelievably lucky. He is highly reminiscent of the popular Russian folk hero Ivan the Fool, a flawed young man who always manages to come out on top. He also resembles Khlestakov of Nikolai Gogol, and Alfalfa from Our Gang
- Doono (Знайка "Znayka ", from "знаю", "I know") - a boy-shorty scientist, the smartest of the boy-shorties, often adopts the leadership role. The story's version of Waldo
- Bendum (Винтик "Vintik", or "little bolt") and Twistum (Шпунтик, from "little peg") - boy-shorty mechanics
- Trills (Гусля "Guslya", from "гусли", or "gusli") - a boy-shorty musician
- Blobs (Тюбик "Tyubik ", or "tube") - a boy-shorty painter
- Swifty (Торопыжка "Toropyzhka", from "торопиться", or "to hurry") - a boy-shorty who is always in a hurry
- Scatterbrain (Растеряйка "Rasteryayka", from "растерять", or "to lose") - a boy-shorty who always loses and forgets things
- Dr. Pillman (Доктор Пилюлькин " Doktor Pilyul'kin", from "пилюля", or "pill") - a boy-shorty physician
- Roly-Poly (Пончик "Ponchik", or "doughnut") - a very chubby boy-shorty who likes to eat sweets
- Treacly-Sweeter (Сиропчик "Siropchik", or "little syrup") - a very chubby boy-shorty who likes to drink carbonated water with syrup
- Shot (Пулька "Pul'ka", from "пуля", "bullet") - a boy-shorty hunter
  - Dot (Булька "Bul'ka", from "бульдог", "бультерьер", or "bulldog", "bull terrier") - Shot's dog. The story's version of Pete the Dog
- Grumps (Ворчун "Vorchun", from "ворчать", "to grumble") - a boy-shorty who always grumbles and complains
- Mums (Молчун "Molchun", from "молчать", "to be silent") - a boy-shorty who is always quiet
- P'raps (Авоська "Avos'ka", from "авось", "perhaps" [colloquial]) and Prob'ly (Небоська, from "небось", "probably" [colloquial]) - boy-shorties, adventure lovers

==== Other Flower Town dwellers ====
- Gunky (Гунька "Gun'ka") - a boy-shorty, Dunno's best friend
- Pee-Wee (Кнопочка "Knopochka", or "little button") - a girl-shorty who becomes best friends with Dunno
- Daisy (Ромашка "Romashka", or "camomile") - a girl-shorty
- Posey (Цветик "Tsvetik", or "bloomer") - a boy-shorty poet
- Tinkle (Мушка "Mushka", from "муха", or "fly" [insect]) - a girl-shorty
- Glass-Eye (Стекляшкин "Steklyashkin", from "стекляшка", or "piece of glass") - a boy-shorty astronomer
- Sinker (Топик "Topik"), a boy-shorty
- Midge (Микроша "Mikrosha"), a boy-shorty
- Pachkulya Pyostrenky (Пачкуля Пёстренький, or "Motley Blotchy") - a boy-shorty who is covered in spots and stains (does not like to clean himself and has a unique ability to get dirty very quickly) and is never surprised at anything.
- Kapelka (Капелька, or "little drop") - a girl-shorty who cries when it rains

=== Greenville dwellers ===
Named for its abundance of trees, only girl-shorties live here.

- Honeysuckle (Медуница "Medunitsa", "lungwort") - a girl-shorty doctor, head of the Greenville hospital
- Cornflower (Синеглазка "Sineglazka", from "синие глаза", "blue eyes") - a pretty blue-eyed girl-shorty
- Snowdrop (Снежинка "Snezhinka", "snowflake") - a pretty fair-skinned girl-shorty
- Blossom (Самоцветик "Samotsvetik", from "самоцвет", "gem") - a girl-shorty poet
- Bunny (Заинька "Zain'ka", "little hare") and Chippy (Белочка, "Belochka" from "little squirrel") - girl-shorties with animals embroidered on their dresses
- Flitty (Стрекоза "Strekoza", "dragonfly") - a girl-shorty
- Minny (Галочка "Galochka", little jackdaw") - a girl-shorty with long black hair
- Winny (Ёлочка "Yolochka", little spruce") - a girl-shorty
- Margy (Маргаритка ""Margaritka", daisy") - a girl-shorty
- Fluff (Кубышка"Kubyshka", a kind of jar or water lily Nymphaea lutea) - a chubby girl-shorty
- Kitty (Кисонька "Kison'ka", "kitty") - a girl-shorty
- Birdie (Ласточка "Lastochka", "swallow" [bird]) - a girl-shorty, Kitty's friend
- Thistle (Соломка "Solomka", "little straw") - a smart girl-shorty who bred watermelons as well as other fruit
- Button (Пуговка "Pugovka", "button") - a girl-shorty

=== Kite Town dwellers ===
Named for its abundance of decorative kites, only boy-shorties live here.

- Nails (Гвоздик "Gvozdik", "little nail" [the metal kind]) - a boy-shorty who makes a lot of trouble
- Pretzel (Бублик "Bublik", "bagel") - a boy-shorty who drives a car
- Taps (Шурупчик "Shurupchik", "little screw") - a boy-shorty inventor
- Slick (Смекайло "Smekaylo", from "смекать", "to grasp quickly") - a pretentious boy-shorty writer

=== Sun City dwellers ===
Named for its perpetually sunny weather, it is a shorty utopia noted for its incredible technological advances.

- Kalachik (Калачик, sort of a larger bagel) - a boy-shorty farming equipment operator
- Listik (Листик, "small sheet of paper" or "a leaf") - a boy-shorty who loves to read and whom Dunno magically turned into a donkey
- Bukovka (Буковка, "little letter" [of the alphabet]) - a girl-shorty who loves to read, Listik's best friend
- Liliya (Лилия, "lily") - a girl-shorty, director of hotel Malvaziya
- Pegasik (Пегасик, "small Pegasus"), Brykun (Брыкун, from "брыкаться", "to kick"), and Kaligula (Калигула, "Caligula") - two donkeys and a hinny whom Dunno magically turned into boy-shorties
- Chubchik (Чубчик, "forelock") - a boy-shorty gardener
- Yorshik (Ёршик, "little ruff") - a boy-shorty, leader of the mass of passerby that Pegasik and Dunno sprayed with water
- Svistulkin (Свистулькин, from "свистулька", "clay whistle") and Karaulkin (Караулькин, from "to be on watch") - boy-shorty policemen
- Kubik (Кубик, "block, brick, little cube") - a boy-shorty architect
- Klyopka (Клёпка, from "rivet") - a boy-shorty engineer
- Fuksiya (Фуксия, "fuchsia") and Selyodochka (Селёдочка, "small herring") - girl-shorty scientists
- Nitochka (Ниточка, "little thread") - a girl-shorty modeller and chess player
- Karasik (Карасик, "little crucian") - a boy-shorty clothing factory worker and actor
- Igolochka (Иголочка, "little needle") - a girl-shorty clothing factory worker
- Figura (Фигура, "[chess] piece") - a boy-shorty Sun City chess champion
- Shutilo (Шутило, from "шутить", "to joke") - a boy-shorty who likes to joke
- Korzhik (Коржик, "shortcake") - a boy-shorty

=== Moon dwellers ===
Names of Moon dwellers and Moon cities resemble English, German, Italian and Spanish words amalgamated with Russian roots, e.g. Davilon (from давить — to suppress and Вавилон — Babylon), Grabenberg (from грабить — to rob and …berg — a typical German-like toponym), Brekhenville (from брехать — to lie or to bark (slang) and …ville — typical French-like toponym), Los Svinos (from свинья — a pig and Los.. — a typical Spanish-like toponym prefix, e.g. Los Angeles) etc.

Millionaires:

- Gryazing (Грязинг, from «грязь» — dirt)
- Spruts (Спрутс, from спрут — a giant octopus)
- Dubs (Дубс, from «дуб» — «oak», also «dumb man» in Russian)
- Zhading (Жадинг, from «жадина» — «greedy person»)
- Skuperfield (Скуперфильд, an amalgamated word from скупердяй — niggard and the English surname Copperfield)

Police and justice (whose names share the same suffix):

- Figl (Фигль) — a street patrol
- Migl (Мигль, from «фигли-мигли», figli-migli — shenanigans) — an investigator
- Drigl (Дригль) — a jailer
- Vrigl (Вригль, an amalgamated word from врать — to lie and the English surname Wrigley) — a judge

Thieves:

- Vikhor (Вихор, «forelock») and Striga (Стрига, from «стриженный» — cropped) — Dunno's jailmates
- Miga (Мига, from «миг» — a brief instant, or «мигать» — «to blink») — a cheater who meets Dunno in jail and with Zhulio's help talks him into founding a «Giant Plants Company»
- Zhulio (Жулио, an amalgamated word from жулик — a swindler, cheater, and the Spanish name Julio) — a firearms-store owner, Miga's friend
- Krabs (Крабс, from «краб» — «crab») — Sproots' personal assistant

Other citizens:

- Klops (Клопс, from «клоп» — a blood-sucking «bug» or «Heteroptera») — a rich Moon dweller whose property in Davilon Dunno first lands at
- Fiks (Фикс) and Feks (Фекс) — Klops' valets
- Kozlik (Козлик — a little goat) — a smart unemployed Moon dweller who quickly becomes Dunno's friend after they meet in jail
- Khaps (Хапс, from «хапать» — to grab) — a hotel owner in Davilon
- Sedenky (Седенький, from «седой» — «grey-haired») — a poor Moon dweller sent by peasants to buy a «Giant Plants Company» share
- Drakula (Дракула) — a rich Moon dweller, sea coast landlord who ruins Roly-Poly's salt business by increasing prices to access salt crystals on his land
- Minoga (Минога, «lamprey») — a rich Moon dweller who hires Dunno to care after her two dogs
- Piskarik (Пискарик, from «пескарь» — «gudgeon»), Leshchik (Лещик, from «лещ» — «bream»), Somik (Сомик, from «сом» — «catfish»), Sudachok (Судачок, from «судак» — «perch») — poor Moon dwellers, waterpark employees who befriend Roly-Poly after he lost his wealth and forced to work in a waterpark to earn his living

Peasants

- Kolosok (Колосок, «little ear» [for example, of rye])

=== Others ===
- Tsirkul (Циркуль, from "compass") - a lanky and very renowned traveling bicyclist from the city of Katigoroshkin (Катигорошкин, from «катить горох», to roll peas)
- Wizard (Волшебник "Volshebnik") - who gave Dunno a magic wand

== Themes and issues ==
An important characteristic of the Dunno trilogy is its heavily didactic nature. Nosov describes this as an effort to teach "honesty, bravery, camaraderie, willpower, and persistence" and discourage "jealousy, cowardice, mendacity, arrogance, and effrontery." Strong political undertones are also present. In addition to general egalitarianism and feminism, communist tendencies dominate the works. The first book takes the reader into a typical Soviet-like town, the second into a communist utopia, and the third into a capitalistic satire. Nosov's captivating and humorous literary style has made his ideologies accessible to children and adults alike.

At the same time, the Canadian anthropologist and critique of civilization and education Layla AbdelRahim emphasizes the anti-disciplinary and anti-totalitarian aspect of the Dunno trilogy.

Behind Dunno's apparent ignorance lies the exploring spirit that prefers learning through its own experience rather than acquiring institutionalized knowledge - in this regard Nosov points out that in everyday tasks Dunno succeeds perfectly. Dunno's encounters with Dr Pillman and Doono - who knows everything - reveal the oppressive nature of medical and scientific authority.

== Adaptations ==
- Dunno is Studying (Незнайка учится), a traditionally animated 1961 movie
- The Adventures of Dunno and his Friends (Приключения Незнайки и его друзей), a stop-motion 1972 movie in ten episodes
- Dunno in Sun City (Незнайка в Солнечном городе), a stop-motion 1977 movie in ten episodes
- Dunno From Our Neighborhood (Незнайка с нашего двора), a live-action 1983 movie
- Dunno on the Moon (Незнайка на Луне), a traditionally animated 1997 movie in six episodes
- Dunno on the Moon 2 (Незнайка на Луне - 2), a 1999 sequel to the 1997 movie in six episodes
- Dunno and Barrabass (Незнайка и Баррабасс), a traditionally animated 2004 movie that combines two previously unrelated characters into an original story.
