= Nikolay Nosov =

Soviet writer (1908–1976)

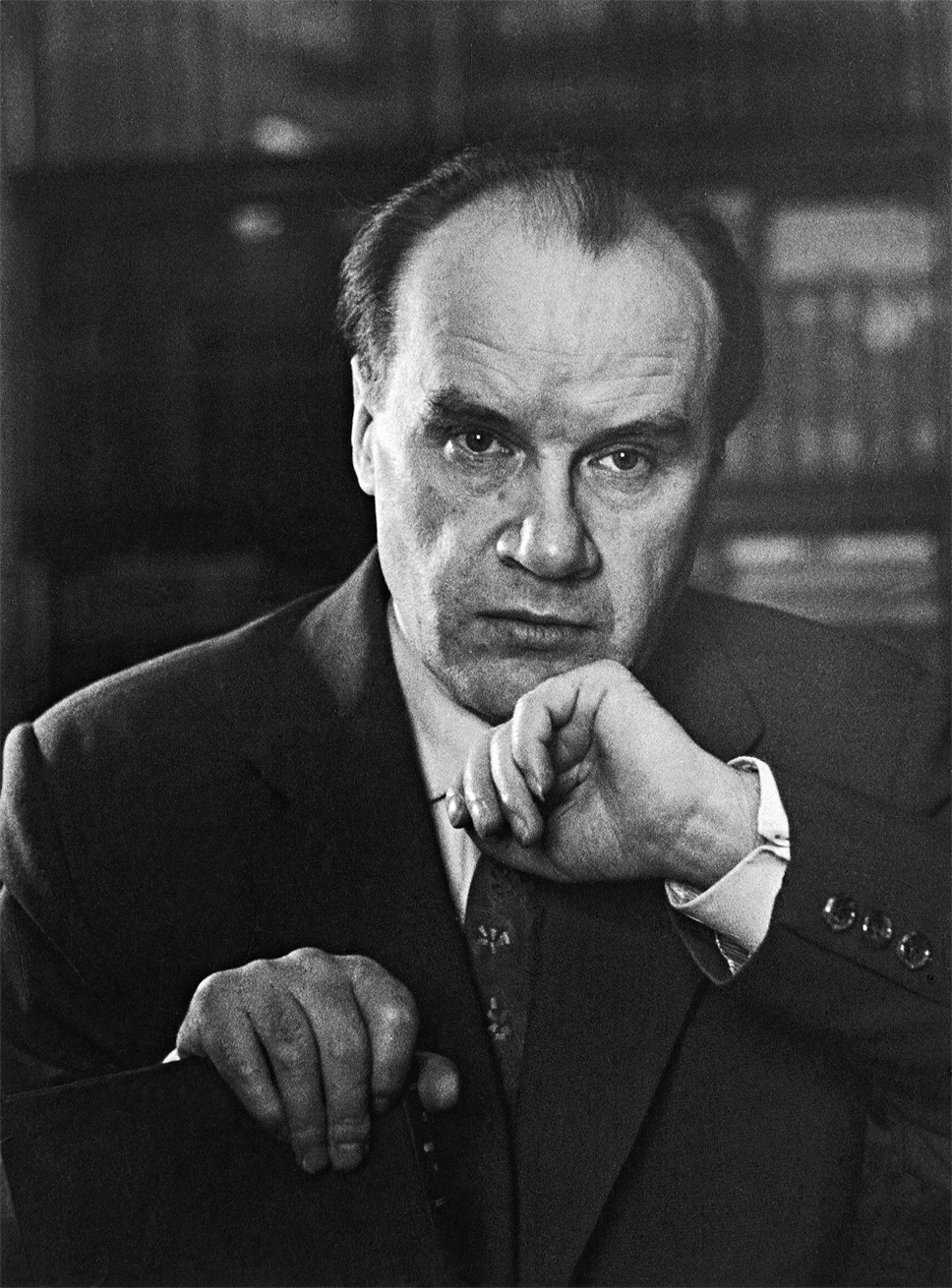
- Born: Nikolay Nikolayevich Nosov; 23 November 1908; Kyiv, Russian Empire (now Ukraine)
- Died: 26 July 1976 (aged 67); Moscow, RSFSR, Soviet Union
- Education: Gerasimov Institute of Cinematography
- Occupations: Writer, screenwriter
- Writing career
- Period: 1938–1976
- Genre: Children's literature
- Notable awards: Krupskaya State Prize of the RSFSR

Nikolay Nikolayevich Nosov (Russian: Николай Николаевич Носов, Ukrainian: Микола Миколайович Носов; 23 November [O.S. 10 November] 1908 – 26 July 1976) was a Soviet writer of children's literature, the author of a number of humorous short stories, a school novel, and the popular trilogy of fairy tale novels about the adventures of Dunno and his friends.

== Early life ==
He was born in a family of an estrada artist. From 1927 to 1929 he was a student of Kyiv Institute of Art, from where he moved to Gerasimov Institute of Cinematography, from which he graduated in 1932.

== Career ==
The literary debut of Nosov was in 1938. In 1932 – 1951 he worked as a producer of animated and educational films, including ones for the Red Army, having earned the Order of the Red Star in 1943.

In 1938 Nosov began to publish his stories, including Zatejniki (Russian: Затейники, roughly translates as Jokers); Alive Hat, Cucumbers, Miraculous Trousers, and Dreamers. These stories were published mainly in the magazine for children Murzilka and many of them make up the foundation of the Nosov's first collection Rat-tat-tat, 1945). Nosov introduced a new hero, naïve and sensible, naughty and curious fidget obsessed by craving for activities and always getting into unusual, often comic situations – into children's literature.

The most popular works became his stories for teenagers Merry Family (1949), The Kolya Sinitsyn's Diary (1950), Vitya Maleev at School and at Home (1951). This last one received Stalin Prize in 1952.

Long-term fame and love of readers were gained by his fairy stories about Dunno (Neznaika). The first of those is the fairy tale Vintik, Shpuntik and vacuum cleaner. Further the hero appeared in the famous trilogy consisting of fairy tale novels The Adventures of Dunno and His Friends (1953–1954), Dunno in Sun City (1958), and Dunno on the Moon (1964–1965).

The writer is also the author of an autobiographical work Story about My Friend Igor (1971–1972) and a memoirs narrative Mystery on a Well Bottom (1977).

== Death ==
He died in Moscow at the age of 67, and was buried at Kuntsevo Cemetery.

== Works ==
| Title | Year | Publisher | Notes |
|---|---|---|---|
| School Boys | 1954 | Foreign Language Publishing House, Moscow | |
| Dunno's Adventures Series | 1958 - 1990 | | 16 Books in Total |
| The India Rubber Boy | | Raduga Publishers | |
| Alive Hat | | | |
| Visiting Grandpa | 1975 | | |
| Eleven Stories for Boys and Girls | 1981 | | |

== Tribute ==
On 23 November 2018, a Google Doodle was displayed to celebrate his 110th birthday.
