= Bo Asplund =

Swedish diplomat

Bo Asplund served as United Nations Secretary-General’s Deputy Special Representative for Afghanistan, the United Nations Resident Coordinator and the Humanitarian Coordinator in Afghanistan. He was appointed to the position by United Nations Secretary-General Ban Ki-moon in August 2007.

Asplund obtained his master's degree in international economics from Columbia University’s School of International and Public Affairs and master's and bachelor's degrees in economics, political science and statistics from the University of Lund (Sweden). He also holds a Certificat d’Etudes Politiques from the Institut d’Etudes Politiques in Paris.

In the beginning of his career, he worked for the Ministry for Foreign Affairs of the Swedish Government in Stockholm. He was also posted to Chile and the Swedish Mission to the United Nations.

Besides his diplomatic experience, Asplund has worked in various capacities for international organizations. He has served as Deputy Assistant Administrator of UNDP’s Regional Bureau for Arab States at the Organization's Headquarters in New York, United Nations Resident Coordinator and UNDP Resident Representative in Algeria, and UNDP Senior Deputy Resident Representative in the Sudan. From 2001 to 2007, he was the United Nations Resident and Humanitarian Coordinator and the United Nations Development Programme (UNDP) Resident Representative in Indonesia. Between 1998 - 1999, he was director of Program Management Division of Oil-for-Food program in New York.
