= Jacques Bertillon =

A French Demographer

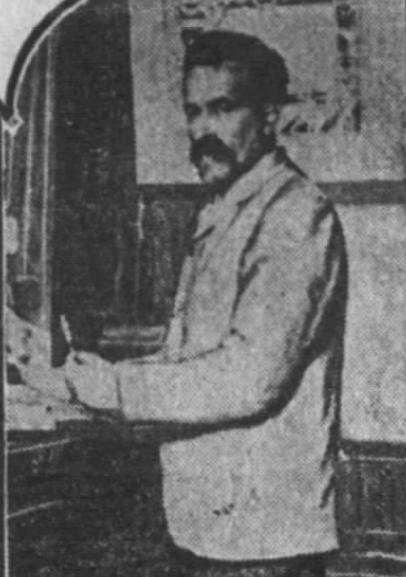
- Born: 11 November 1851; Paris, France
- Died: 4 July 1922 (aged 70); Paris, France
- Occupations: Statistician, demographer
- Spouse: Caroline Schultze
- Children: 2, including Suzanne Bertillon
- Father: Louis Bertillon
- Relatives: Alphonse Bertillon (brother)

Jacques Bertillon (11 November 1851 – 4 July 1922) was a French statistician and demographer.

Born in Paris, Bertillon was the son of statistician Louis Bertillon and the older brother of Alphonse Bertillon. He was educated as a physician but turned to statistical analysis. In 1880 he wrote La Statistique humaine en France. In 1891-93 he chaired a committee that introduced the Bertillon Classification of Causes of Death, which was adopted by several countries; it was the precursor to today's International Statistical Classification of Diseases (ICD) which continues to be published by the World Health Organization. By comparing statistics from different European countries he discovered the correlation between suicide rates and divorces, claiming that both phenomena were associated with social disequilibrium, ideas influencing Émile Durkheim in his work Suicide.

Bertillon married the physician Caroline Schultze; they had two daughters.

He died in Paris on 4 July 1922. Anticipating his death, he prepared a letter to several newspaper editors which stated "When you receive this I will no longer exist," and respectfully requested an obituary for himself.
