= Louis Bertillon =

French statistician (1821–1883)

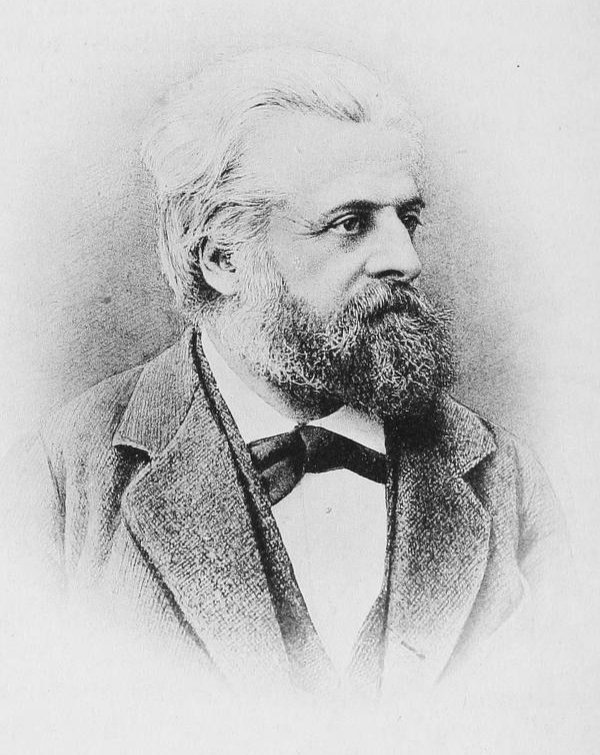

Louis-Adolphe Bertillon (French: [bɛʁtijɔ̃]; 1 April 1821 in Paris – 28 February 1883 in Neuilly-sur-Seine) was a French statistician.

== Life ==
He was born in Paris on the 1 April 1821. He practised as a medical doctor for a number of years. After the revolution of 1870, he was appointed inspector-general of benevolent institutions. He was one of the founders of the school of anthropology of Paris and was appointed a professor there in 1876. His Demographic figurée de la France (1874) is an able statistical study of the population of France. He died at Neuilly on 28 February 1883.

His son Alphonse Bertillon is known for the invention of anthropometry, and another son Jacques also became a notable statistician. His granddaughter, Suzanne Bertillon, was a journalist and resistance fighter.
