= René Gillouin =

French intellectual (1881–1971)

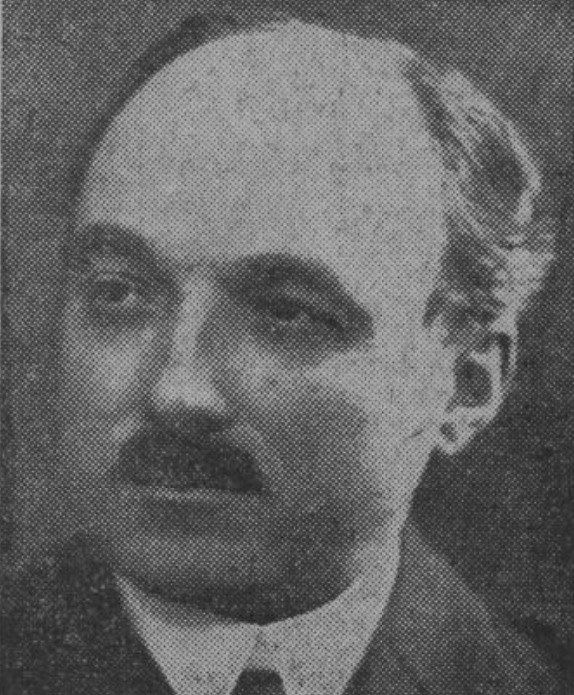
- René Gillouin in Comœdia, July 12, 1927
- Born: Charles Auguste René Gillouin; March 11, 1881; Aouste-sur-Sye, Drôme, France
- Died: April 2, 1971 (aged 90); Paris, France
- Occupations: Writer, journalist, literary critic, politician

René Gillouin (born Charles Auguste René Gillouin, March 11, 1881 – April 2, 1971) was a French intellectual, writer, literary critic, journalist, and politician. He is known for his traditionalist and Pétainist views and his Protestant faith.

== Early life and education ==
René Gillouin was born in Aouste-sur-Sye, in the Drôme region of France. He was the son of Emile Gillouin, a Protestant pastor affiliated with the Reformed Church of France. Emile, an intellectual and theologian, strongly influenced René's upbringing.

Gillouin attended various prestigious schools, including the Lycée Henri-IV in Paris. In 1902, he gained admission to the École normale supérieure. During his studies, he was influenced by Henri Bergson and corresponded with writers such as Maurice Barrès.

== Career ==
=== Civil service and politics ===
In 1905, Gillouin began a career as a civil servant at the Prefecture of the Seine. By 1912, he served as the chief of staff for the president of the Paris Municipal Council. He was elected to the Paris Municipal Council in 1931, representing the 6th arrondissement of Paris, and later became its vice president in 1937. A proponent of conservative and nationalistic values, Gillouin aligned with parties like the Fédération républicaine.

=== Literary and intellectual pursuits ===
Gillouin was an accomplished writer and literary critic. He contributed to journals such as Revue des deux Mondes and Mercure de France and authored several books, including works on Maurice Barrès and Henri Bergson. He directed the short-lived "Politeia" series at Grasset publishers in the 1920s and became a member of the Société des gens de lettres in 1924.

During the Interwar period, Gillouin participated in debates on religion, politics, and culture. He critiqued modernist tendencies in art and literature and opposed what he saw as the excessive materialism of contemporary society. His work often reflected his Protestant beliefs and his disdain for the legacy of the French Revolution.

=== Role under the Vichy regime ===
Gillouin supported the Vichy regime and became an advisor to Philippe Pétain. He authored speeches and essays promoting the regime's National Revolution. Although initially sympathetic to the regime's goals, he later opposed its anti-Semitic policies, which he condemned in private letters to Pétain.

=== Post-war life ===
After the Liberation of France, Gillouin lived in exile in Switzerland from 1943 to 1948. There, he continued to write, publishing works such as Problèmes humains, problèmes français (1944), which criticized French democracy while praising Swiss federalism.

Upon his return to France, he resumed his intellectual activities, contributing to conservative publications like La Nation française. He was a founding member of the Centre d'études politiques et civiques (CEPEC) in 1954, a think tank promoting conservative and Christian democratic values.

== Personal life ==
Gillouin married three times. His first marriage to Suzanne Berret produced a son, Marc Gillouin, who died in combat during World War II. He later married painter Laure Bruni and, after their divorce, Hélène Colomb.

== Publications ==
- Maurice Barrès (1907)
- Ars et vita (1907)
- Problèmes humains, problèmes français (1944)
- Aristarchie ou recherche d’un gouvernement (1946)
- J’étais l’ami du Maréchal (1966)

== Legacy ==
René Gillouin's contributions to French intellectual life remain controversial. While his literary criticism and philosophical writings are noted for their depth, his association with the Vichy regime and traditionalist politics has been a subject of debate.
