= Alphonse Bertillon =

French police officer and biometrics researcher (1853–1914)

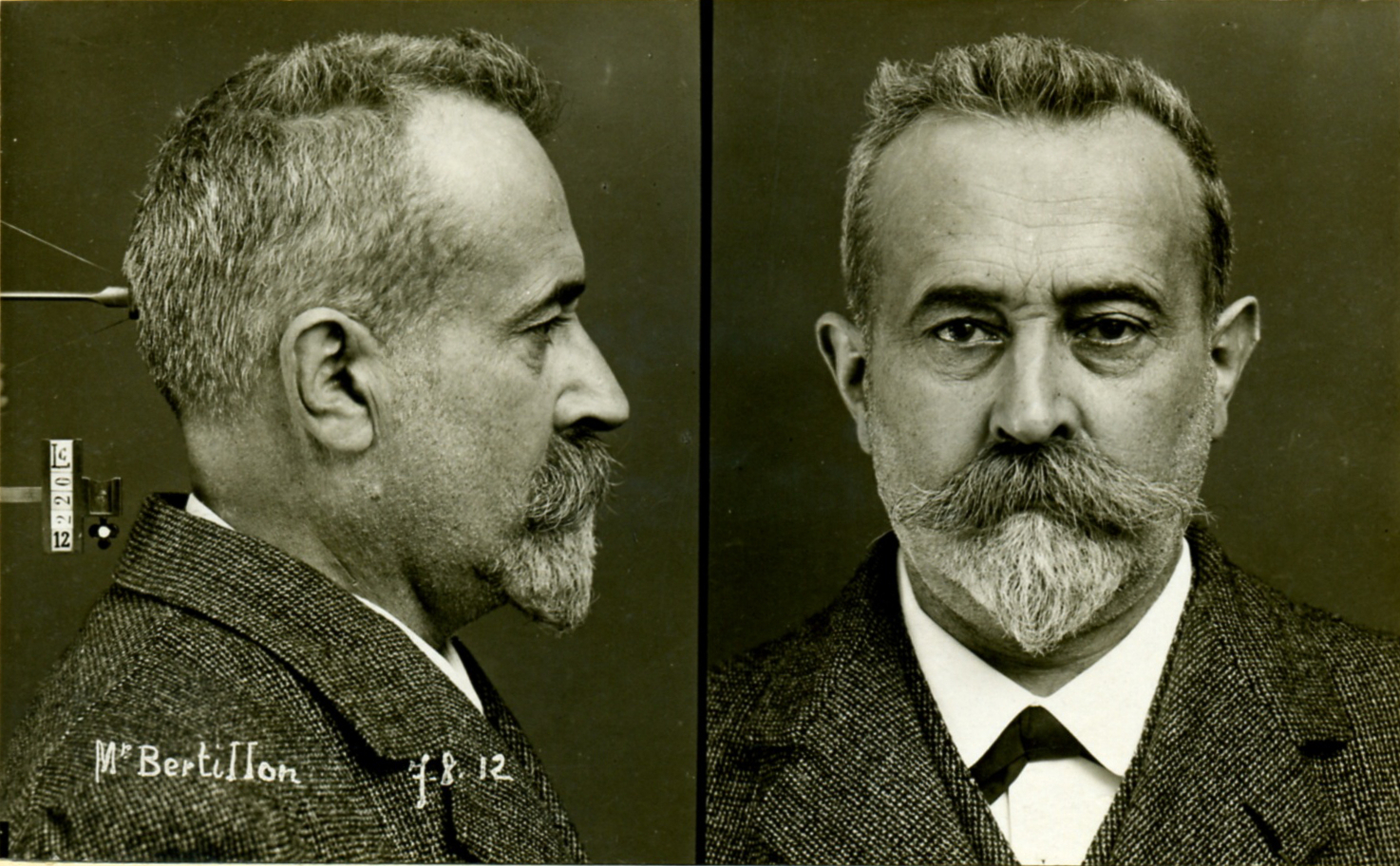
- Mug shot of Bertillon, 1912 (self-portrait)
- Born: 22 April 1853; Paris, France
- Died: 13 February 1914 (aged 60); Paris, France
- Occupations: law enforcement officer and biometrics researcher
- Father: Louis Bertillon
- Relatives: Suzanne Bertillon (niece)

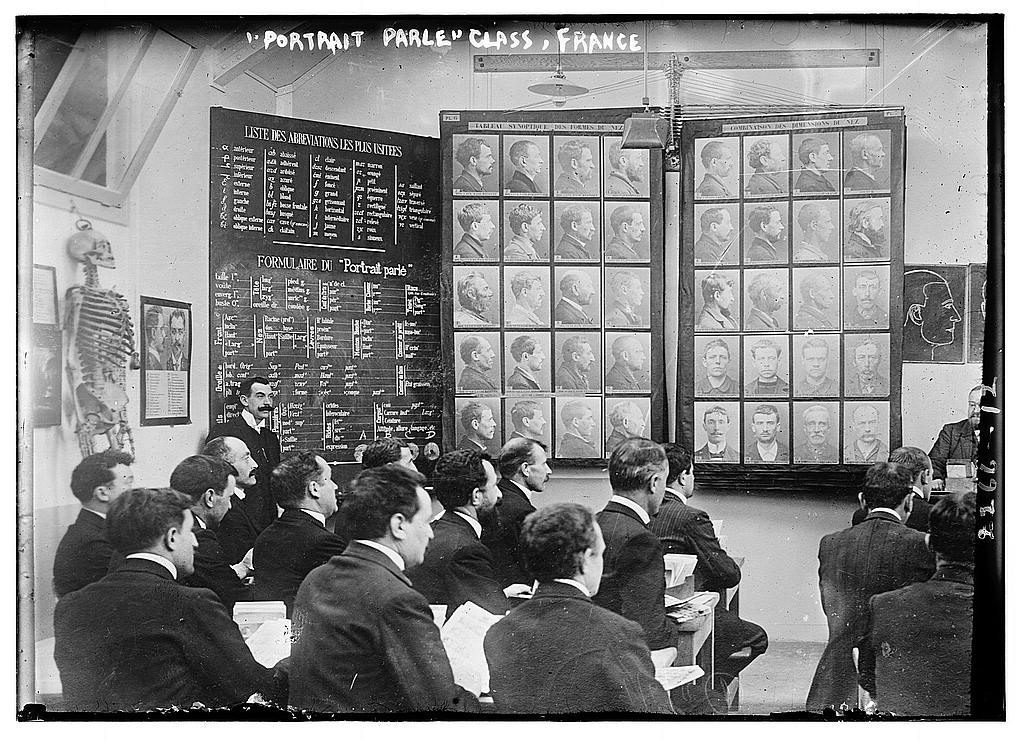
Class on the Bertillon system in France in 1911.

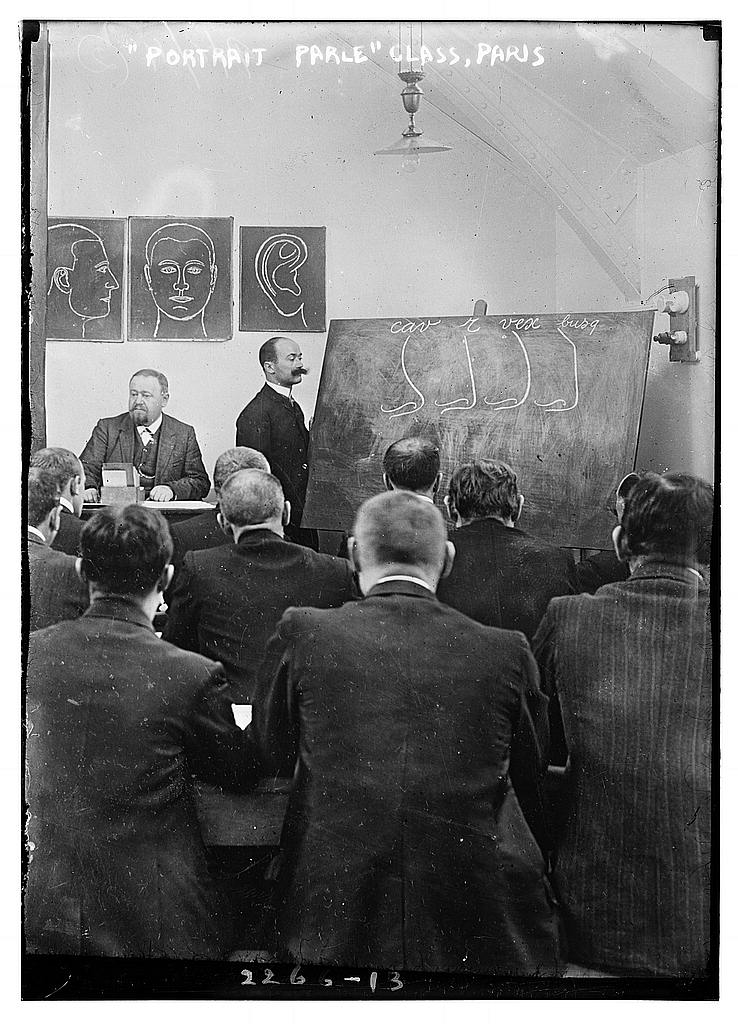
Class on the Bertillon system in France in 1911.

Alphonse Bertillon (French: [bɛʁtijɔ̃]; 22 April 1853 – 13 February 1914) was a French police officer and biometrics researcher who applied the anthropological technique of anthropometry to law enforcement, creating an identification system based on physical measurements.

Anthropometry was the first scientific system used by police to identify criminals. Before that time, criminals could only be identified by name or photograph. The method was eventually supplanted by fingerprinting.

He is also the inventor of the mug shot. Photographing of criminals began in the 1840s only a few years after the invention of photography, but it was not until 1888 that Bertillon standardised the process, notably with his file on anarchists.

His flawed evidence was used to wrongly convict Alfred Dreyfus in the infamous Dreyfus affair.

== Biography ==
Alphonse Bertillon was born in Paris. He was a son of statistician Louis-Adolphe Bertillon and younger brother of the statistician and demographer Jacques Bertillon.

After being expelled from the Imperial Lycée of Versailles, Bertillon drifted through a number of jobs in England and France, before being conscripted into the French army in 1875. Several years later, he was discharged from the army with no real higher education, so his father arranged for his employment in a low-level clerical job at the Prefecture of Police in Paris. Thus, Bertillon began his police career on 15 March 1879 as a department copyist.

Being an orderly man, he was dissatisfied with the ad hoc methods used to identify the increasing number of captured criminals who had been arrested before. This, together with the steadily rising recidivism rate in France since 1870, motivated his invention of anthropometrics. He did his measurements in his spare time. He used the famous La Santé Prison in Paris for his activities, facing jeers from the prison inmates as well as police officers.

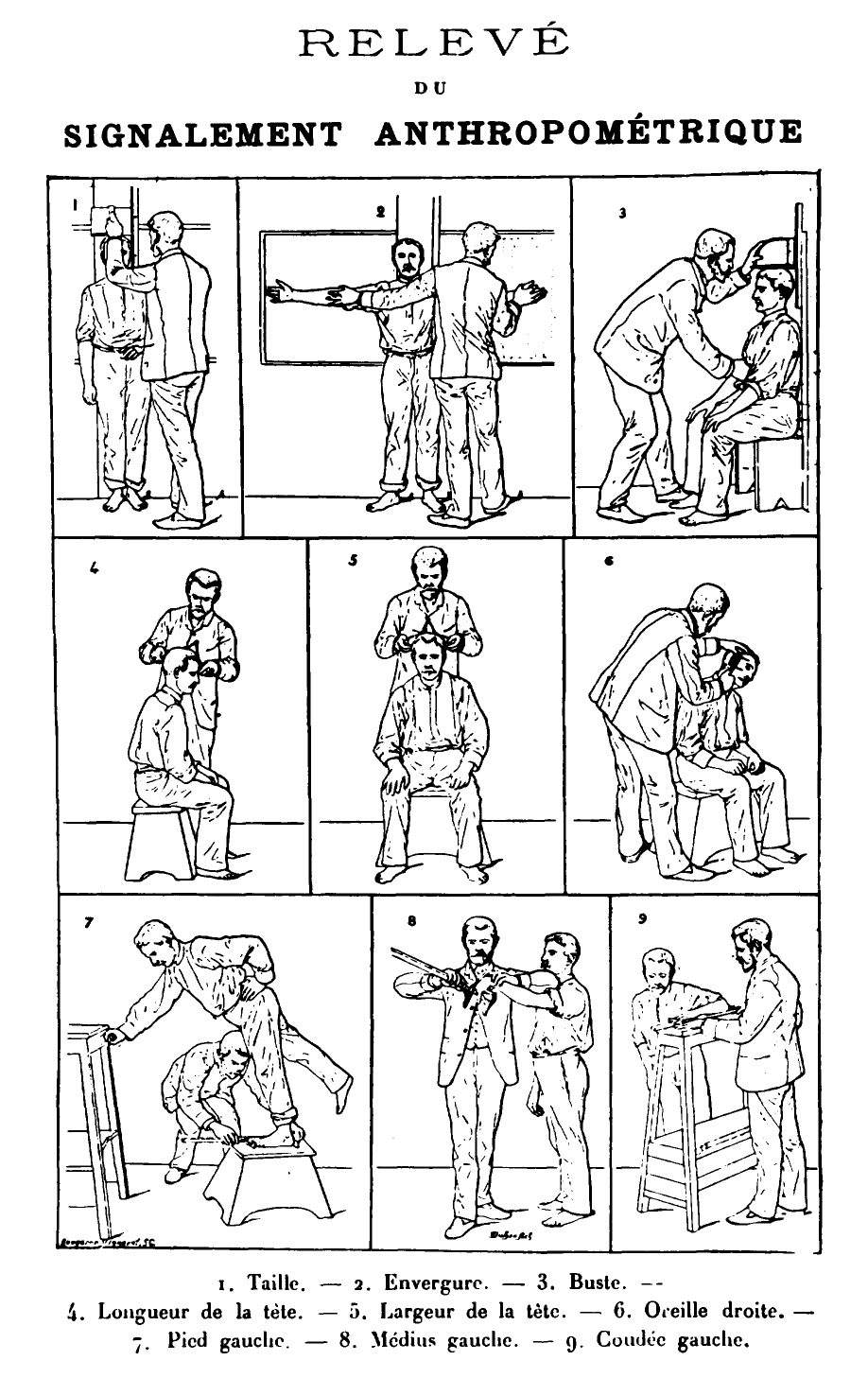
Frontispiece from Bertillon's Identification anthropométrique (1893), demonstrating the measurements needed for his anthropometric identification system.

Bertillon also created many other forensics techniques, including the use of galvanoplastic compounds to preserve footprints, ballistics, and the dynamometer, used to determine the degree of force used in breaking and entering.

The nearly 100-year-old standard of comparing 16 ridge characteristics to identify latent prints at crime scenes against criminal records of fingerprint impressions was based on claims in a 1912 paper Bertillon published in France.

Alphonse Bertillon died 13 February 1914 in Paris.

== Bertillon and the Dreyfus affair ==
Alphonse Bertillon was a witness for the prosecution in the Dreyfus affair in 1894 and again in 1899. He testified as a handwriting expert and claimed that Alfred Dreyfus had written the incriminating document (known as the "bordereau"). However, he was not a handwriting expert, and his convoluted and flawed evidence was a significant contributing factor to one of the most infamous miscarriages of justice — the condemnation of the innocent Dreyfus to life imprisonment on Devil's Island.

Using a complex system of measurements, he attempted to prove that Dreyfus had disguised his handwriting by imitating his own handwriting as if someone else was doing so, so that if anyone thought the bordereau was in Dreyfus's hand, he would be able to say that someone else had forged his writing. Both courts martial evidently accepted this, and Dreyfus was convicted. The verdict of the second court martial caused a huge scandal, and it was eventually overturned.

Bertillon was by many accounts regarded as extremely eccentric. According to Maurice Paléologue, who observed him at the second court-martial, Bertillon was "certainly not in full possession of his faculties". Paléologue goes on to describe Bertillon's argument as "... a long tissue of absurdities", and writes of "... his moonstruck eyes, his sepulchral voice, the saturnine magnetism" that made him feel that he was "... in the presence of a necromancer".

Bertillon claimed that his graphological system was based on mathematical probability calculus. A later analysis undertaken in 1904 by three renowned mathematicians, Henri Poincaré, Jean Gaston Darboux, and Paul Émile Appell, concluded that Bertillon's system was devoid of any scientific value and that he had failed both to apply the method and to present his data properly. With this key evidence against Dreyfus debunked, he was finally acquitted in 1906.

== Bertillon system ==
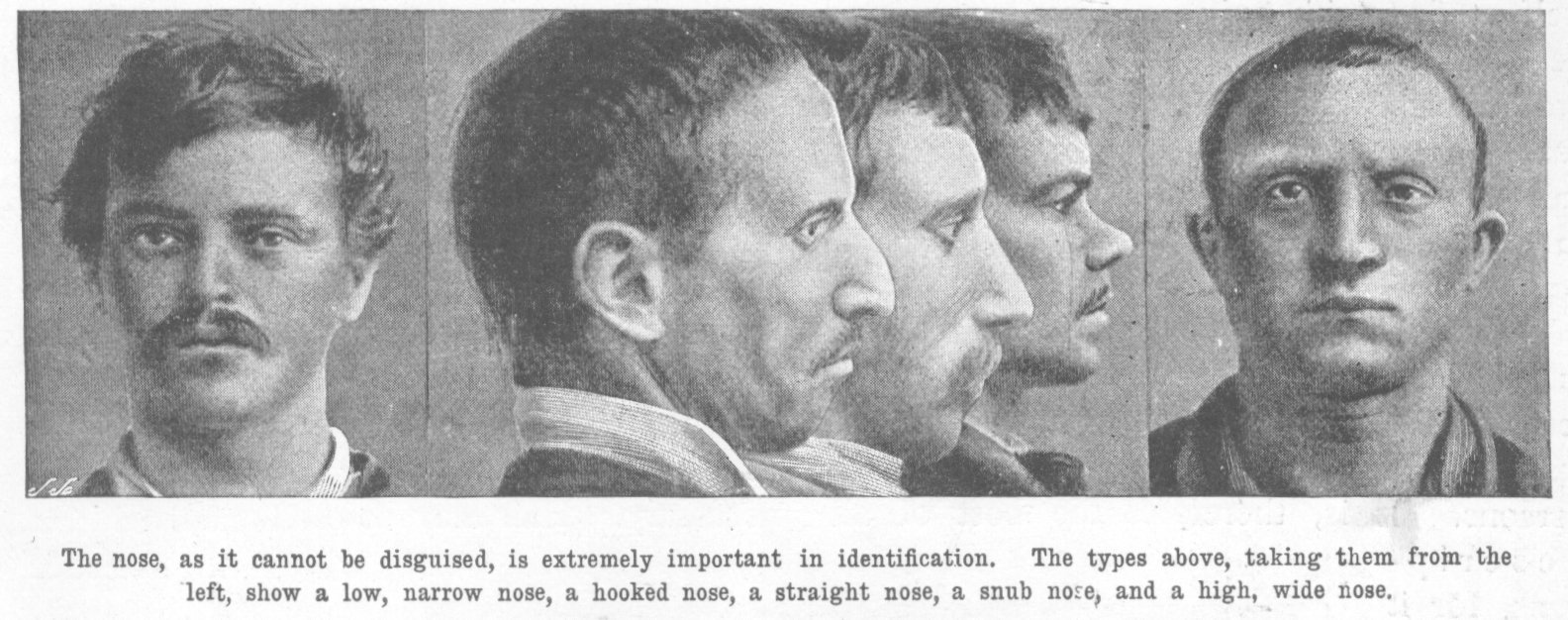
Illustration from "The Speaking Portrait" (Pearson's Magazine, Vol XI, January to June 1901) demonstrating the principles of Bertillon's anthropometry.

The specific anthropological technique practiced by Alphonse Bertillon is often called the Bertillon system. This system consisted of five initial measurements — head length, head breadth, length of middle finger, length of the left foot, and length of the cubit. Along with these measurements, Bertillon used photography, now known as a mug shot, to complete this system of record. These methods of identification were combined into a system for law enforcement officials to access information and images quickly.

Although the system was based in scientific measures, it was known to have its flaws. For example, it may not have been able to accurately apply to children or women, as it was mostly designed for men who had reached full physical maturity and had short hair.

=== Alley workers in Minneapolis ===
In the late 19th and 20th centuries, black women who were working as prostitutes in Minneapolis, Minnesota, became known as "alley workers". The Minneapolis Police Department followed the Bertillon system as a means to identify and document the crimes of these alley workers. The system soon became used as a tool to police and categorise these women.

In order to bypass the system, many black women would use aliases instead of their real names. The most common name that was used as an alias was "Mamie", which was also the alias used by Mamie Knight, whose was the only surviving photo of an alley worker during the department's period of using the Bertillon system. Her photo is currently located in the St. Paul police department archives.

== In media ==
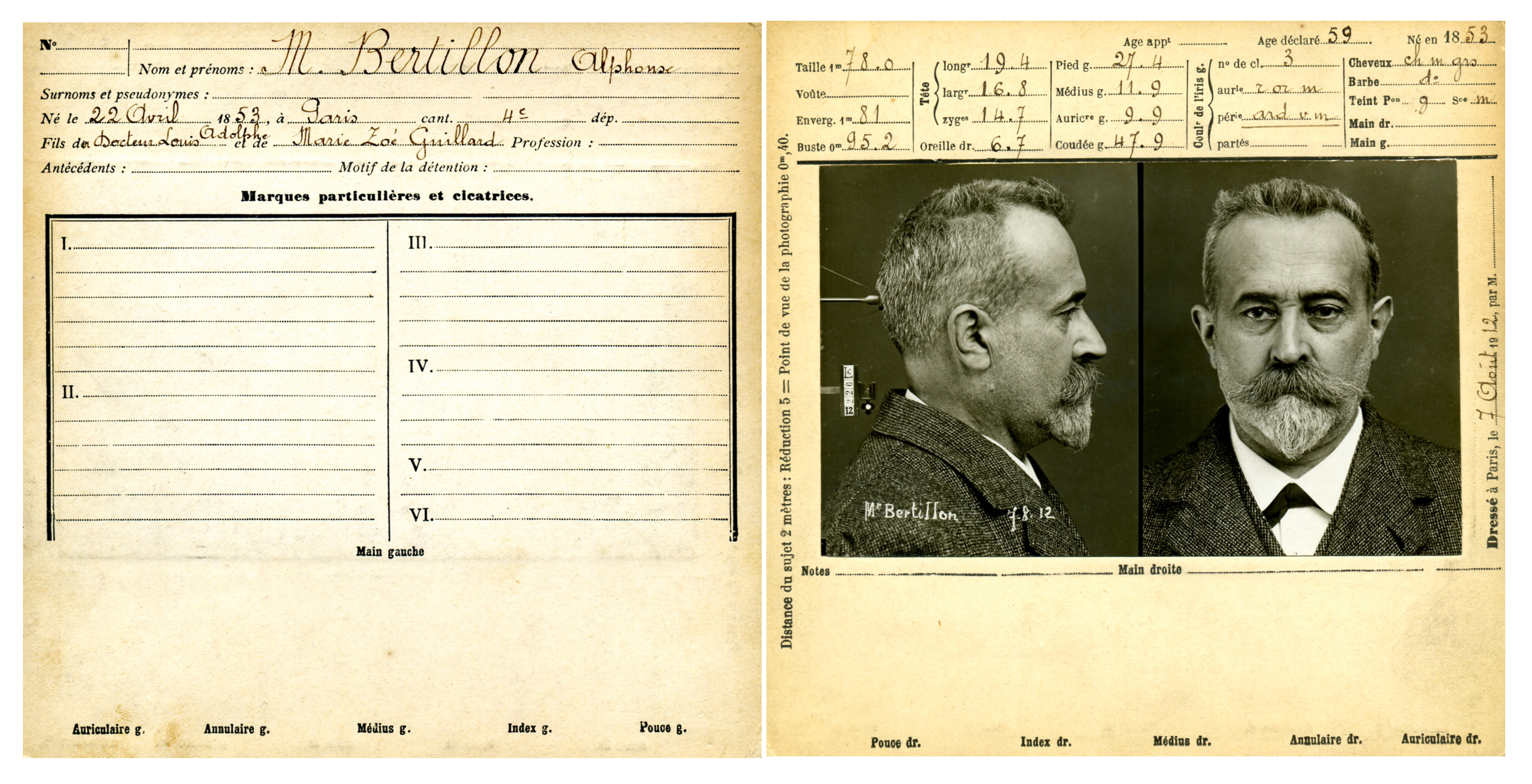
Anthropometric data sheet of Alphonse Bertillon

- Bertillon is the main character of the third episode of Czech television series The Adventures of Criminology called "Bertillonage".
- Mathieu Amalric plays Bertillon in the 2019 film An Officer and a Spy.
- Bertillon, played by Christian Hecq, is a character in the French Canal+ TV series Paris Police 1900 (2021) dealing with the anti-Semitic Dreyfus Affair aftermath; a minor plot point deals with his development of forensic anthropometry system ("Bertillonage").

== See also ==
- Joseph Petrosino

== References and sources ==
Sources

- Ginzburg, Carlo (1984). "Morelli, Freud, and Sherlock Holmes: Clues and Scientific Method". In Eco, Umberto; Sebeok, Thomas (eds.). The Sign of Three: Dupin, Holmes, Peirce. Bloomington, IN: History Workshop, Indiana University Press. pp. 81–118. ISBN 978-0-253-35235-4. LCCN 82049207. OCLC 9412985. Ginzburg describes Bertillon's role in the development of forensic science. This essay is a discussion of the conjectural paradigm as evidenced by the methods of Giovanni Morelli, Sigmund Freud and Sherlock Holmes in the light of Charles Sanders Peirce's logic of making good guesses or abductive reasoning.
