= Hippolyte de La Rochefoucauld =

Hippolyte Marie Thomas Auguste de La Rochefoucauld, Count de La Rochefoucauld (13 August 1804 – 11 January 1893) was a French diplomat.

== Early life ==
The Count de La Rochefoucauld was born into the French noble House of La Rochefoucauld on 13 August 1804 at Liancourt. He was the youngest son of François de La Rochefoucauld, 8th Duke of La Rochefoucauld (1765–1848) and Marie Françoise de Tott (1770–1854). Among his siblings were François de La Rochefoucauld, 9th Duke of La Rochefoucauld, Count Olivier de La Rochefoucauld (who married Rosine Cuillier-Perron, a daughter of Gen. Pierre Cuillier-Perron) Countess Sophie Francoise de La Rochefoucauld (who married Armand, Marquis de Castelbajac), Count Charles Frédéric de La Rochefoucauld (who married Anne Charlotte Cuillier-Perron, also a daughter of Gen. Pierre Cuillier-Perron), and Countess Frances "Fanny" de La Rochefoucauld (who married Count Armand Alexis de Montault, but was one of the mistresses of Anatoly Nikolaievich Demidov, 1st Prince of San Donato, and bore him an illegitimate child).

His paternal grandparents were François de La Rochefoucauld, 7th Duke of La Rochefoucauld and Félicité de Lannion. Among his extended family were uncles Alexandre, comte de La Rochefoucauld (who married Adélaïde de Pyvart de Chastullé, a San Domingo heiress allied to the Beauharnais family), and Frédéric Gaëtan de La Rochefoucauld, Marquis of Liancourt. His maternal grandparents were François Baron de Tott and Marie Rambaud and his maternal aunt was the well known French painter Sophie de Tott.

== Career ==
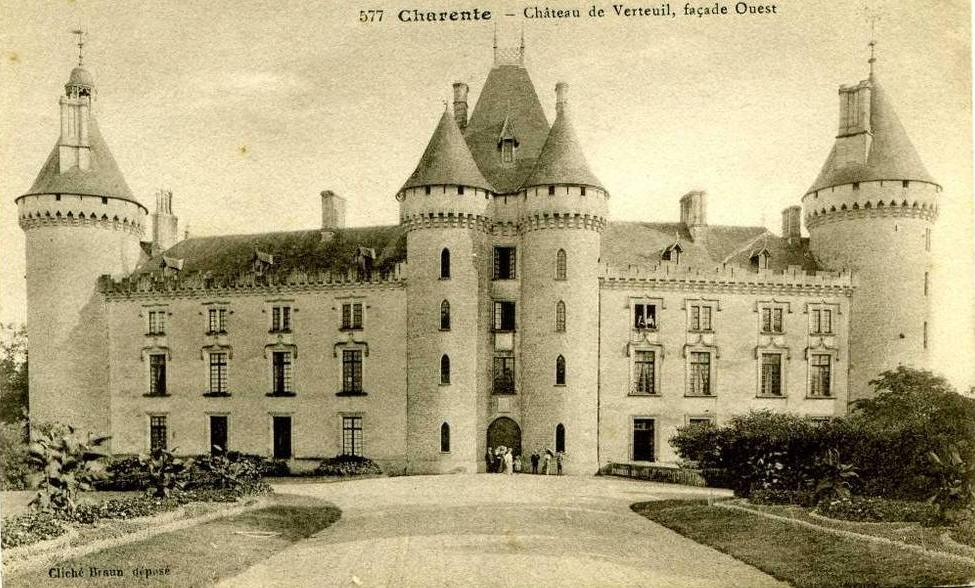
Château de Verteuil, early 20th century

A diplomat, Count de La Rochefoucauld served as Minister Plenipotentiary in Germany and to the Grand Duchy of Tuscany in Florence.

During the Second French Empire, Count de La Rochefoucauld retired to his family's longtime home, the Château de Verteuil, where he brought a fine collection of furniture and 18th-century Venetian glass chandeliers. He restored the great stone staircase. Influenced by Eugène Viollet-le-Duc, he transformed the large East tower into a library. He blocked up the old openings and pierced large new windows in the old walls. He also commissioned a copy of the statue by Didier Début on the façade of the Hôtel de Ville, Paris of the author of the Maximes. Hippolyte's son, Count Aimery, continued to collect souvenirs of their ancestors, turning the château into a sort of family museum. He redecorated the chapel and added stained glass windows.

== Personal life ==
On 26 August 1833, Count de La Rochefoucauld married Marie du Roux (1815–1875), a daughter of Anatole du Roux and Elisabeth Paira. Together, they were the parents of:

- Count Gaston François Louis Nicolas de La Rochefoucauld (1834–1915), who married Emily Victorine Elizabeth (née Rumbold) Cavendish, the daughter of Sir William Rumbold, 3rd Baronet and adopted daughter of Baron Ferdinand Moritz Delmar. Emily, the divorced wife of George Henry Cavendish (a son of Hon. Henry Cavendish and grandson of the 1st Earl of Burlington), had been created, suo jure, Baroness von Delmar in 1869, shortly before they married.
- Count Aimery Marie François Anatole de La Rochefoucauld (1843–1920), who married Henriette de Mailly-Nesle, a daughter of Ferry Paul Alexandre de Mailly, Count de Mailly d'Haucourt and Barbe Joséphine Odoard du Hazé.

Count de La Rochefoucauld died on 11 January 1893 in Paris.

=== Descendants ===
Through his younger son Aimery, he was a grandfather of Count Gabriel de La Rochefoucauld (1875–1942), who married Odile de La Chapelle de Saint-Jean de Jumilhac, a daughter of Armand Chapelle de Jumilhac, 7th Duke of Richelieu, and American heiress, Alice Heine (who became Princess consort of Monaco after marrying Albert I, Prince of Monaco in 1899 following the Duke's death).
