= François de La Rochefoucauld, 9th Duke of La Rochefoucauld =

French aristocrat

François de La Rochefoucauld
- 9th Duke of La Rochefoucauld; 3rd Duke of Liancourt; Prince of Marcillac
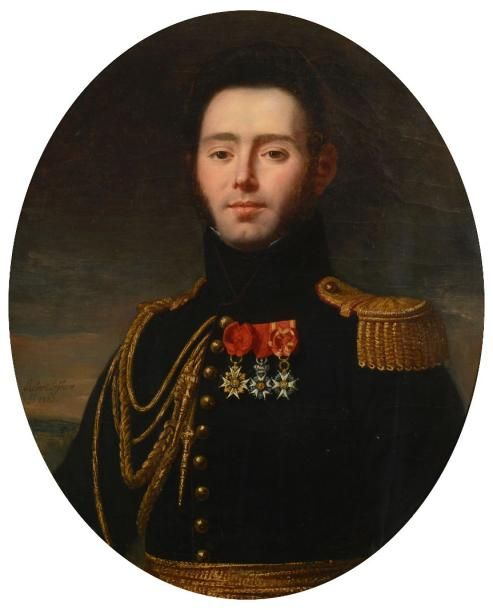
- Portrait of La Rochefoucauld, by Robert Lefèvre, 1823
- Full name: François Marie Auguste Armand Emilien de La Rochefoucauld
- Born: 17 December 1794; The Hague, Netherlands
- Died: 11 December 1874 (aged 79)
- Noble family: La Rochefoucauld
- Spouse: Zénaide Chapt de Rastignac (m. 1817; died 1874)
- Issue: François XV de La Rochefoucauld; Alfred de La Rochefoucauld; Georges de La Rochefoucauld
- Father: François XIII de La Rochefoucauld
- Mother: Marie Françoise de Tott

François XIV Marie Auguste Armand Emilien de La Rochefoucauld, 9th Duke of La Rochefoucauld (17 December 1794 – 11 December 1874) was a French aristocrat.

== Early life ==
De La Rochefoucauld was born on 1794 in The Hague, Netherlands. He was the eldest son and heir of François de La Rochefoucauld, 8th Duke of La Rochefoucauld and the former Marie Françoise de Tott (1770–1854). Among his siblings were Count Olivier de La Rochefoucauld (who married Rosine Cuillier-Perron, a daughter of Gen. Pierre Cuillier-Perron) Countess Sophie Francoise de La Rochefoucauld (who married Armand, Marquis de Castelbajac), Count Charles Frédéric de La Rochefoucauld (who married Anne Charlotte Cuillier-Perron, also a daughter of Gen. Pierre Cuillier-Perron), Count Hippolyte de La Rochefoucauld (who married Marie du Roux, a daughter of Anatole du Roux), and Countess Frances "Fanny" de La Rochefoucauld (who married Count Armand Alexis de Montault, but was one of the mistresses of Anatoly Nikolaievich Demidov, 1st Prince of San Donato, and bore him an illegitimate child).

His paternal grandparents were François de La Rochefoucauld, 7th Duke of La Rochefoucauld and Félicité de Lannion. Among his extended family were uncles Alexandre, comte de La Rochefoucauld (who married Adélaïde de Pyvart de Chastullé, a San Domingo heiress allied to the Beauharnais family), and Frédéric Gaëtan de La Rochefoucauld, Marquis of Liancourt. His maternal grandparents were François Baron de Tott and Marie Rambaud and his maternal aunt was the well known French painter Sophie de Tott.

== Career ==
Upon his father's death on 3 September 1848, he succeeded as the 9th Duke of La Rochefoucauld. He was made a Knight of the Order of Saint Louis and an Officer of the Legion of Honour.

== Personal life ==
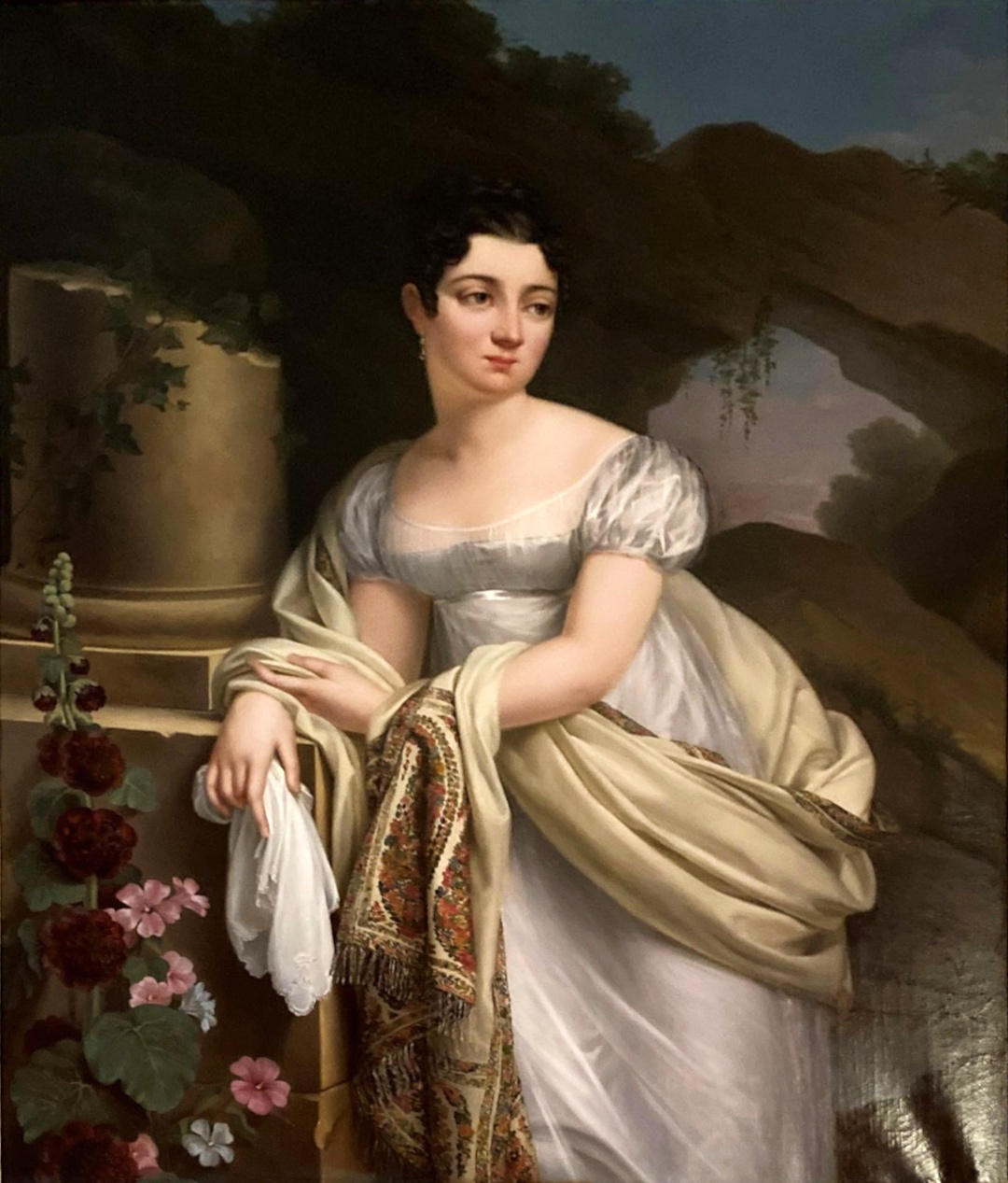
Portrait of Zénaïde Chapt de Rastignac, duchess of La Rochefoucauld, 1817, by Edmée Brucy

On 8 June 1817, La Rochefoucauld married Zénaide Chapt de Rastignac (1798–1875), a daughter of Pierre Chapt de Rastignac, owner of the Château de Rastignac (and granddaughter of Ambroise-Polycarpe de La Rochefoucauld). Together, they were the parents of:

- François XV de La Rochefoucauld (1818–1879), 10th Duke of La Rochefoucauld who married Radegonde Euphrasie Bouvery, a daughter of Claude Bouvery and Marguerite Barbuat, in 1850.
- Alfred de La Rochefoucauld (1819–1883), 1st Duke of La Roche-Guyon who married Isabelle Nivière, a daughter of Baron Laurent Antoine Isidore Nivière and Marie Léontine Françoise Siméon, in 1851.
- Georges de La Rochefoucauld (1828–1861), styled Count of La Rochefoucauld who died unmarried.

The Duke died in Paris on 11 December 1874 and was succeeded in the dukedom by his eldest son, François XV, who became the 9th Duke of La Rochefoucauld.

=== Descendants ===
Through his son Alfred, he is ancestor of the La Roche-Guyon cadet branch of the family La Rochefoucauld.

French nobility
Preceded by François XIII de La Rochefoucauld	Duke of La Rochefoucauld; 1848–1874	Succeeded by François XV de La Rochefoucauld
