= La Rochefoucauld =

La Rochefoucauld (French pronunciation: [la ʁɔʃfuko]) may refer to:

== People ==
- Alexandre-François of La Rochefoucauld (1767–1841), (family surname) (1767–1841), of Liancourt (father's origin), 1st Count of La Rochefoucauld (his title), married Adélaïde de Pyvart de Chastullé, a San Domingo heiress allied to the Beauharnais family. Mme de La Rochefoucauld became dame d'honneur to the empress Josephine, and their eldest daughter married Francesco Borghese [fr], a brother-in-law of Pauline Bonaparte, Princess Borghese. La Rochefoucauld became ambassador successively to Vienna (1805) and to The Hague (1808–1810), where he negotiated the union of the Kingdom of Holland with France. During the "Hundred Days" he was made a peer of France. He subsequently devoted himself to philanthropic work, and in 1822 became deputy to the Chamber of Deputies and sat with the constitutional royalists. He was again raised to the peerage in 1831. His descendants became Dukes of Estissac and Princes of La Rochefoucauld-Montbel.
- Ambroise-Polycarpe de La Rochefoucauld (1765–1841), soldier and minister of Charles X
- Antoine de La Rochefoucauld (knight) (before 1552 – after 1569), French knight
- Antoine de La Rochefoucauld (1862–1959), 19th century Rosicrucian
- Dominique de La Rochefoucauld (1712–1800), French bishop and cardinal
- Dominique, Prince de La Rochefoucauld-Montbel (born 1950), diplomat, Grand Hospitalier of the Order of Malta, President of the French association, Chancellor of the « Académie des Psychologues du Goût »
- Edmée de La Rochefoucauld (1896-1991), French activist
- François III de La Rochefoucauld (1521–1572), French courtier and soldier
- François de La Rochefoucauld (cardinal) (1558–1645), French cardinal of the Catholic Church
- François de La Rochefoucauld (writer) (1613–1680), French author noted for his maxims and memoirs
- François de La Rochefoucauld, Marquis de Montandre (1672–1739)
- François Alexandre Frédéric, duc de La Rochefoucauld-Liancourt (1747–1827), social reformer
- François, duc de La Rochefoucauld (1765–1848)
- Frédéric Jérôme de La Rochefoucauld (1701–1757), French cardinal of the Catholic Church, Archbishop of Bourges
- Frédéric Gaëtan, marquis de La Rochefoucauld-Liancourt (1779–1863), politician
- Jean-Baptiste Louis Frédéric de La Rochefoucauld de Roye (1707–1746), French naval commander
- Jean-Dominique de La Rochefoucauld (1931–2011), French screenwriter and television director
- Louis Alexandre de La Rochefoucauld d'Enville (1743–1792), French aristocrat and politician
- Robert de La Rochefoucauld (1923–2012), French count and special operations executive

== Places ==
- La Rochefoucauld, Charente, a commune in the Charente département in France

== Family ==
- House of La Rochefoucauld

== See also ==
- Duc de La Rochefoucauld
- Établissement La Rochefoucauld, a school in Paris
