= Foucaud =

Foucaud is a surname. Notable people with the surname include:

- Julien Foucaud (1847–1904), French botanist
- Thierry Foucaud (born 1954), French politician

== See also ==
- Charles de Foucauld (1858–1916), explorer of Morocco, Catholic religious and priest
- Foucault (disambiguation)
