= François de La Rochefoucauld =

François de La Rochefoucauld may refer to:

- François III de La Rochefoucauld (1521–1572), French courtier and soldier
- François de La Rochefoucauld (cardinal) (1558–1645), French cardinal of the Catholic Church
- François de La Rochefoucauld (writer) (1613–1680), French author
- François de La Rochefoucauld, Marquis de Montandre (1672–1739), Field Marshal of the British Army
- François Alexandre Frédéric de La Rochefoucauld, 7th Duke of La Rochefoucauld (1747–1827), French social reformer
- François de La Rochefoucauld, 8th Duke of La Rochefoucauld (1765–1848)

== See also ==
- Duc de La Rochefoucauld
