= François de La Rochefoucauld, 8th Duke of La Rochefoucauld =

French aristocrat and writer

François de La Rochefoucauld
- 8th Duke of La Rochefoucauld
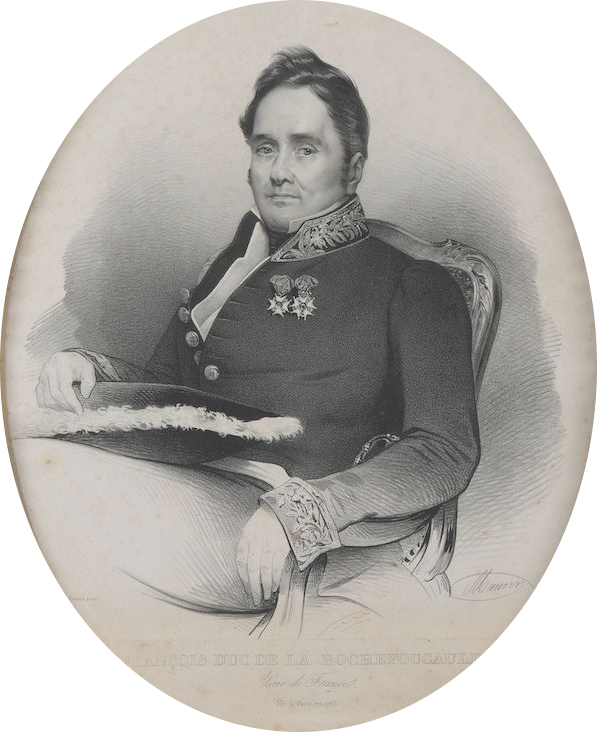
- François, Duke of La Rochefoucauld
- Born: 8 September 1765; Paris, Kingdom of France
- Died: 3 September 1848 (aged 82)
- Noble family: La Rochefoucauld
- Spouse: Marie Françoise de Tott (m. 1793; died 1848)
- Father: François Alexandre Frédéric de La Rochefoucauld
- Mother: Félicité de Lannion

François XIII de La Rochefoucauld, 8th Duke of La Rochefoucauld (8 September 1765 – 3 September 1848) was a French aristocrat and writer.

== Early life ==
De La Rochefoucauld was born on 8 September 1765 in Paris. was the heir and eldest son of François Alexandre Frédéric, duc de la Rochefoucauld-Liancourt and the former Félicité de Lannion. Among his siblings were Alexandre, comte de La Rochefoucauld, who married Adélaïde de Pyvart de Chastullé (a San Domingo heiress allied to the Beauharnais family), and Frédéric Gaëtan de La Rochefoucauld, Marquis of Liancourt.

== Career ==
Among his works are Mélanges sur l’Angleterre (a travel memoir) and Souvenirs du 10 Aoȗt 1792 et de l’Armée de Bourbon. The former has twice been translated into English: first in 1933 as A Frenchman in England, 1784 (translated by S.C. Roberts); and subsequently in 1988 as A Frenchman's Year in Suffolk, 1784 (edited and translated by Norman Scarfe). Norman Scarfe produced two further books about François and his brother Alexandre's travels in Britain, Innocent Espionage: The La Rochefoucauld Brothers' Tour of England in 1785 (1995) and To the Highlands in 1786: The Inquisitive Journey of a Young French Aristocrat (2001).

== Personal life ==
On 24 September 1793 he married Marie Françoise de Tott (1770–1854) at The Hague. The sister of French painter Sophie de Tott, she was the daughter of François Baron de Tott and Marie Rambaud. Among their children were:

- François XIV de La Rochefoucauld (1794–1874), 9th Duke of La Rochefoucauld, who married Zénaide Chapt de Rastignac, a daughter of Pierre Jean Julie Chapt, Marquis of Rastignac (and granddaughter of Ambroise-Polycarpe de La Rochefoucauld), in 1817.
- Count Olivier de La Rochefoucauld (1797–1885), who married Rosine Cuillier-Perron, a daughter of Gen. Pierre Cuillier-Perron. After her death in 1852, he married Augustine Euphrosine Montgomery, a daughter of William W. Montgomery.
- Countess Sophie Francoise de La Rochefoucauld (1799–1877), who married Armand, Marquis de Castelbajac.
- Count Charles Frédéric de La Rochefoucauld (1802–1895), who married Anne Charlotte Cuillier-Perron, also a daughter of Gen. Pierre Cuillier-Perron.
- Count Hippolyte de La Rochefoucauld (1804–1893), Minister Plenipotentiary in Germany and Florence who married Marie du Roux, a daughter of Anatole du Roux; he made a number of changes to the interior of Château de Verteuil.
- Countess Frances "Fanny" de La Rochefoucauld (1807–1848), who married Count Armand Alexis de Montault. She was one of the mistresses of Anatoly Nikolaievich Demidov, 1st Prince of San Donato, and bore him an illegitimate child.

The Duke died on 3 September 1848 and was succeeded in the dukedom by his son, François XIV, who became the 9th Duke of La Rochefoucauld.

=== Descendants ===
Through his son François, he was a grandfather of François XV de La Rochefoucauld (1818–1879), 10th Duke of La Rochefoucauld, and Alfred de La Rochefoucauld, 1st Duke of La Roche-Guyon (through whom he is ancestor of the La Roche-Guyon cadet branch of the family La Rochefoucauld).

French nobility
Preceded by François de La Rochefoucauld	Duke of La Rochefoucauld; 1827–1848	Succeeded by François XIV de La Rochefoucauld
