= Habitation La Belle Gabrielle =

French Guianese plantation

The habitation La Belle Gabrielle or La Gabrielle was an habitation (plantation) in French Guiana. It was also known as the habitation des épiceries. It was used during the Ancien régime to grow clove trees starting around 1779. Lafayette bought the plantation in 1785 or 1786 and conducted experiments to humanize the slaves, which ended in failure around 1787. During the French Revolution, it was confiscated by the state and its slaves were eventually freed after slavery was abolished in French Guiana.

The habitation was named after a black maroon, Gabriel, that found refuge there.

== History ==
=== La Belle Gabrielle under the Ancien régime ===
Cloves found their way to French Guiana after being stolen from the Dutch by Pierre Poivre in 1770. They were first introduced to the colony around 1778-1780 on "La Belle Gabrielle". An agricultural station had been built on the habitation in 1778 to receive and multiply spice plants from the Indian Ocean. The French State the part of the habitation where clove trees were planted, if not more.

The clove trees started showing results in 1789, and Condorcet and others would make a report about the fruits' quality. By the early 1790s, 4000 clove trees were producing over 20 000 pounds of products at La Gabrielle's royal nursery. Since 1791, 18 000 new plants were in cultivation.

On 30 October 1790, the habitation (at least the parts owned by the State) was given to the municipality of Cayenne by the Colonial Assembly as part of a wider transfer of state properties during the power struggle between the Colonial Assembly and the governor.

=== Lafayette's experiment ===
By March 1783, La Fayette had started planning an experiment to free and humanize slaves. La Fayette wanted to give freed blacks a similar life situation to French peasants and demonstrate that they worked better than slaves. Lafayette's wife Adrienne de la Fayette took great interest in the project and was greatly involved in it.

Lafayette was supported in his project by Daniel Lescallier and the Duke of Castries. Lafayette also informed Condorcet of the project, who put him in relation with Henri de Richeprey, an engineer geograph. Thanks to the Duke of Castries's father, the marshal of France, the project was submitted to Louis XVI, who approved it. The king also authorized that a parallel experiment be done on a property of the Crown. The project had however to remain secret to avoid trouble with those benefiting from slavery.

Lescallier was sent to French Guiana as ordonnateur in 1785. He was to prepare the ground for Richeprey. Lafayette bought La Gabrielle in 1785 or 1786. It was worth 125 000 livres and cultivated sugarcane. The sale was negociated by Lescallier. The conditions of the sale are unclear, notably because the plot had not been clearly delimited during and since the previous sale. At the moment of the sale, there were 60 or so slaves assigned to the habitation's farm. Housing still needed to be built and land needed to be cleared. La Fayette also bought the habitation Maripa and the habitation Saint-Régis, while Richeprey bought the uncultivated Dupas concession next to La Gabrielle.

The experiment's fate appears unclear. According to some scholars, the experiment seem to have only been partially accomplished, if not at all. Richeprey settled La Gabrielle in late September 1786 and immediately considered the slaves to be freedmen; but he realized that they could not be given the habitation's land until they were used to working as freedmen. Richeprey attempted to educate them, experimented with new less painful ways to work, farmed new crops and fed the slaves better. According to Lafayette's instructions, slaves could not be sold, slaves were to be paid according to his production and rules were to be applied equally to blacks and whites. Slaves responded positively to these changes, and Richeprey started planning the expansion of the experiment over all of Guiana.

However, Richeprey's health deteriorated after his arrival in Guiana, and he died on 9 February 1787 from yellow fever. No one came to replace Richeprey, a discouraged Lescallier soon left Guiana, and Lafayette's experiment was abandoned. (Note: Richeprey's brother and La Fayette in his mémoire claim that the experiment was only abandonned after the habitation's confiscation by revolutionary authorities) At this point, there were plans for La Rochefoucauld and Malesherbes buying plantations and conducting similar experiments.

Lafayette was considered an emigré in 1793 and all his goods were confiscated, including his slaves and La Belle Gabrielle, which at this point brought in 300 000 francs.

=== Revolutionary control ===
After the abolition of slavery in French Guiana, employment contracts had to be negociated between plantation owners and workers. A provisory agreement was instored on La Belle Gabrielle where male workers were 40 sols paid per day and female workers 30 sols (an incredibly high amount according to the ordonnateur Corio). Corio wished to instead instore harvest profit-sharing and again negociated with the workers in late July. He failed to change their opinion on the manner of renumeration, but a work schedule was established.

Hour	Assignment
6:00 to 8:00	Work
8:00 to 9:00	Breakfast pause
9:00 to 12:00	Work
12:00 to 14:00	Pause
14:00 to 18:00	Work

During the Revolution, La Belle Gabrielle turned a profit.

=== Subsequent events ===
On 3 April 1802 La Fayette sold the habitation to the state.

A man named Martin headed the habitation during the Bourbon Restoration.
