= Déhérain =

Déhérain is a surname. Notable people with the surname include:

- Henri Dehérain (1867–1941), French historian and geographer
- Herminie Déhérain (1798–1839), French painter
- Pierre Paul Dehérain (1830–1902), French plant physiologist and agricultural chemist
- Pierre de Hérain, born Pierre Déhérain, (1904–1972), French film director
