= Still Life: Vase with Oleanders =

1888 painting by Vincent van Gogh

Vase with Oleanders
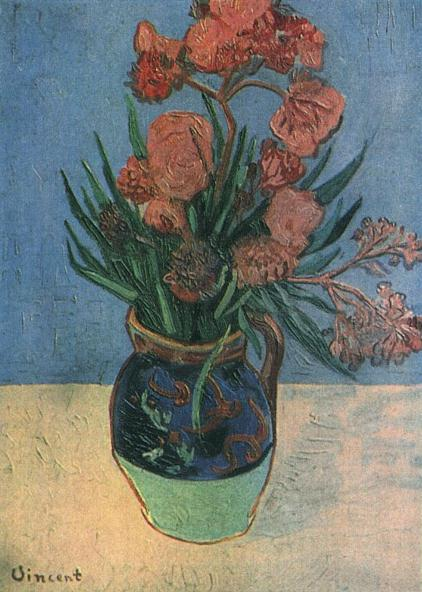
- Artist: Vincent van Gogh
- Year: 1888
- Catalogue: F594; JH1567
- Medium: Oil on canvas
- Dimensions: 56 cm × 36 cm (22 in × 14 in)
- Location: Location unknown

Vase with Oleanders was made in 1888 by Vincent van Gogh. The work's location is unknown and it is possibly stolen or possibly destroyed.

== Stolen paintings legend ==
Where Still Life: Vase with Oleanders resides is unknown. There is a theory, or maybe legend, that the painting was stolen in 1944 during World War II.

Prior to 1940 the painting was in the collection of the Bernheim-Jeune gallery in Paris. The Bernheim-Jeune gallery, owned by a French Jewish family, played an important role in marketing Impressionist and Post-Impressionist paintings in Paris. In 1901 Alexander Bernheim (1839-1915), with help from his sons, Josse (1870-1941), and Gaston (1870-1953), organized the first important exhibition of Vincent van Gogh paintings in Paris with the help of art critic Julien Leclercq, and the family (led by Josse and Gaston) opened their gallery specializing in modern art in 1906.

In 1940 sensing that they, of Jewish background, would be targeted by the Nazi regime during World War II, the Bernheim-Jeune family packaged 30 or so Impressionist and Post-Impressionist paintings that were in their collection and brought them to the Château de Rastignac belonging to family friends in Dordogne for safekeeping. In 1941 their gallery was sequestered, paintings confiscated and their buildings sold.

On March 30, 1944 fleeing Nazi Schutzstaffel (SS) forces attempted to destroy the Château de Rastignac and they raided the château, (which was of special interest because the owners had British connections, and the chateau was modeled after the American White House) as retribution against the French Resistance. After five truckloads of items were removed from the house, it was set afire. The paintings may have been taken, or they may have been destroyed. Whatever the case, they have not been seen since.

== See also ==
- List of works by Vincent van Gogh
