= Ferdinand Moritz Delmar =

Baron Ferdinand Moritz von Delmar born Salomon Moses Levy (21 March 1781 – 27 November 1858) was a wealthy Prussian banker. He also owned coffee and tea plantations in Sri Lanka (then known as Ceylon) including his namesake Delmar Estate.

== Early life ==
Salomon Moses Levy was born in Charlottenburg, Berlin to a Jewish family that came from Poznan. His father, Moses Salomon Levy, was also a banker and grain merchant and his mother, Belle Goldschmidt, was the daughter of the court banker Ruben Hesse Goldschmidt in Kassel.

== Career ==
Delmar was also a banker and financier involved in the Prussian war tributes after the Treaties of Tilsit. He inherited Delmar and Co in 1809 and along with his brothers, he adopted the name of "Delmar" (meaning "of the sea") and converted to Christianity. He then became a councilor for Berlin and was a friend of the French aristocracy there.

In 1810 he received the Prussian title of Freiherr (baron) von Delmar. The Delmar company went out of business in 1825. Baron Delmar's estates in Ceylon were mortgaged to Baring Brothers and in 1897 the Ceylon lands were liquidated after a complicated court settlement between his adopted daughter Emily and coffee plantation owner John Boustead who had taken possession of the estates.

== Personal life ==
In c. 1815, he moved to Paris where he married Emily Rumbold (1790–1861), the daughter of Sir George Rumbold, 2nd Baronet and the former Caroline Hearn (who married Sir Sidney Smith after the 2nd Baronet's death). Delmar adopted his wife's niece (the daughter of Sir William Rumbold, 3rd Baronet):

- Emily Victorine Elizabeth Rumbold (1824–1904), who married George Henry Cavendish, a son of Hon. Henry Cavendish and grandson of the 1st Earl of Burlington, in 1848. They divorced in 1866, she was created Freifrau von Delmar in 1869. She remarried to Count Gaston de la Rochefoucauld, eldest son of Count Hippolyte de La Rochefoucauld and grandson of the 8th Duke of La Rochefoucauld, in 1870.

Baron von Delmar died on 27 November 1858.
