= Antoine de La Rochefoucauld =

Antoine de La Rochefoucauld may refer to:

- Antoine de La Rochefoucauld (knight), 16th-century French knight
- Antoine de La Rochefoucauld (artist) (1862–1959), French artist, patron and art collector
