= Foucault (disambiguation) =

Foucault may refer to:

- Foucault (surname)
- Léon Foucault (1819–1868), French physicist. Three notable objects were named after him:
  - Foucault (crater), a small lunar impact crater
  - 5668 Foucault, an asteroid
  - Foucault pendulum
- Michel Foucault (1926–1984), French philosopher
  - Foucault (Deleuze book) (1986), a book about the French philosopher by Gilles Deleuze
  - Foucault (Merquior book) (1985), a book about the French philosopher by J. G. Merquior

== See also ==
- Foucault's Pendulum (1988), a novel by Umberto Eco
- Charles de Foucauld, explorer of Morocco, Catholic religious and priest
