= Campbell Mustafa Ağa =

Campbell Mustafa Ağa, also known as İngiliz Mustafa (Mustafa the English) (fl. 1775), was a Scotsman who was the chief instructor in the new Ottoman Empire naval mathematical academy, the Hendishâne, succeeding François Baron de Tott. He later converted to Shia Islam.

== Bibliography ==
- Christopher Ferrard: "İngiliz Mustafa: A Scotsman in the service of the Ottoman Empire“ in Yücel Dağlı Anısına, Turkuaz Yayınları, 2016
