= Foucault (surname) =

Foucault is a surname which is a variant of the French name Fouquereau, itself derived from Fouquier, a variant of Foucher. Notable people with the surname include:

- Jean-Pierre Foucault (born 1947), French television host
- Jeffrey Foucault (born 1976), American songwriter
- Léon Foucault (1819–1868), French physicist
- Michel Foucault (1926–1984), French philosopher
- Steve Foucault (born 1949), former Major League Baseball pitcher
- David Foucault (born 1989), Canadian gridiron football player
- Marcel Foucault (born 1865), French philosopher and psychologist

== See also ==
- Charles de Foucauld
- La Rochefoucauld (disambiguation)
