= Ambroise-Polycarpe de La Rochefoucauld =

French soldier and politician

The Duke of Doudeauville GE
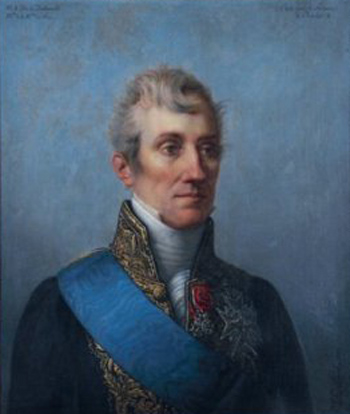
- 1827 portrait by Pierre-Louis Delaval
- Born: Ambroise-Polycarpe de La Rochefoucauld; 2 April 1765; Paris, France
- Died: 2 June 1841 (aged 76); Château de Montmirail, Montmirail, Marne, France
- Spouse: Bénigne-Augustine Le Tellier de Louvois (m. 1779; died 1841)
- Parent(s): Jean-François de La Rochefoucauld; Anne-Sabine-Rosalie de Chauvelin

Ambroise-Polycarpe de La Rochefoucauld GE (2 April 1765 – 2 June 1841), 1st Duke of Doudeauville, was a French soldier and politician. He was Minister of the Royal Household from 1821 to 1827.

== Early life ==
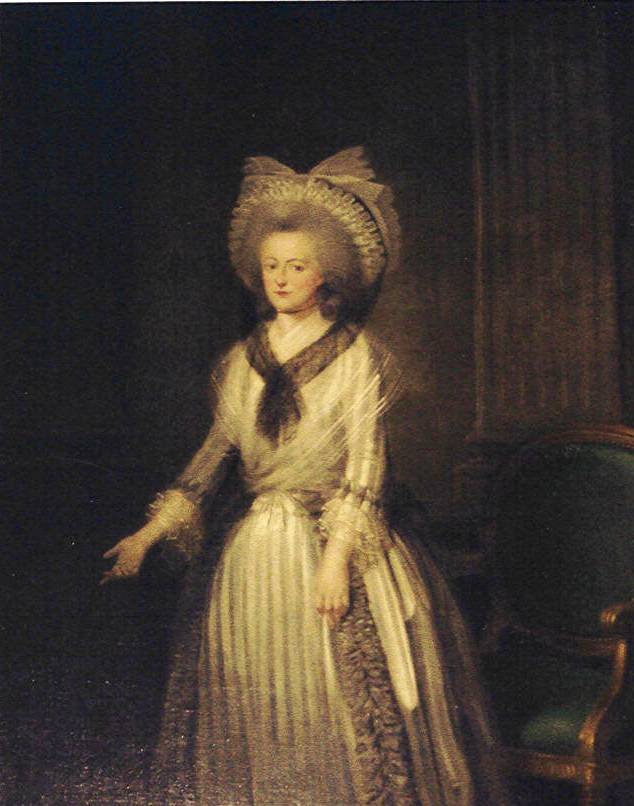
Portrait of his mother, Anne-Sabine-Rosalie de Chauvelin

Ambroise-Polycarpe de La Rochefoucauld was born in Paris on 2 April 1765 into the House of La Rochefoucauld. He was a son of Anne-Sabine-Rosalie de Chauvelin and Brigadier Jean-François de La Rochefoucauld (1735-1789), 5th Marquis of Surgères, who was Governor of Chartres. His only surviving sibling, Anne Alexandrine Rosalie de La Rochefoucauld, had married Armand Alexandre Roger de La Rochefoucauld, Count of Durtal (younger brother of François de La Rochefoucauld, 7th Duke of La Rochefoucauld). His sister, the Countess of Durtal, was guillotined in Paris in 1794 during the Reign of Terror alongside their uncle, Louis Desacres de l'Aigle.

His paternal grandfather was Alexandre-Nicolas de La Rochefoucauld, 4th Marquis of Surgères, who was cited by Voltaire in his Éloges. His maternal grandfather was Germain Louis de Chauvelin, Marquis de Grosbois, Keeper of the Seals of France.

== Career ==
At age 16, he joined the Dragoons as a Second lieutenant, serving in the King's Army until 1792, rising to the rank of Deputy-Major of Cavalry. During the French Revolution he emigrated, and made a series of tours of different countries of Europe, returning to France under the Consulate, but staying out of politics. Despite offers from Napoleon, he only accepted the position of a member of the General Council of the Marne.

The Duke of Doudeauville title was created for La Rochefoucauld in the peerage of the Kingdom of Spain in 1782, granting him precedence as a Grandee of Spain (through his wife as heir to the title of Duke of Doudeauville of the Le Tellier de Courtanvaux family).

=== Bourbon Restoration ===
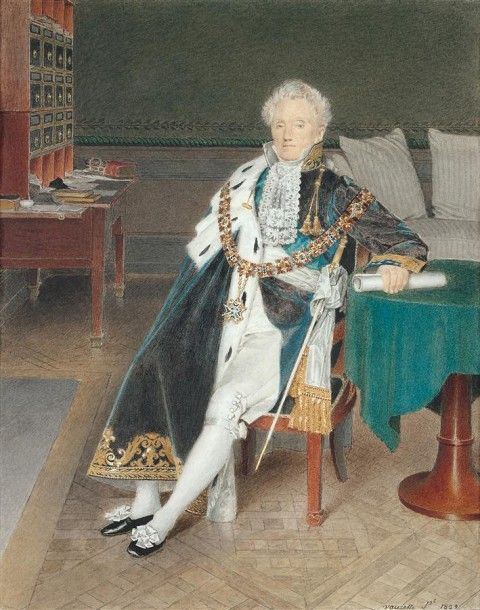
Portrait of La Rochefoucauld by Jean-Lubin Vauzelle, 1829

After the first Bourbon Restoration on 4 June 1814, De la Rochefoucauld was appointed to the Chamber of Peers. (Note: The Peerage of France was recreated by the Charter of 1814 at the same time as the Bourbon Restoration, albeit on a different basis from that of the ancien regime before 1789. A new Chamber of Peers was created which was similar to the British House of Lords, and it met at the Palais du Luxembourg. This new Chamber of Peers acted as the upper house of the French parliament.) His dukedom was not recognized in France until the Charter of 1814. He was made a Hereditary peer of France on 19 August 1815, Hereditary Duke-Peer on 31 August 1817. He sat among the most ardent royalists. He voted for death in the trial of Marshal Ney. He fought against freedom of the press, which he viewed as a source of ruin for the country.

On 26 September 1822 he was appointed director general of the posts. He gained a reputation as a skilled administrator, and introduced several visible improvements in the service.

On 4 August 1824 King Charles X appointed La Rochefoucauld Minister of the Royal Household in place of Marshal Jacques Lauriston. One of his main acts while in office was to acquire the lands of Grignon for the royal domain and to establish there the Royal Agronomic Institute of Grignon. In 1828, he fought against the dismissal of the National Guard. He resigned as minister on 4 January 1828 and from then on devoted himself to managing charitable institutions.

=== July Monarchy ===
La Rochefoucauld was greatly attached to the elder branch of the Bourbons, and did not approve of the July Revolution of 1830. He spoke in the Chamber of Peers against proposals to perpetually banish the former royal family. On 9 January 1831 he resigned from the Chamber and his name was removed from the list of peers of France.

== Personal life ==
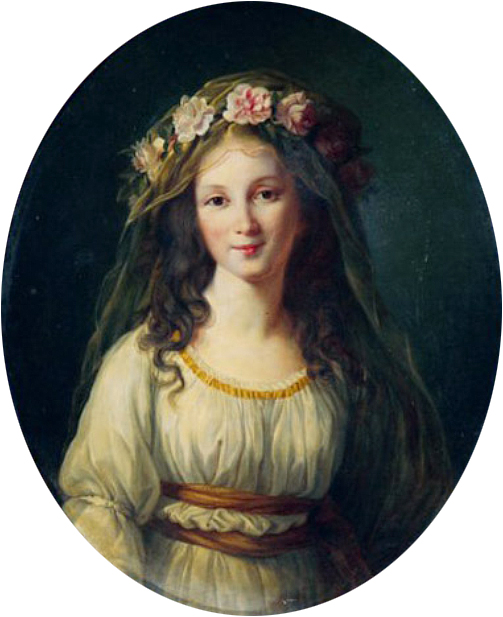
Portrait of his wife Bénigne by Élisabeth Louise Vigée Le Brun, c. 1785

On 8 April 1779, at the age of fourteen, La Rochefoucauld married Bénigne-Augustine Le Tellier de Louvois (1764–1849), Mademoiselle de Montmirail, eldest daughter and heiress of Charlotte-Bénigne Le Ragois de Bretonvilliers and Charles-François-César Le Tellier de Louvois and a descendant of François-Michel le Tellier, Marquis de Louvois. In 1822, Bénigne was a founder of the Religieuses de Nazareth. Together, they were the parents of:

- Françoise Charlotte Ernestine de La Rochfoucauld (1781–1802), who married Pierre Jean Julie Chapt, Marquis of Rastignac, in 1798.
- Louis François Sosthènes I de La Rochefoucauld (1785–1864), 2nd Duke of Doudeauville, who married Elisabeth de Montmorency-Laval, a daughter of Minister of Foreign Affairs Mathieu de Montmorency, 1st Duke of Montmorency-Laval, in 1807.

He died at the Château de Montmirail, Montmirail, Marne, on 2 June 1841, aged 76.

=== Descendants ===
Through his daughter Françoise, he was a grandfather of Zénaïde Chapt de Rastignac (1798–1875), who married François XIV de La Rochefoucauld, 9th Duke of La Rochefoucauld (eldest son and heir of François de La Rochefoucauld, 8th Duke of La Rochefoucauld), in 1817.

French nobility
New creation	Duke of Doudeauville; 1780–1841	Succeeded by Sosthènes I de La Rochefoucauld
Preceded by Jean-François de La Rochefoucauld	Marquis of Surgères; 1789–1841	Succeeded by Sosthènes I de La Rochefoucauld
Government offices
Preceded by Jacques Alexandre Law de Lauriston	Minister of the King's Household; 1824–1828	Succeeded by Camille de Montalivet
