= Verteuil-sur-Charente =

- Commune
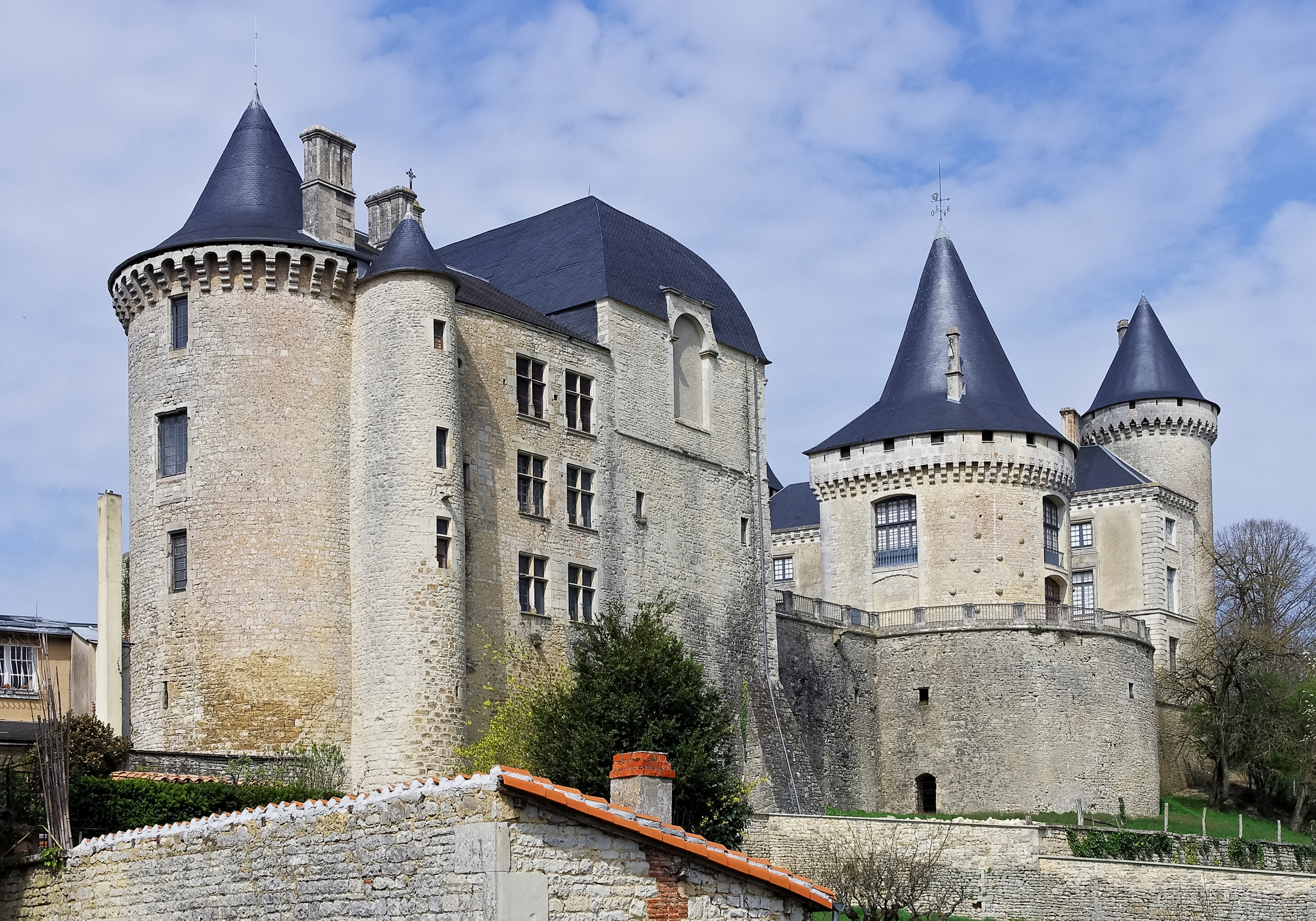
- Château de Verteuil
- Location of Verteuil-sur-Charente
- Location within France Location within Nouvelle-Aquitaine
- Coordinates: 45°58′59″N 0°13′50″E
- Country: France
- Region: Nouvelle-Aquitaine
- Department: Charente
- Arrondissement: Confolens
- Canton: Charente-Nord
- Intercommunality: Val de Charente

Government
  - Mayor (2020–2026): Clauddy Seguinar
- Area^{1}: 14.24 km^{2} (5.50 sq mi)
- Highest elevation: 133 m (436 ft)
- Lowest elevation: 72 m (236 ft)
- Population (2023): 580
  - Density: 41/km^{2} (110/sq mi)
- Time zone: UTC+01:00 (CET)
  - Summer (DST): UTC+02:00 (CEST)
- INSEE/Postal code: 16400 /16510
- ^{1} French Land Register data, which excludes lakes, ponds, glaciers > 1 km^{2} (0.386 sq mi or 247 acres) and river estuaries.

Verteuil-sur-Charente (French pronunciation: [vɛʁtœj syʁ ʃaʁɑ̃t], literally Verteuil on Charente, before 1962: Verteuil) is a commune in the Charente department in southwestern France.

The village is dominated by the Château de Verteuil.

== Population ==
Historical population
| Year | Pop. | ±% p.a. |
|---|---|---|
| 1968 | 802 | — |
| 1975 | 719 | −1.55% |
| 1982 | 770 | +0.98% |
| 1990 | 714 | −0.94% |
| 1999 | 718 | +0.06% |
| 2007 | 720 | +0.03% |
| 2012 | 604 | −3.45% |
| 2017 | 658 | +1.73% |
| 2023 | 580 | −2.08% |
Source: INSEE

== See also ==
- Communes of the Charente department
