= Thierry Foucaud =

French politician

Thierry Foucaud (born 18 January 1954) is a member of the Senate of France, representing the Seine-Maritime department. He is a member of the Communist, Republican, Citizen and Ecologist group. He has been vice-president of the Senate since 2011.
