= Antoine de La Rochefoucauld (knight) =

Antoine II de La Rochefoucauld, seigneur de Chaumont-sur-Loire, chambellan du Roi

Antoine de la Rochefoucauld, Seigneur de Chaumont-sur-Loire, served Louis I de Bourbon, prince de Condé as a knight (chevalier de l'ordre du Roi) and his chamberlain. On 7 October 1552, he married Cécile de Montmirail, daughter of Étienne de Montmirail, seigneur de Chambourcy, maître des requêtes and Louise de Selve.

He fought at the Battle of Jarnac on 13 March 1569, where the Prince de Condé was killed, and succeeded to withdraw his troops to Cognac. Charged by Gaspard de Coligny, he then took Nontron, 8 June.

== See also ==
- Duc de La Rochefoucauld
