= Sophie de Tott =

French artist (1758–1848)

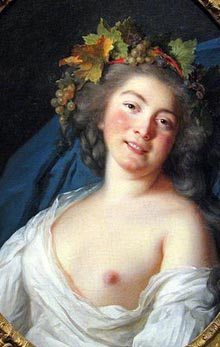
Portrait of Sophie de Tott in 1785

Sophie-Ernestine de Tott (1758 – 1848) was a French painter.

Born in Constantinople, Tott was the daughter of François Baron de Tott, who served as a consul in that city, and was of Hungarian descent. A chanoinesse of Sainte-Anne de Munich, she was entitled by rank to be called "Madame" and is usually so described, although she never married. Madame de Tessé took an interest in her and served as a maternal influence, and her sister married François, duc de La Rochefoucauld in 1793.

Tott was the subject of a portrait by Élisabeth Vigée Le Brun and corresponded with Thomas Jefferson. She is the subject of a portrait miniature in which she is painting a portrait of Madame de Tessé; sometimes attributed to her father, it may instead be a self-portrait. Tott fled the French Revolution, and between 1801 and 1804 exhibited a handful of portraits at the Royal Academy. In 1807 she was a member of the household of Elizabeth Craven.

She had returned to France by 1825, when she produced a copy of a portrait of the prince de Condé. Tott died in Versailles, leaving her sister as heir. A portrait by her of Augustus Curzon is held in Kedleston Hall. A copy of her will is in the National Archives of the United Kingdom.
