= Château de Verteuil =

Castle in Nouvelle-Aquitaine, France

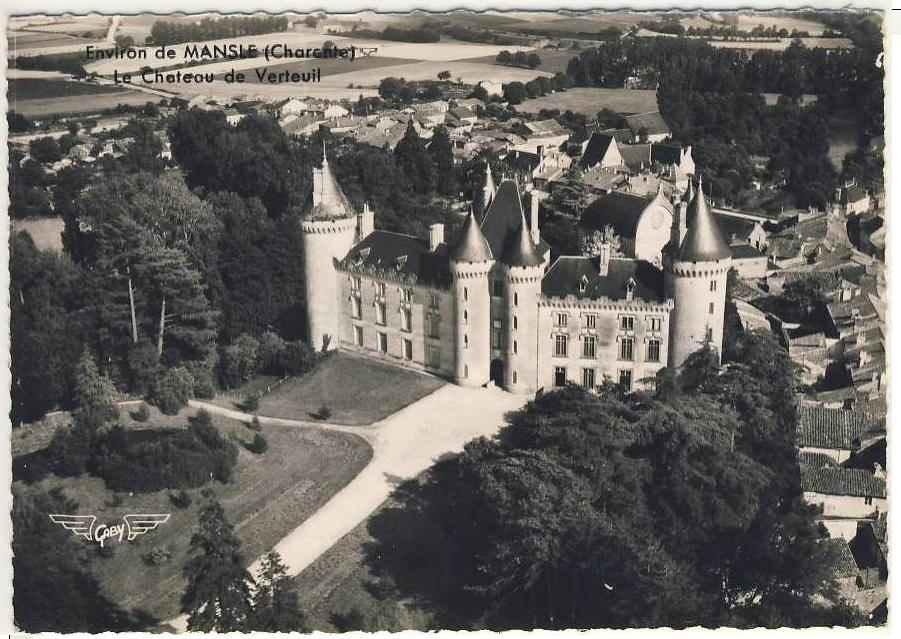
- 1922 postcard of the château

- Location within France

General information
- Type: Château
- Classification: Monument historique (9 November 2010)
- Location: Charente, Poitou-Charentes, France
- Coordinates: 45.98278°N 0.2306°E

Website
- www.reception-charente-parc-chateau.com/en/

The Château de Verteuil is a historic building in Charente, France. It dates back to 1080 and has since been extensively rebuilt, although 12th-century walls remain. The château has always been in the property of the La Rochefoucauld family.

During the Hundred Years' War (1337–1453) the château was occupied several times by the English. It was demolished in 1442, but was soon rebuilt using the original stones. In the religious wars of 16th and 17th centuries the château was a base for Huguenot forces, and in 1650 it was partly demolished by royal troops. Another château was erected but it received extensive damage in a fire in 1793 during the French Revolution. The château was renovated in the romantic style after the Bourbon Restoration of 1815, and has been extensively modified since then. During World War II (1939–45) the château housed French troops and refugees from Alsace-Lorraine in 1940 and for several months it was partially occupied by some German units. In 1944 some members of the maquis were hidden there. The château was listed as a monument historique on 31 March 1966, and obtained full protection on 19 November 2010.

The present château, designed on a triangular plan, has five conical towers and a watchtower capped by slate roofs. Archaeologists have uncovered traces of the older buildings on the site dating back to the 11th century. The architect Frantz Jourdain renovated the interior of the 14th-century tower as a library for the Rochefoucault family in 1893. The Hunt of the Unicorn tapestries of the building, which hung in the master bedroom, were rediscovered in 1850; they were later sold to John D. Rockefeller Jr. in 1923.

== Location ==
The castle is in a strategic position, dominating the village of Verteuil-sur-Charente and the Charente valley. In the past it controlled the road from Limoges to La Rochelle, on the route between the courts of France and Spain. The word "Verteuil" was often used in the Middle Ages to designate a fortified place. Jean Froissart (c. 1337–1405) described it as "un meult fort chasteau en Poictou sur les marches du Limousin et de la Saintonge" (a strong castle in Poitou on the borders of Limousin and Saintonge). The château, a few miles north of Angoulême and in fact in Angoumois, was later used as the country seat of the La Rochefoucauld family.

== History ==
=== Early years ===
The Château de Verteuil is recorded in 1080 as the property of the Lord of La Rochefoucauld. Since then the castle has almost always belonged to a member of this family. The first recorded successful siege was in 1135, by Count Wulgrin II of Angoulême (c. 1089–1140), when the castle belonged to Aymar II de la Rochefoucauld. Hostilities continued between their descendants, William VI of Angoulême (died 1179) and Guy IV of la Rochefoucauld, but had ceased by 1170 when they both attended the dedication of the church of Saint-Amant-de-Boixe. Louis VII of France (1120–80) and Eleanor of Aquitaine (1122–1204) may have stayed at Verteuil in 1137. Eleanor's mother was a Rochefoucauld, and due to the unsettled state of the country the young couple only stayed in safe and preferably well-fortified places in their journey from Bordeaux to Paris.

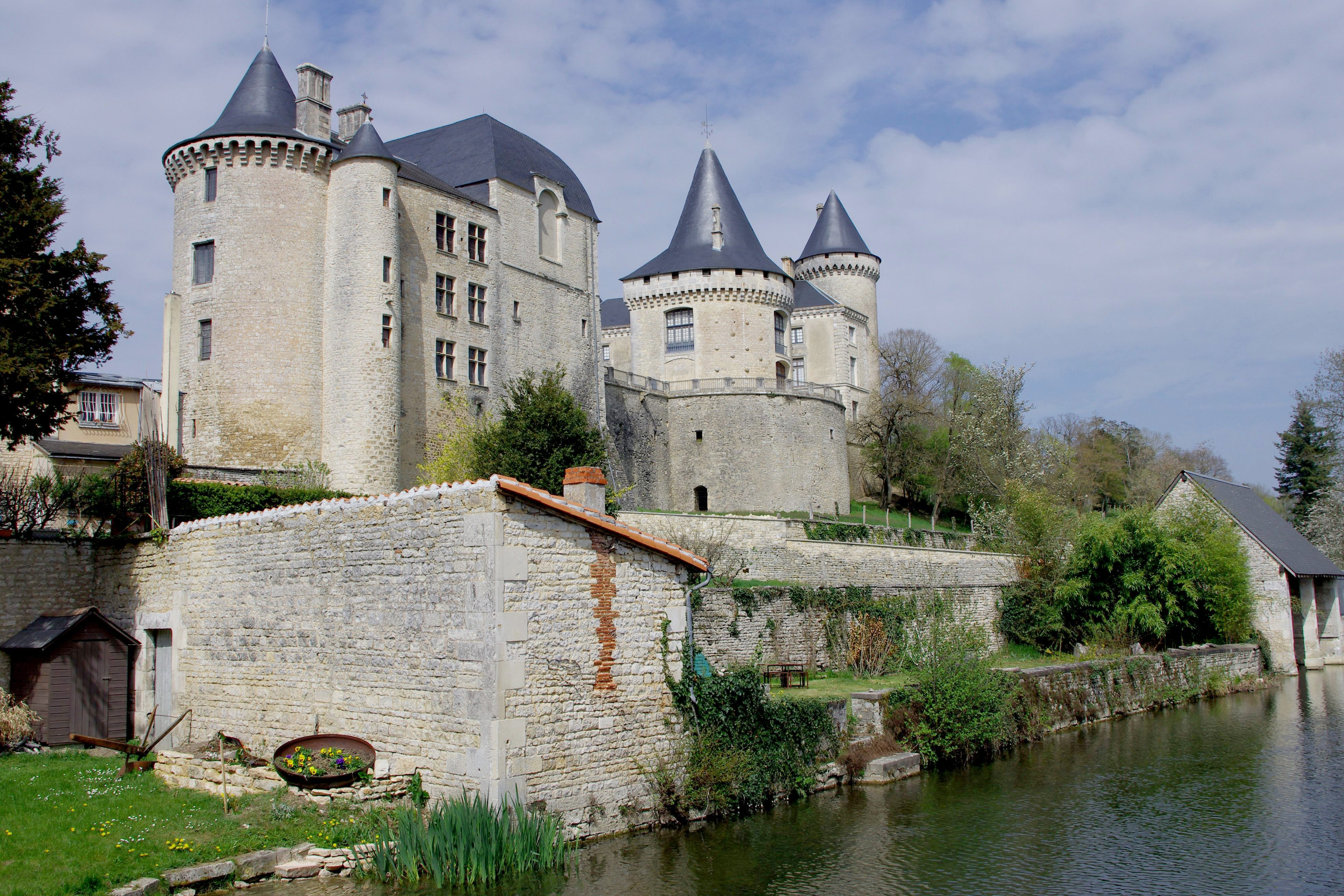
From the southeast, Charente river in foreground

King Philip VI of France (1293–1350) stayed at the castle in 1332. Due to the Anglo-French hostilities the castle was playing an increasingly important role. During the Hundred Years' War the English were given the castle from 1360 to 1385 by the Treaty of Brétigny. The castle was yielded reluctantly to Edward III of England's regent in France, John Chandos, on 25 October 1361. He had brought the brother of the keeper to the castle and threatened to behead him unless there was an immediate capitulation. French troops commanded by the Duke of Bouillon and Geoffroy III of Rochefoucauld laid siege to the castle in 1380, but it did not yield until five years later. The English later regained the castle, but in 1442 Charles VII of France (1403–61) finally captured it from the English.

The Rochefoucaulds, who had played a major role in the fight against the English, now began to ravish Angoulême. Charles VII returned, and this time destroyed the castle, largely by fire. However, the stones were recovered and the castle rebuilt. In 1446 the Rochefoucaulds managed to obtain the king's pardon and permission to build a defensive wall and two towers in Verteuil to restore the traditional refuge of the villagers. Under this pretext they made the castle among the best defended in France. The walls were not just restored but also reinforced using the latest techniques.

François I de La Rochefoucauld (died 1541) was the godfather of Francis I of France (1494–1547), who visited Verteuil in 1516. Anne de Polignac, widow of Count François II de la Rochefoucauld, received the Emperor Charles V (1500–1558) in Verteuil on 6 December 1539. Her mother's sister was the wife of the historian Philippe de Commines. She made many improvements to the château, and built the famous library. In 1558 King Henry II of France (1519–59) stayed at Verteuil with his son Charles, Duke of Orleans (1550–74), and his daughter Elizabeth (1545–68), the future wife of Philip II of Spain (1527–98).

=== Religious wars and Bourbon monarchy ===
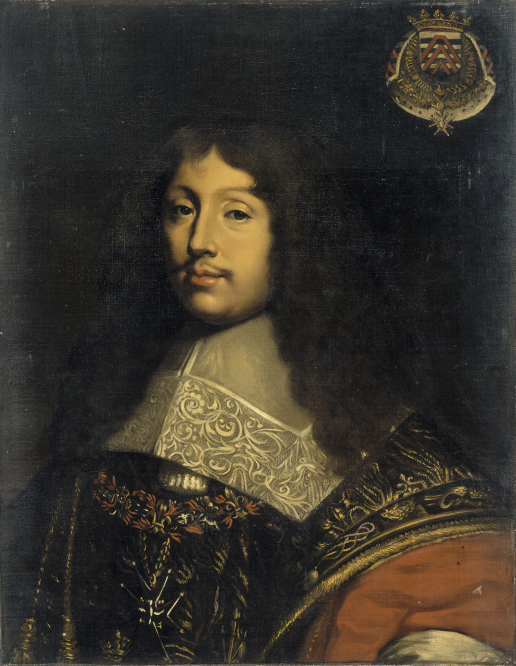
François VI, duc de la Rochefoucauld, writer (1613–80)

François III de La Rochefoucauld (1521–72) became brother-in-law of the Protestant Louis, Prince of Condé (1530–1569), and in 1560 organized a meeting at Verteuil between Condé and the Cardinal Georges d'Armagnac (c. 1501–1585) legate of Pope Pius IV, in an attempt to prevent further conflict. Two years later François III had thrown in his lot with the Protestants. In 1567 the 6th national synod of the Reformed Church of France was held at the château, and the next year it was a rallying point for Huguenot troops that came to the aid of La Rochelle when it was besieged by Catholics. The château was visited by the future king Henry IV of France (1553–1610), Catherine de' Medici (1519–89) and her daughter, Margaret (1553–1615), Louis XIII (1601–43), Anne of Austria (1601–66), and the Queen Mother Marie de' Medici (1575–1642).

In 1650 François VI, Duc de La Rochefoucauld (1613–1680) gathered more than 2,000 knights whom he led to Bordeaux to help the nobles in the second Fronde revolt. Soon after Charles de La Porte, Marshall of France and Duc de la Meilleraye (1602–64) attacked and took the castle with royal troops. He destroyed the Orangery and partially demolished the castle. The walls of the north wing were badly damaged, the towers dismantled, the drawbridge removed and the deep ditch that defended the northwest of the castle was partly filled. The castle remained habitable, and in 1651 was visited by the Prince de Conti, but he was forced to withdraw by soldiers of the Queen's regiment. They installed a garrison of 150 men at Verteuil.

François VI was exiled by Louis XIV (1638–1715) after the revolt. In 1652 François VI returned to the Château de Verteuil, where he spent most of his time until 1659 writing his Mémoires. He was restored to favor in 1662 and in 1665 published his Maximes. François died in Paris in 1680 but was buried in the Franciscan chapel of Verteuil, which had been founded in 1470 by his ancestor, John, 16th lord of Rochefoucauld and 13th lord of Verteuil. All of John's successors were buried in this chapel until the Reign of Terror began in 1793.

There were some distinguished visitors during the reign of Louis XV (1710–1774). Elisabeth Farnese (1692–1766) the second wife of Philip V of Spain (1683–1746), spent time at Verteuil. The English agronomist Arthur Young in his account of a Journey to France in 1787 gave a detailed and flattering description of Verteuil, praising the agricultural improvements and the life of the population.

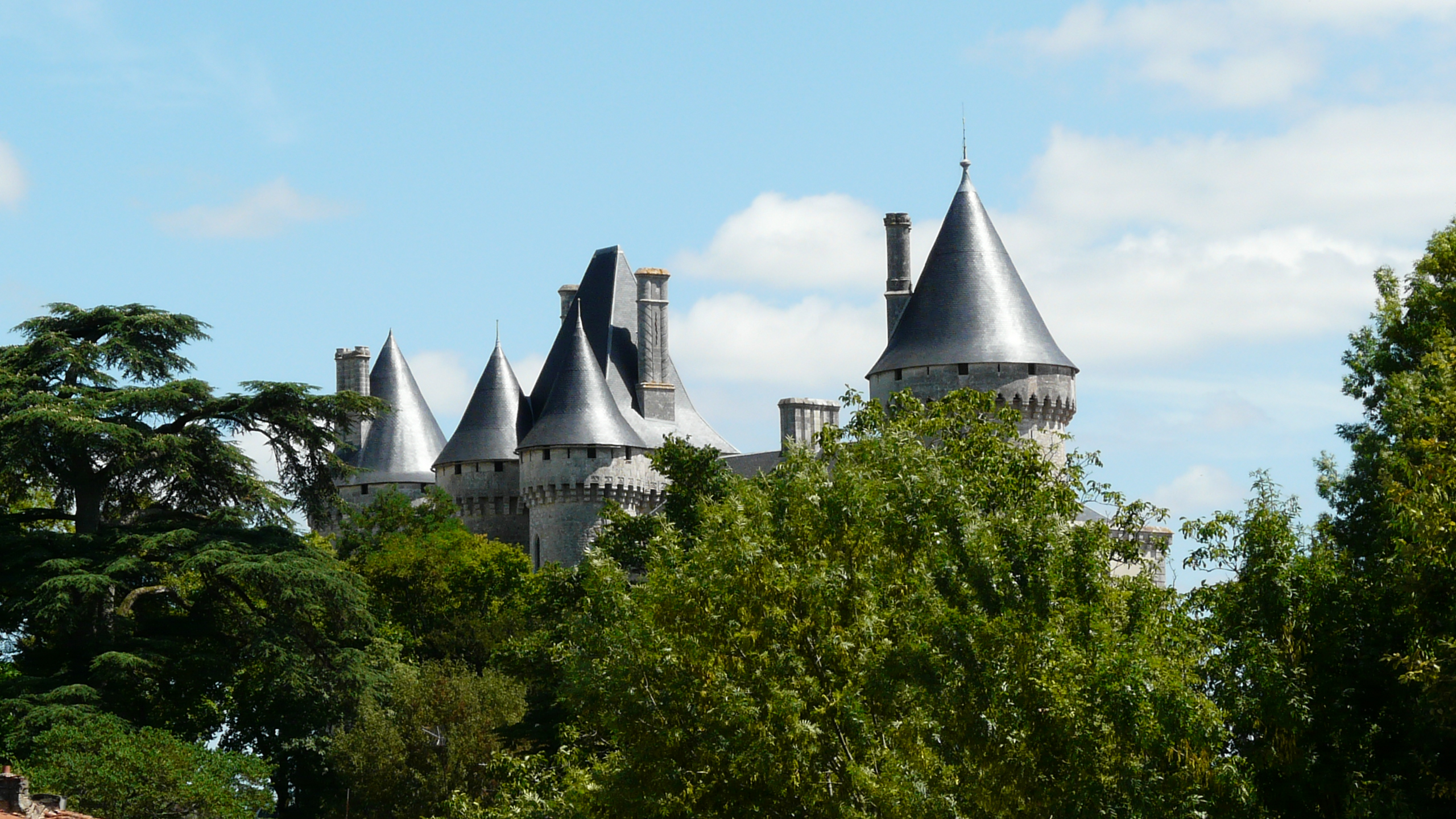
View from the park

=== French Revolution ===
At the time of the outbreak of the French Revolution (1789–99) there were excellent relations between the La Rochefoucauld family and the people of Verteuil. According to Marquis de Amodio, nothing might have happened to the château if it had not been for Ruffec's Committee of Public Safety and the Convention member Gilbert Romme, who is credited with burning most of the archives at Verteuil and thirty portraits. A fire accident occurred in 1793 that destroyed the large gallery that connected the chapel to the north tower, and the west face of the large central tower was seriously damaged. The fire spread along the roofs and turrets of the northwest wing, and the upper part of the north tower was also burned. The chapel was sacked, and the flames destroyed its facade and part of its north wall. The crypt was not damaged. Most of the floors and fireplaces in the château and all the doors, windows and woodwork were irreparably destroyed.

=== Later years ===
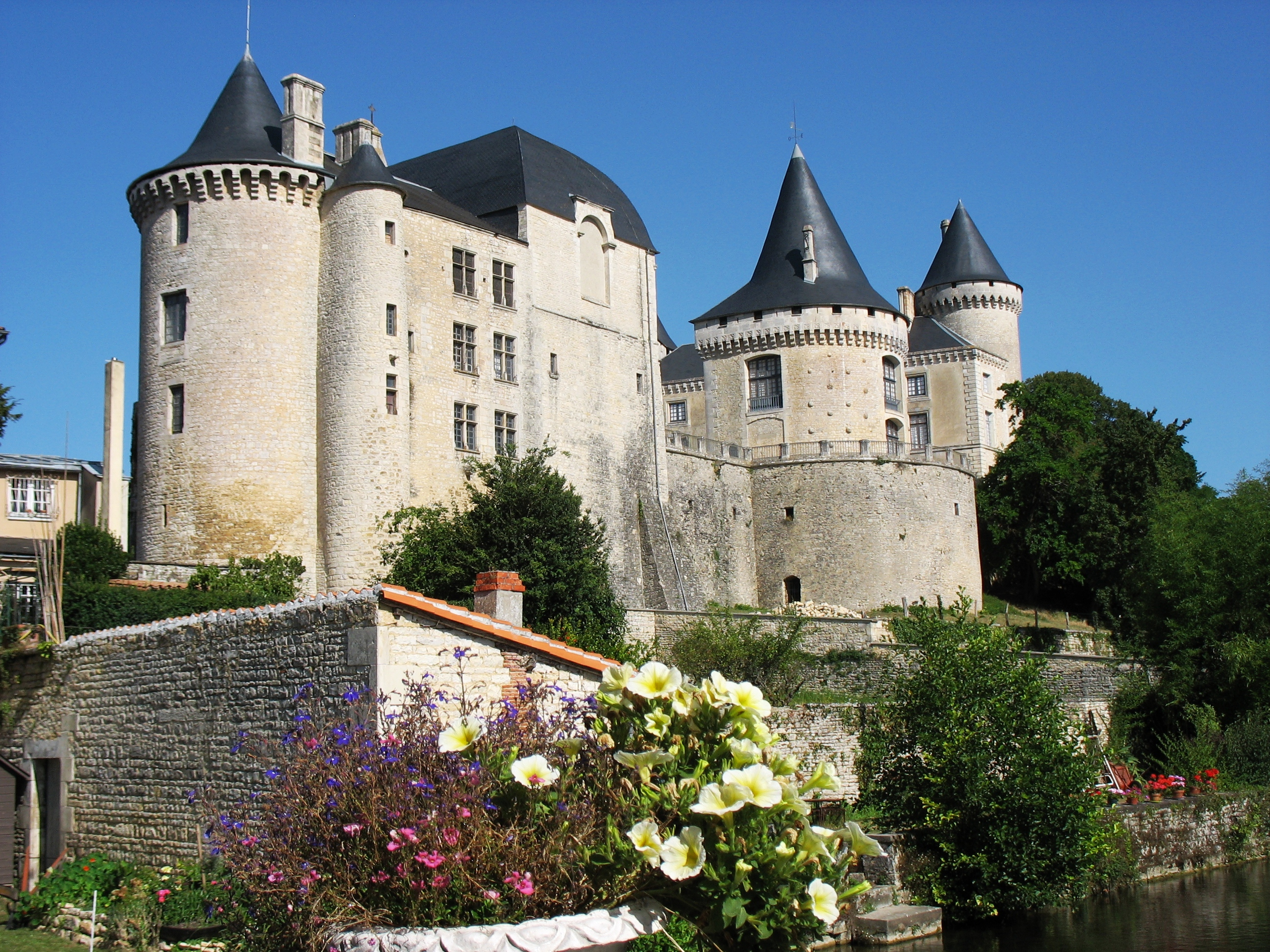
The château in 2012

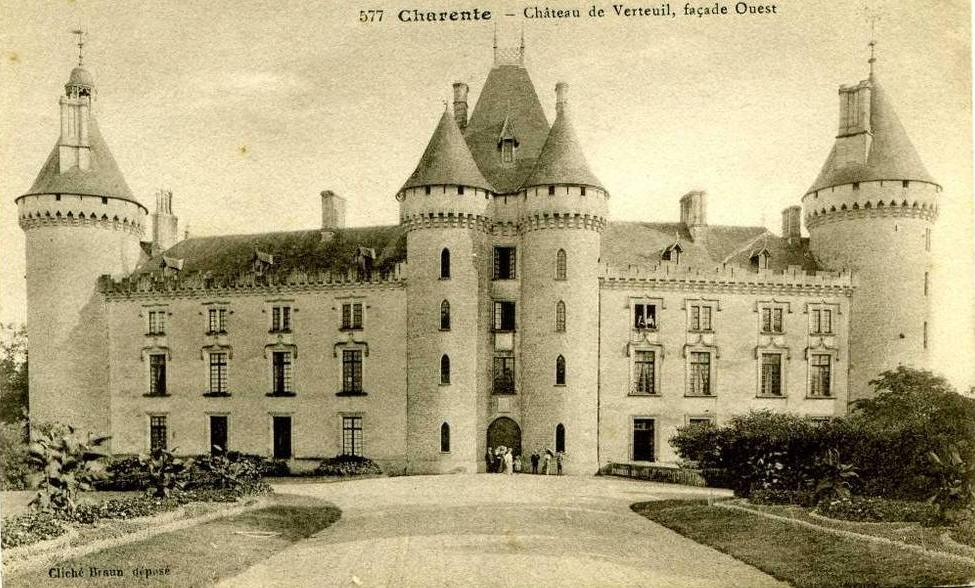
Northwest facade with the main entrance and the two flanking wings

After the Revolution the senior branch of the Rochefoucauld family regained possession. The château was renovated in the first half of the 19th century. The work was undertaken by the La Villéons in the romantic style that accompanied the Bourbon Restoration after 1815. They added decorations to the windows and made false arrow slots, added two towers to the south facade, added a flamboyant balustrade and dormer windows, and made changes to part of the chapel.

During the Second French Empire (1852–70) further changes were made, mainly to the interior. Hippolyte de La Rochefoucauld (1804–63), who had been minister plenipotentiary in Germany and Florence, brought a fine collection of furniture and 18th-century Venetian glass chandeliers when he retired. He restored the great stone staircase. Influenced by Eugène Viollet-le-Duc he decided to transform the large East tower into a library. He blocked up the old openings and pierced large new windows in the old walls. He commissioned a copy of the statue by Didier Début on the facade of the Hôtel de Ville, Paris of the author of the Maximes.

During World War II (1939–45) the château housed French troops and refugees from Alsace-Lorraine in 1940. For several months it was partially occupied by some German units. In 1944 some members of the maquis were hidden there. Various extremely interesting archaeological finds have been made since the war. Research started by Count Gabriel de La Rochefoucauld, which had been interrupted by the war, uncovered a buried part of the castle dating to the 12th and 13th centuries, including the room that housed the drawbridge mechanism. A 12th-century stairway was discovered that led down to a lower chapel from the 11th century, in excellent condition, whose existence was completely unknown before 1958. Various other traces of the early buildings have been found.

The château was listed as a monument historique on 31 March 1966, with the facades, roofs and substructure protected. The site was completely protected on 4 April 2017 as it was believed that the château, the interior courtyard and the land to the north may hold archaeological remains.

== Architecture ==
=== Exterior ===
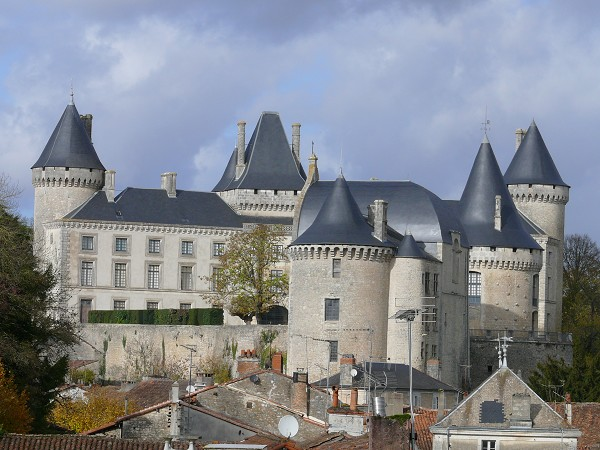
Rear view from the south, with curtain wall and library tower in foreground

The present château with its five conical towers and watchtower capped by slate roofs began to be built in the 15th century, and was altered and extended several times since then. A park was built in the 19th century through which a wide driveway brought visitors to the main building. This is based on a central square tower with a pyramidal roof. The square keep is the main remaining part of the medieval structure. The present building is designed on a triangular plan. The large tower at the tip of the triangle is the medieval gatehouse, from which wings extend on either side. An isolated tower that now has the library on two floors divides the curtain wall on the east.

The buildings in the southeast were scarcely affected by the 19th-century restoration apart from the chapel. Many of the walls of the 12th-century tower have survived, partly rebuilt in the 15th century, and there are traces of a Romanesque chapel. The park was redesigned in the 19th century, enclosed in dry stone walls with several entrances. These have since been removed, as have the luxuriant gardens of the 18th century. Some traces remain in the form of boxwood, some alleys, the pools on the two terraces and the rockery.

=== Interior ===
An inventory was made in 1728 after the death of Duke Francois VIII. The library contained 1,069 works. The master bedroom included an elegant bed with sumptuous fittings of violet velvet embroidered in gold and silver, armchairs upholstered in the same velvet, a large Turkish rug in an alcove, a walnut table and other items. The architect Frantz Jourdain renovated the interior of the 14th-century tower as a library for the Rochefoucault family in 1893. He designed it as a "chapelle intellectuelle" to display memorabilia of the famous author. Adrien Karbowsky contributed decorative murals to the room. Hippolyte's son, Count Aimery de La Rochefoucauld continued to collect the souvenirs of his ancestors, turning the château into a sort of family museum. He redecorated the chapel and added stained glass windows.

== The Hunt of the Unicorn tapestries ==
Seven of The Hunt of the Unicorn tapestries were recorded in a 1680 inventory of the Paris possessions of Duke Francois VI. From various symbolic motifs, the tapestries seem to have been made to celebrate a marriage, probably that of Anne of Brittany (1477–1514) and Louis XII (1462–1515). The royal arms of Louis and Anne would have once decorated the sky in most of the tapestries.

The 1728 inventory recorded five of The Hunt of the Unicorn tapestries hanging in the château's master bedroom. The tapestries, which were then well over two hundred years old, were almost half worn out. Two more of the tapestries were in "a large lower hall near the chapel, presently serving as a storage place for furniture". They were described as "two pieces of tapestry of the Unicorn, torn in various places".

During the French Revolution, Ruffec's Comité de Surveillance ruled that the old tapestries of the château could be preserved, since they bore no royal insignia. It seems that the insignia had been cut out so the tapestries would not be destroyed by the mob when the château was looted in 1793. They were taken by peasants who used them to protect their potatoes from freezing and to cover their espalier trees.

Count Hippolyte rediscovered the Unicorn tapestries of the château in the 1850s, being used by a peasant to cover vegetables in his barn. After being restored they were hung in a salon of the château in 1856. Xavier Barbier de Montault saw the tapestries at Verteuil in the 1880s and said that, although "somewhat restored, [they] are of a freshness and of an incomparable grace".

In 1923, the tapestries were sold to John D. Rockefeller Jr. and shipped to New York, where they are now on display in The Cloisters medieval galleries.

== Gallery ==
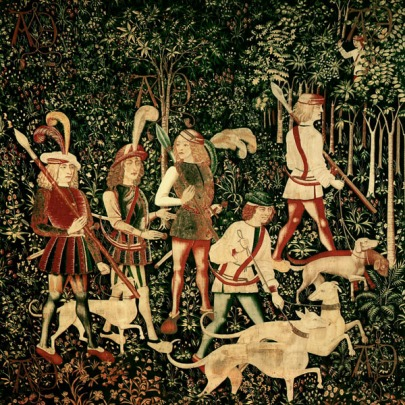
The Hunters Enter the Woods

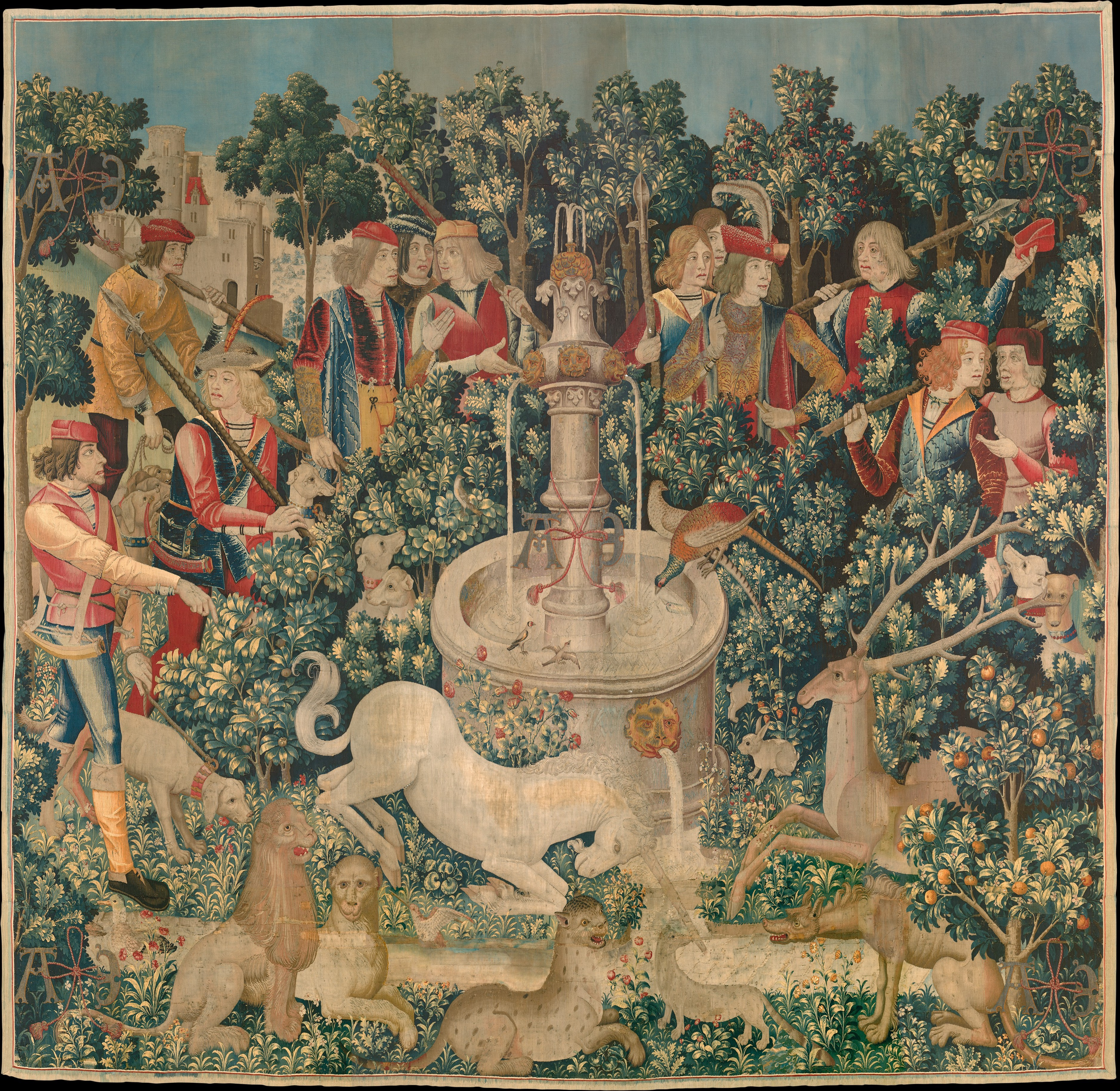
The Unicorn is Found

The Unicorn is Attacked

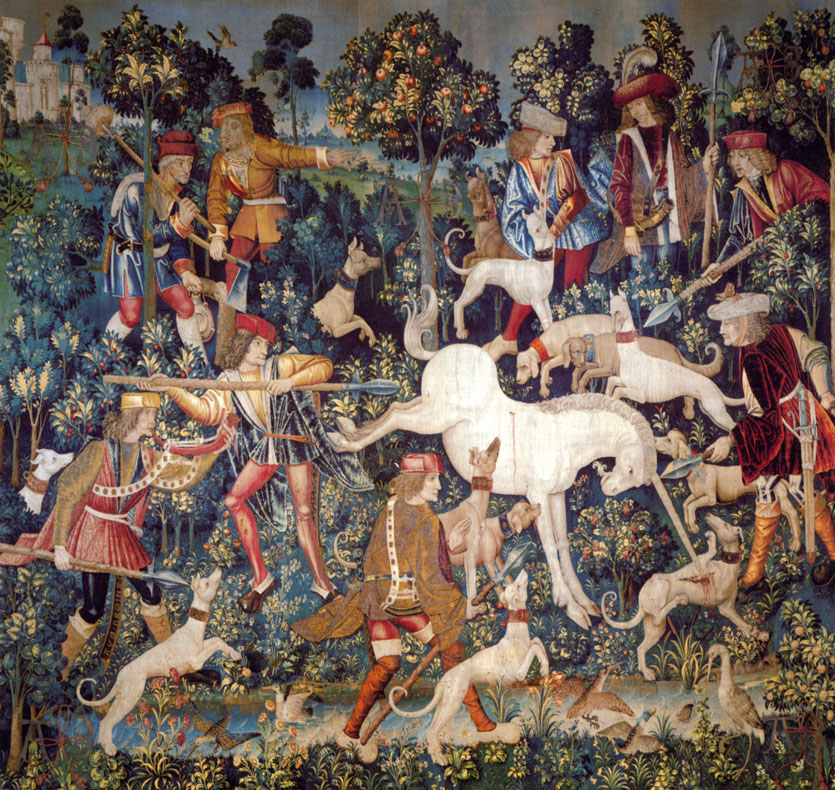
The Unicorn Defends Itself
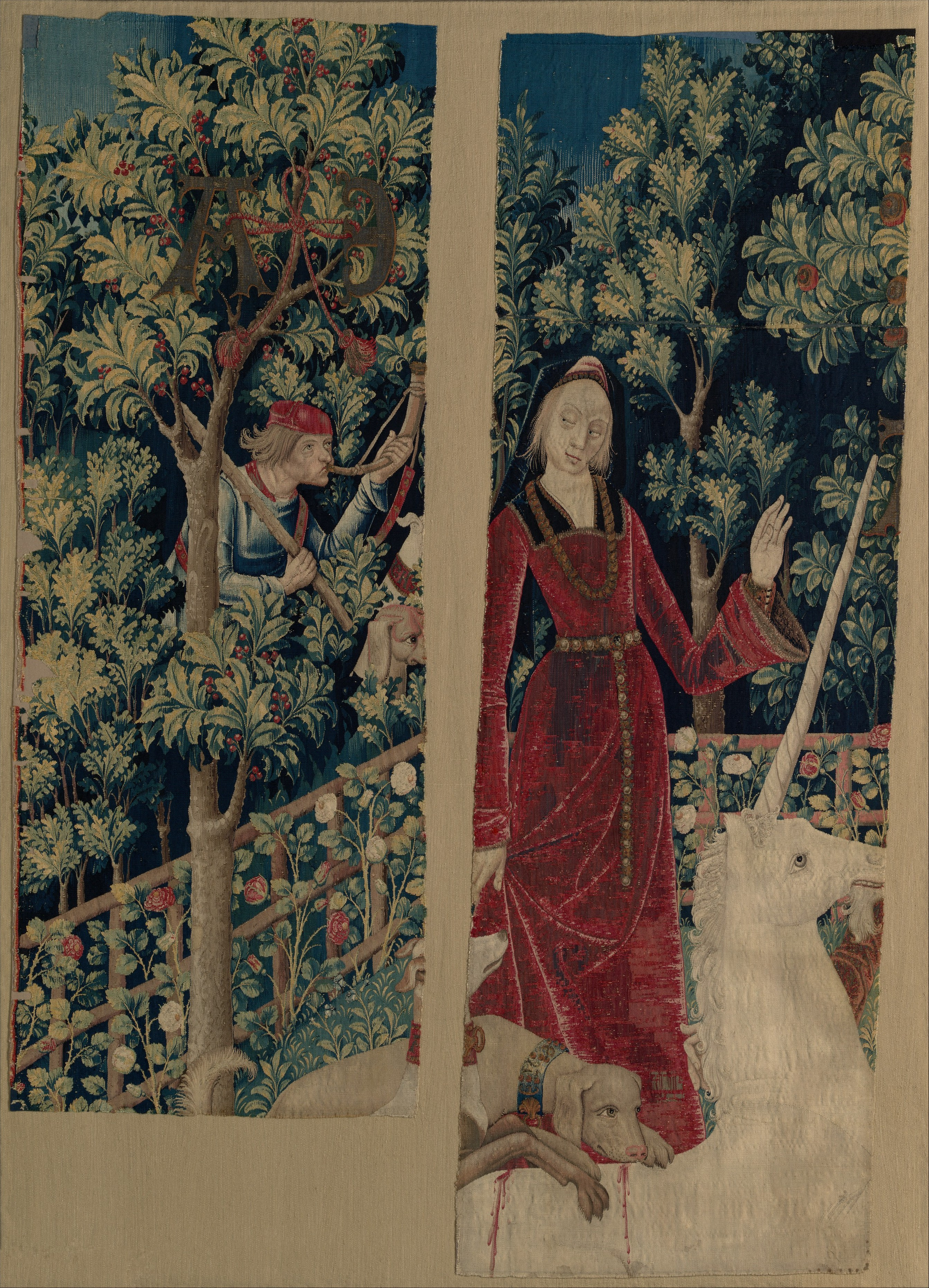
The two Fragments of The Mystic Capture of the Unicorn

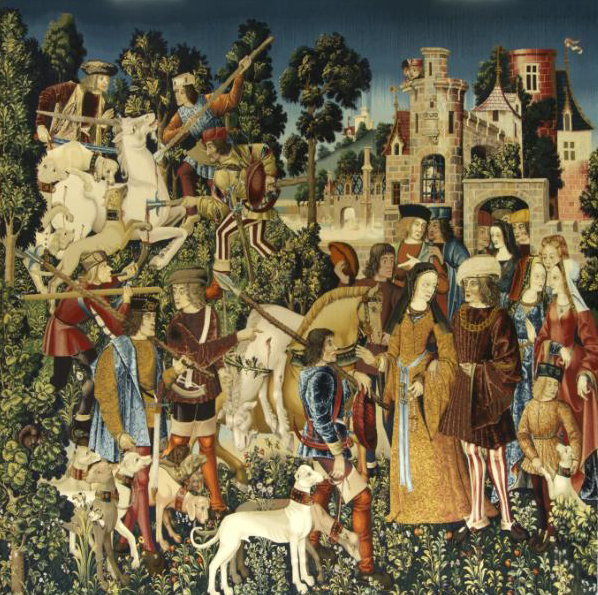
The Unicorn is Killed and Brought to the Castle

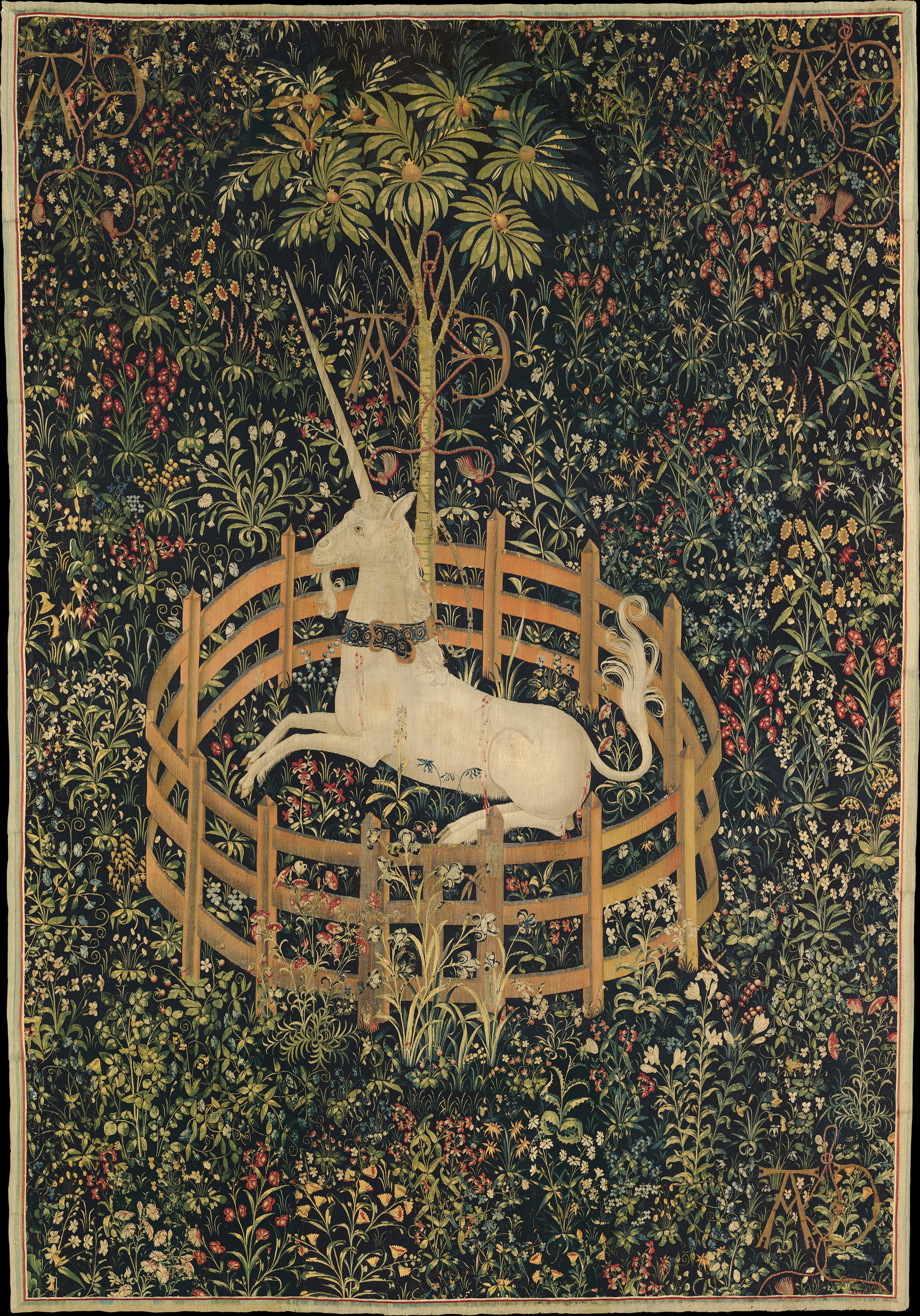
The Unicorn is in Captivity and No Longer Dead

== See also ==
- List of castles in France

== Sources ==
- Cavallo, Adolph S. (1 January 1998). The Unicorn Tapestries at the Metropolitan Museum of Art. Metropolitan Museum of Art. ISBN 978-0-87099-868-3.
- "Château de Verteuil". En Charente (in French). Panoglobe. Archived from the original on 23 March 2015.
- "Château de Verteuil". Base Mérimée (in French). Ministry of Culture. 2020.
- Clausen, Meredith L. (1987). Décoration & Le Rationalisme Architecturaux a L'Exposition Universelle. Brill Archive. ISBN 90-04-07879-7.
- Fleury, Paul de (1886). Inventaire des meubles existant dans les chateaux de La Rochefoucauld, de Verteuil et de La Terne à la mort de Francois VIII de La Rochefoucauld (1728): publie d'apres l'original des archives de La Charente (in French). Imprimerie G. Chasseignac.
- Freeman, Margaret Beam (1 January 1976). The Unicorn Tapestries. Metropolitan Museum of Art. ISBN 978-0-87099-147-9.
- George, Sandie (2015). "Verteuil-sur-Charente – a hidden gem of a village". Discover ... The French Atlantic Coast. R et M Media Agency. Archived from the original on 2 April 2015.
- "Le Cadre" (in French). Réception parc château de Verteuil. Archived from the original on 2 April 2015.
- Marquis de Amodio (1958). "Le Château de Verteuil" (PDF) (in French). Société Archéologique et Historique de la Charente.
