= Henri Dehérain =

French historian and geographer

Henri Dehérain (31 March 1867 - 22 February 1941) was a French historian and geographer.

Dehérain won three prizes from the Académie française: the Prix Thiers for Le Soudan égyptien sous Méhémet-Ali in 1898, the Prix Montyon for Études sur l’Afrique in 1905, and the Prix Broquette-Gonin for Travaux sur l’Égypte et sur le Proche-Orient, le Cap, l’Abyssinie au point de vue de l’influence française in 1935.
