= Frédéric Gaëtan de La Rochefoucauld, Marquis of Liancourt =

Arms of Frédéric Gaëtan, Marquis of Liancourt

Frédéric Gaëtan de La Rochefoucauld, Marquis of Liancourt (1779–1863), the third son of François Alexandre Frédéric, duc de la Rochefoucauld-Liancourt, was a French nobleman who, during Napoléon's brief 1815 return to power, fled to Switzerland and tried to organise a volunteer army in support of the restored French monarchy of Louis XVIII.

In 1827, the marquis was named chairman of the electoral college in Morbihan and in 1827 was elected to the French Chamber of deputies for Cher, holding the seat almost uninterrupted until 1846.

He took no part in politics after 1848 and became a zealous philanthropist and a partisan of constitutional monarchy. The marquis wrote on social questions, notably on prison administration; he edited the works of La Rochefoucauld, and the memoirs of Condorcet; and he was the author of some vaudevilles, tragedies and poems.
