= François Baron de Tott =

French-Slovak officer and aristocrat (1733–1793)

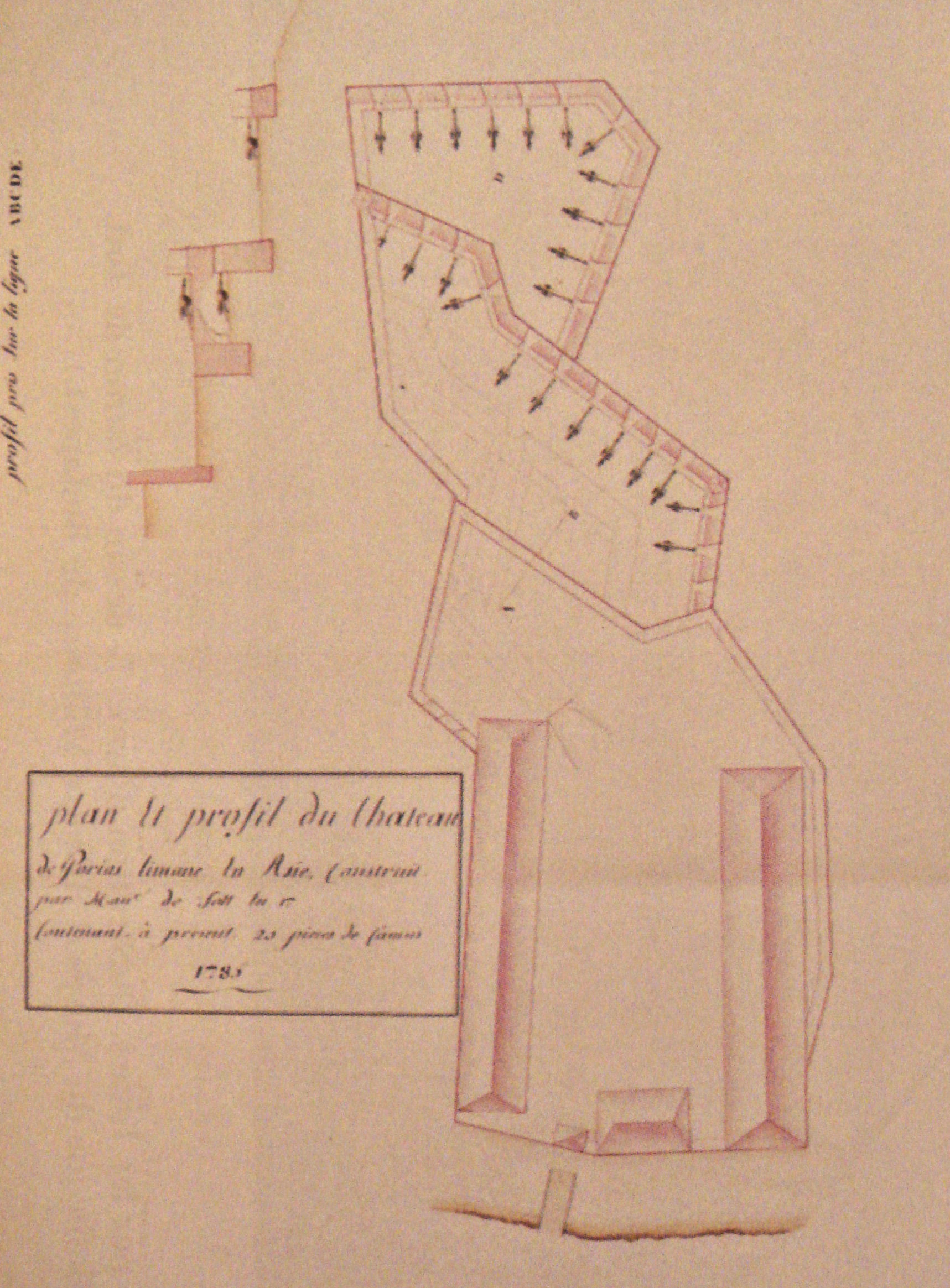
A fortification built by the Baron de Tott for the Ottoman Empire during the Russo-Turkish War (1768–1774).

François Baron de Tott (Hungarian: Báró Tóth Ferenc, Slovak: barón František Tóth) (August 17, 1733, Chamigny, France – September 24, 1793, Hungary) was an aristocrat and a French military officer of Hungarian origin. Born on August 17, 1733, in Chamigny, a village in northern France, the descendant of a Hungarian nobleman, who had emigrated to the Ottoman Empire and then moved on to France with the cavalry of Count Miklós Bercsényi, and was later raised to the rank of baron.

== Career ==
As a youngster, François joined the regiment his father was serving in, and in 1754 was promoted to the rank of Lieutenant. In 1755 he travelled to Constantinople, the capital city of the Ottoman Empire, as the secretary of his uncle Charles Gravier, comte de Vergennes, who had been appointed ambassador. His main duty was to learn the Turkish language, to investigate the situation in the Ottoman Empire and to gather information about the Crimean Khanate.

He returned to Paris in 1763, and was sent to Switzerland in 1766 by the French government. In 1767, he was appointed consul in Crimea in order to learn about the country and incite the Crimean Tatars to rebel against the Imperial Russia. François de Tott played a major role during the Russo-Turkish War (1768–1774). Leaving Crimea for a while, he was commissioned by the Ottoman government with the task of defending the Dardanelles against the Russian fleet.

Following in the footprints of Claude Alexandre de Bonneval, known as Humbaracı Ahmed Pasha, François de Tott was involved in the reform efforts for the Ottoman military. He succeeded in having a new foundry built to make howitzers, and was instrumental in the creation of mobile artillery units. He built fortifications on the Bosphorus and started a naval science course that laid the foundation stone for the later naval school.

He travelled across the Ottoman Empire, visiting coastal cities around the Mediterranean Sea, mainly Alexandria, Aleppo, Smyrna, Salonika and Tunis. He also prospected the area for the construction of a canal in Suez.

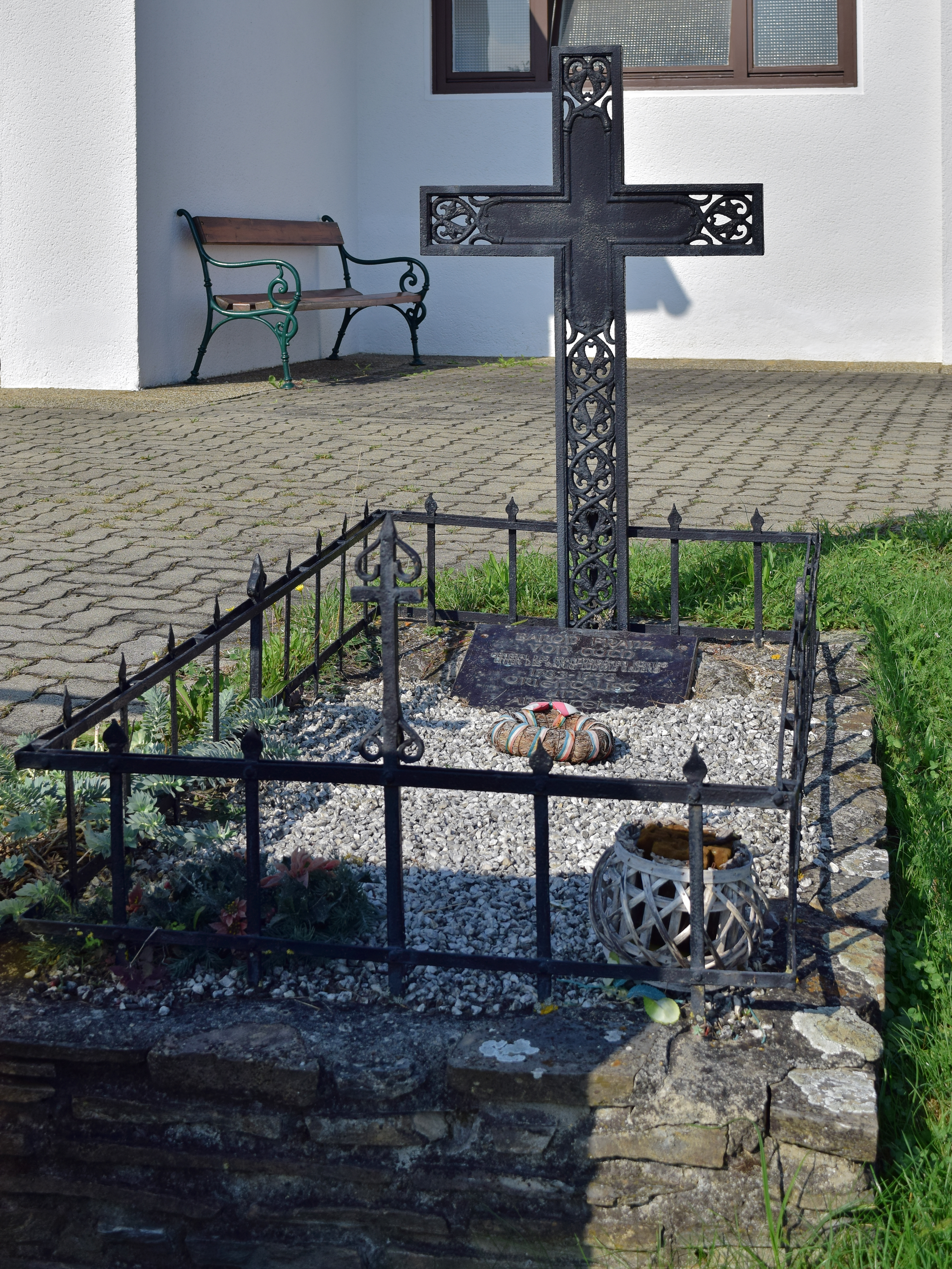
Tott's grave in Bad Tatzmannsdorf

François Baron de Tott's Memoirs were published in four volumes. He returned to Hungary from Switzerland, where he had moved after the French Revolution. He died on September 24, 1793, in Hungary.

Tott was the father of artist Sophie de Tott.

== See also ==
- Franco-Ottoman alliance
- Campbell Mustafa Ağa

== Bibliography ==
- Tott (Baron Ferenc de), Memoires du Baron de Tott Sur les Turcs et les Tartares, Amsterdam, 1784 and 1785, 203 pp., 220 pp., 180 pp. and 152 pp. and Paris 1785 in two Volumes, 273 pp., 264 pp. Volumes 1 and 2 of the 1784 edition, and volumes 1, 2, and 3 of a 1785 English translation.
- Deherain (Henri), La mission du baron de Tott et de Pierre Ruffin auprès du khan de Crimée, Revue de l'histoire des colonies françaises, 1923, 1-32 (in French)
- Farnaud (Christophe), Culture et politique: la mission secrète du baron de Tott au Levant, mémoire de maîtrise, université de Paris-IV, 1988 (in French)
- Font-Reaulx (Anne de), Présence française dans l'Empire ottoman au XVIIIe siècle: le baron de Tott (1733-1793), in Position des thèses de l'Ecole des Chartes, 1964, 65-69 (in French)
- Laulan (Robert), Un artilleur français improvisé à Constantinople au XVIIIe siècle, le baron de Tott, Revue de l'artillerie, 1932, CX, 343-363, 392-411 et 460-481 (in French)
- Peyssonnel (Claude Charles de), Lettres de M. de Peyssonnel, ancien consul à Smyrne, contenant quelques observations relatives aux mémoires qui ont paru sous le nom de Baron de Tott, Amsterdam, 1785 (in French)
- Saman (Edouard), François de Tott, diplomate et baron de Louis XVI, Marseille, 118, 1979, 84-95 (in French)
- Vissière (I.): " Les Turcs du baron de Tott ", in La Méditerranée au XVIIIe siècle, CAER, Université de Provence, 1987, 251-272 (in French)
