= Château de Rastignac =

Country house in Dordogne, France

Coordinates: 45°08′55″N 1°08′21″E

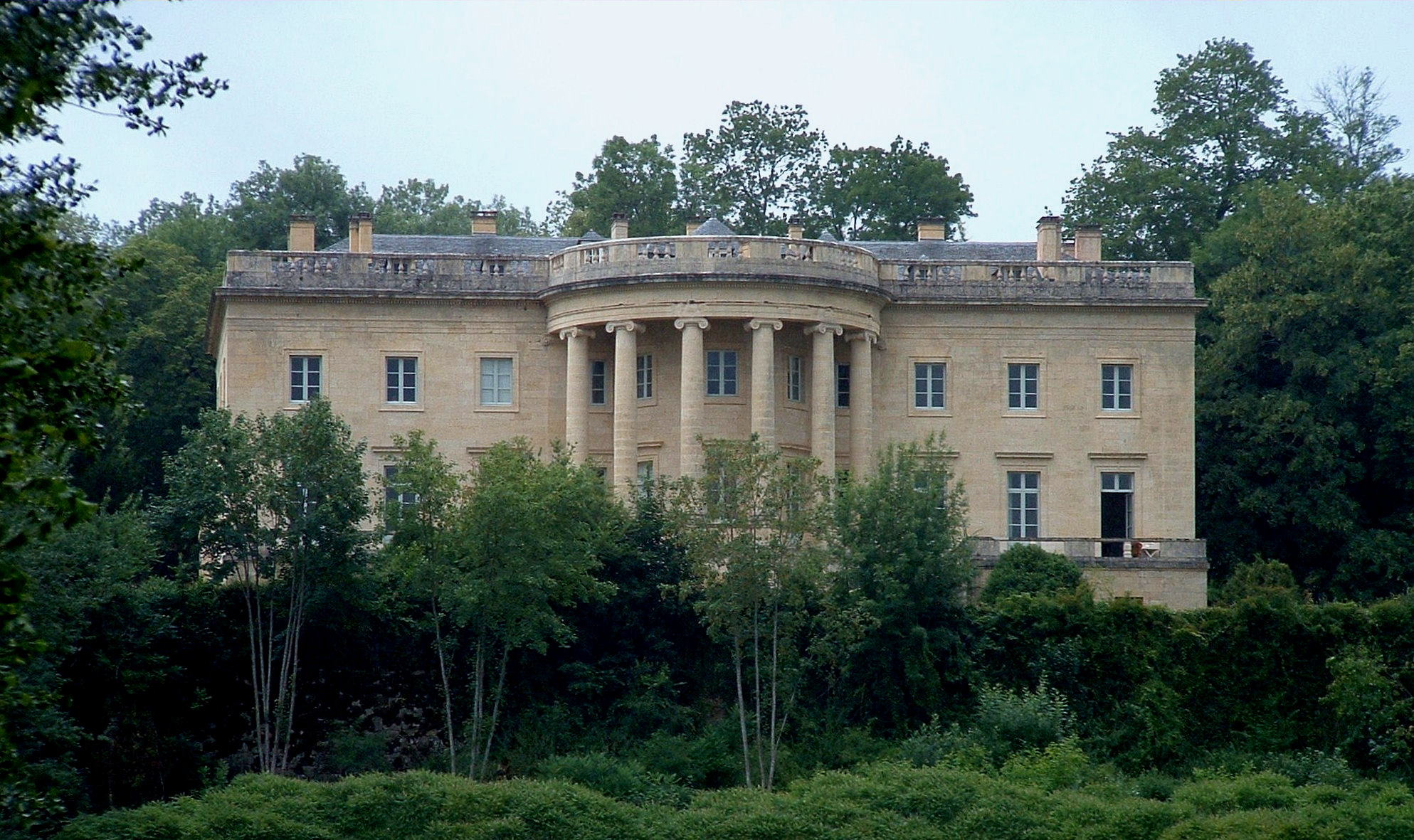
Château de Rastignac

The Château de Rastignac is a neoclassical style country house located in La Bachellerie, near Bordeaux in the Dordogne in France. It was built between 1789 and 1817 to designs by the architect Mathurin Salat (1755–1822), sometimes called "Blanchard". The house was built of limestone by the Marquis de Rastignac.

== History ==
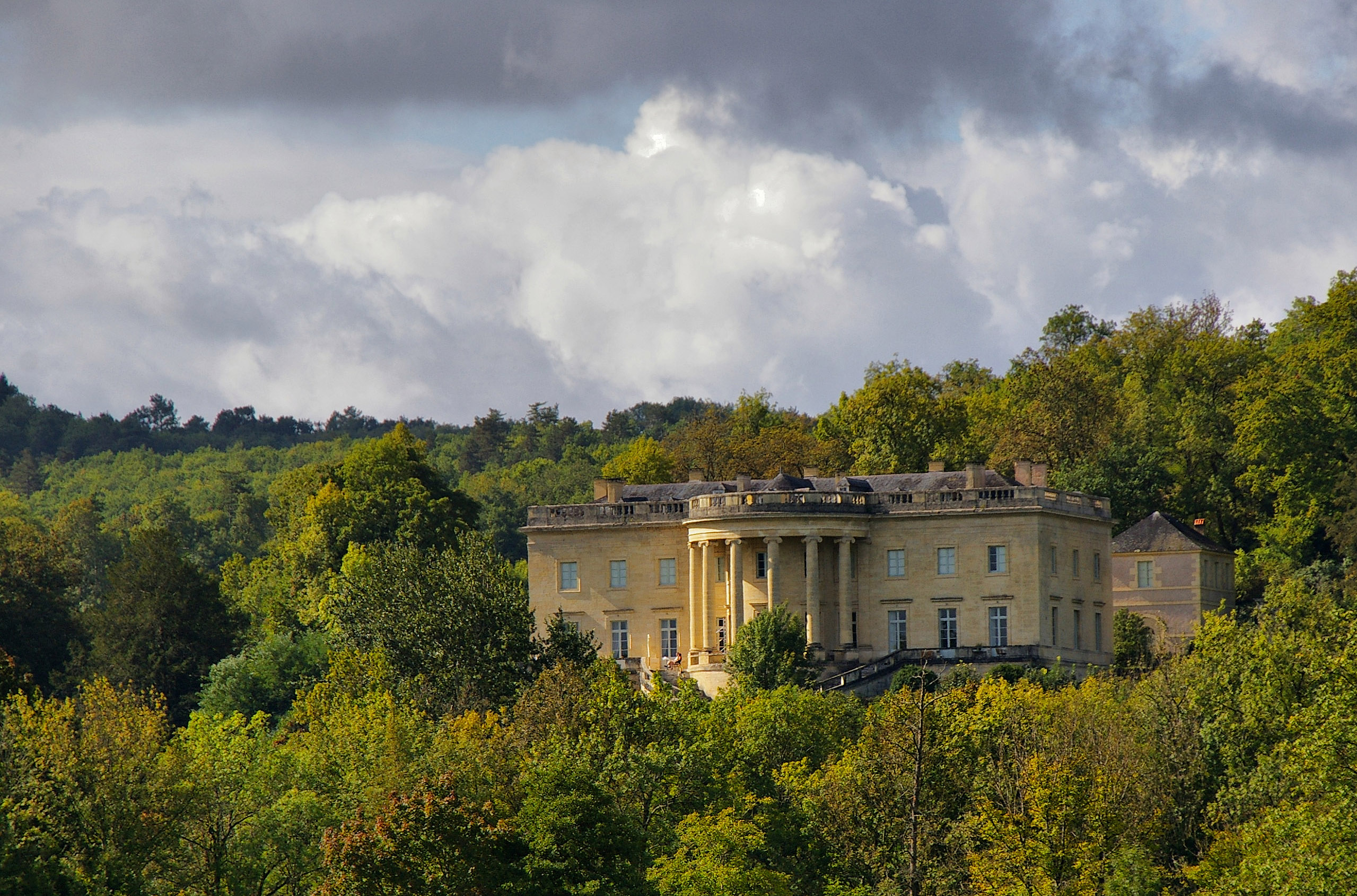
Château de Rastignac

Construction of the château was delayed by disruptions from the French Revolution and Napoleonic Wars. When completed, the house was decorated in the French Empire style.

In 1944, fleeing Nazi Schutzstaffel (SS) forces attempted to destroy the Château de Rastignac in retribution against the French Resistance. Using phosphorus as an accelerant, the fire burned for five days. Only the exterior limestone shell survived. After eight years the structure was stabilized and a roof placed overhead for protection.

The semi-circular Ionic portico of the Château de Rastignac is frequently compared with Maison carrée d'Arlac and the South Portico of the White House, and there have been speculations about the possible influences of one house on the other. The first official White House guide, published in 1962, suggested a link between Hoban's design for the South Portico and Château de Rastignac. Though James Hoban, the original White House architect, did not visit the region, the third American president, Thomas Jefferson (who had conducted architectural revisions of the White House) did visit the region and met architect Salat earlier, while serving as United States ambassador to France. Supporters of a connection posit that Thomas Jefferson, during his tour of Bordeaux in 1789, viewed Salat's architectural drawings (which were on-file at the College) at the École Spéciale d'Architecture (Bordeaux Architectural College). They further speculate, without proof, that on his return to the U.S. Jefferson may have shared the idea with Washington, Hoban, Monroe, and Benjamin Henry Latrobe.

Reconstruction of the château's interior spaces was completed in 2003 and it is now divided into seven residential apartments (five for the main building, and two for the former coach house).
