= François de La Rochefoucauld, 7th Duke of La Rochefoucauld =

Duke of France (1747–1827)

François Alexandre Frédéric de La Rochefoucauld
- 7th Duke of La Rochefoucauld
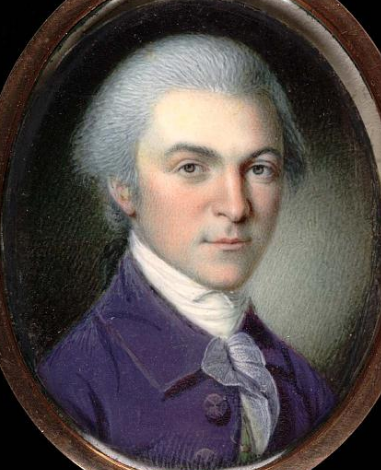
- Tenure: 1792-1827
- Other names: Duke of Liancourt; Duke of Estissac
- Known for: social reform; vaccination
- Born: 11 January 1747; La Roche Guyon
- Died: 27 March 1827 (aged 80)

François Alexandre Frédéric de La Rochefoucauld, 7th Duke of La Rochefoucauld, 1st Duke of Liancourt, 2nd Duke of Estissac (French pronunciation: [fʁɑ̃swa alɛksɑ̃dʁ fʁedeʁik də la ʁɔʃfuko]; 11 January 1747 – 27 March 1827) was a French social reformer.

== Early life ==
He was born at La Roche Guyon, the son of François Armand de La Rochefoucauld, duc d'Estissac, grand master of the royal wardrobe. One of his cousins was Louis Alexandre de La Rochefoucauld d'Enville. Known as the duc de Liancourt in infancy, he became an officer of carbineers, and married at seventeen. A visit to England seems to have suggested the establishment of a model farm at Liancourt, where he reared cattle imported from England and Switzerland. He also set up spinning machines on his estate, and founded a school, École nationale supérieure d'arts et métiers, for the sons of soldiers, which became in 1788 the École des Enfants de la Patrie under royal protection. In 2008, this school was renamed Arts et Métiers ParisTech.

== French Revolution ==
Frédéric de Liancourt was elected to the Estates-General of 1789, where he sought in vain to support the monarchy while furthering social reform. On 14 July, following the storming of the Bastille, he warned Louis XVI of the state of affairs in Paris, and met his exclamation that there was a revolt with the answer, "Non, sire, c'est une révolution." ("No, Sire, it is a revolution.") On 18 July, he became president of the National Constituent Assembly. Established in command of a military division in Normandy, he offered Louis a refuge in Rouen, and, failing in this effort, assisted him with a large sum of money.

== Exile ==
After the insurrection of 10 August 1792, he fled to England, where he was the guest of Arthur Young. There also he met Young's nieces by marriage, Frances and Sarah Burney. The former gives a long description of him in her journal. After the assassination of his cousin, Louis Alexandre de La Rochefoucauld d'Enville, at Gisors on 14 September 1792 he assumed the title of duc de La Rochefoucauld.

He left England in 1794, and travelled to the United States. In 1795, he and five associates began a tour which covered much of the northern United States and Upper Canada. They crossed the Niagara River to Fort Erie and also saw Fort Chippawa. From there they travelled to Newark, Canada where they were entertained by Lieutenant Governor John Graves Simcoe. Their trip was cut short when they were prohibited from entering Lower Canada. François Alexandre Frédéric returned to the US and, in 1799, his exile ended, he returned to France.

== Return to France ==
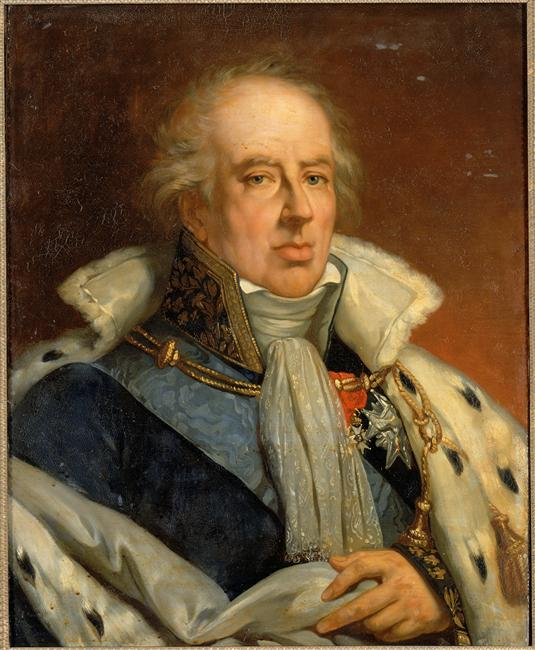
François Alexandre Frédéric, duc de la Rochefoucauld-Liancourt

On his return to Paris, he was treated with dignity, but distantly by Napoleon. At the Restoration he entered the House of Peers, but Louis XVIII refused to reinstate him as master of the wardrobe, although his father had paid 400,000 francs for the honour. Successive governments, revolutionary and otherwise, recognized the value of his institutions at Liancourt, and he was for twenty-three years government inspector of his school, École nationale supérieure d'arts et métiers, which had been removed to Châlons-en-Champagne.

The 19 member jury for the 5th Exposition des produits de l'industrie française was chosen in May 1819, with the Duc de la Rochefoucauld as president and Jean-Antoine Chaptal as vice-president and rapporteur. Chaptal had arranged the 2nd and 3rd expositions, and again played a leading role. The 5th exposition opened on 25 August 1819 in the great halls of the Louvre palace.

Rochefoucauld was one of the first promoters of vaccination in France; he established a dispensary in Paris, and he was an active member of the central boards of administration for hospitals, prisons and agriculture. His opposition to the government in the House of Peers led to his removal in 1823 from the honorary positions he held, while the vaccination committee, of which he was president, was suppressed. The academies of science and of medicine admitted him to their membership by way of protest. Official hostility pursued him even after his death, for the old pupils of his school were charged by the military at his funeral.

== Works ==
His works, chiefly on economic questions, include books on the English system of taxation, poor-relief and education.

== Family ==
His eldest son, François, duc de La Rochefoucauld (1765–1848), succeeded his father in the House of Peers. The second, Alexandre, comte de La Rochefoucauld (1767–1841), married Adélaïde de Pyvart de Chastullé, a San Domingo heiress allied to the Beauharnais family. Mme de La Rochefoucauld became dame d'honneur to the empress Josephine, and their eldest daughter married Francesco Borghese, a brother-in-law of Pauline Bonaparte, Princess Borghese. La Rochefoucauld became ambassador successively to Vienna (1805) and to The Hague (1808–1810), where he negotiated the union of the Kingdom of Holland with France. During the "Hundred Days" he was made a peer of France. He subsequently devoted himself to philanthropic work, and in 1822 became deputy to the Chamber of Deputies and sat with the constitutional royalists. He was again raised to the peerage in 1831.

His descendants became Dukes of Estissac and Princes of La Rochefoucauld-Montbel (Dominique and his son Gabriel). The third son, Frederic Gaetan, marquis de La Rochefoucauld-Liancourt (1779–1863), was a zealous philanthropist and a partisan of constitutional monarchy. He took no part in politics after 1848. The marquis wrote on social questions, notably on prison administration; he edited the works of La Rochefoucauld, and the memoirs of Condorcet; and he was the author of some vaudevilles, tragedies and poems.

== Additional references consulted ==
- Goyau, Pierre-Louis-Théophile-Georges (1910). "The Duke of La Rochefoucauld-Liancourt" . In Herbermann, Charles (ed.). Catholic Encyclopedia. Vol. 9. New York: Robert Appleton Company.
- Webster, T. S. (1987). "LA ROCHEFOUCAULD, FRANÇOIS-ALEXANDRE-FRÉDÉRIC DE, Duc de LA ROCHEFOUCAULD-LIANCOURT, Duc d'ESTISSAC". Dictionary of Canadian Biography Online.

French nobility
Preceded by Louis Alexandre de La Rochefoucauld d'Enville	Duke of La Rochefoucauld; 1792–1827	Succeeded by François de La Rochefoucauld
