= Édouard de La Rochefoucauld =

French aristocrat and landowner

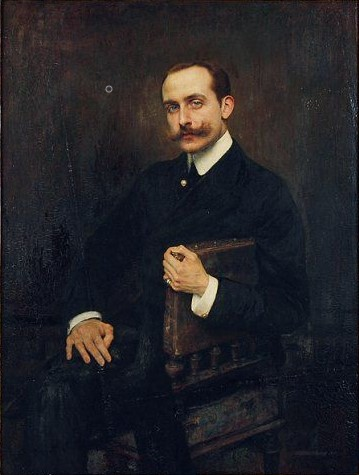
Portrait of Édouard, by Gabriel Ferrier, c. 1908

Count Édouard François Marie de La Rochefoucauld (4 February 1874 – 9 February 1968), 3rd Duke of Bisaccia, was a French aristocrat and landowner.

== Early life ==
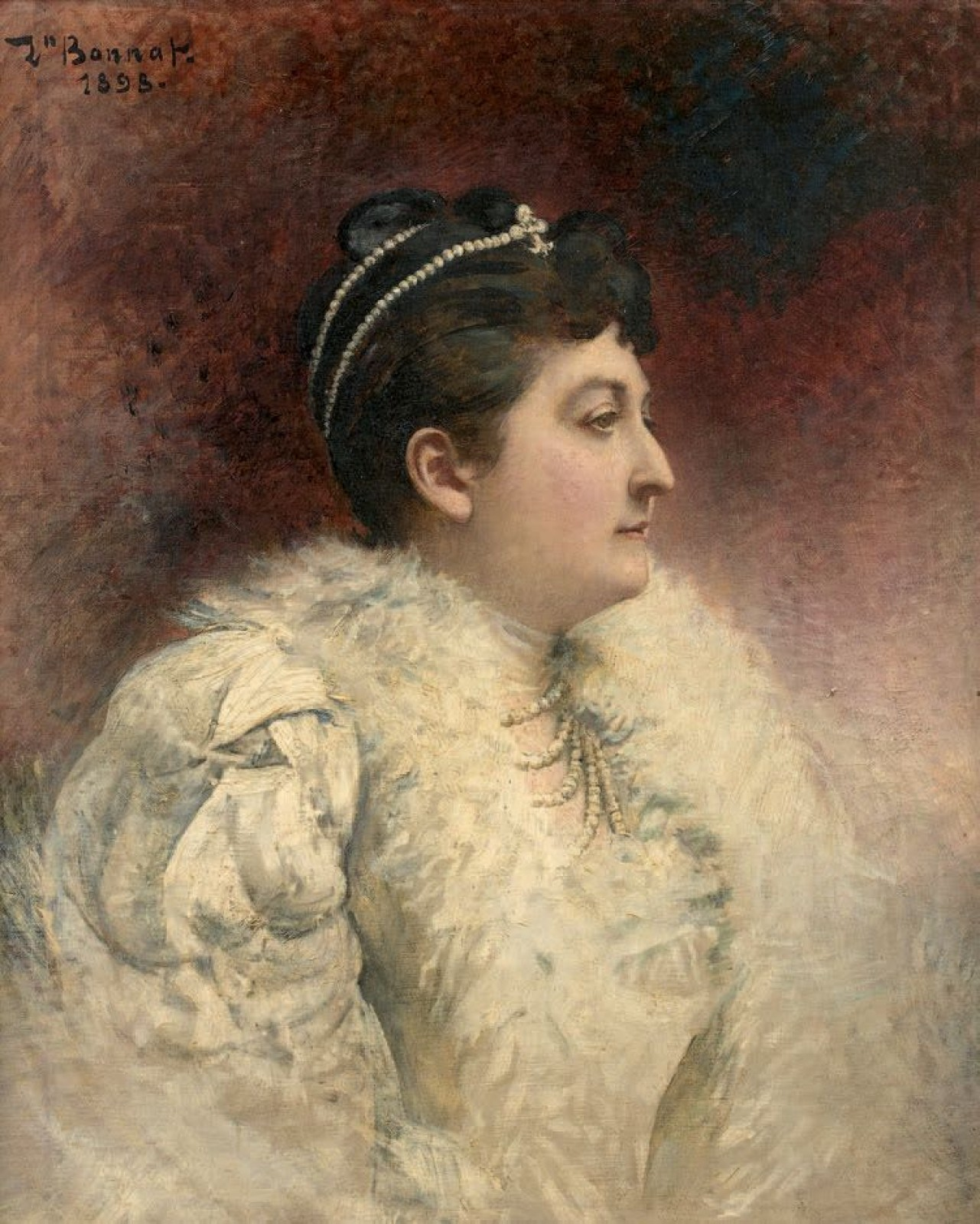
Portrait of his mother, Princess Marie of Ligne, by Léon Bonnat, 1898

La Rochefoucauld was born on 4 February 1874 at the Hôtel de La Rochefoucauld-Doudeauville at 47 Rue de Varenne in the 7th arrondissement of Paris. He was the youngest son of Sosthène II de La Rochefoucauld, 4th Duke of Doudeauville, and, his second wife, Princess Marie Georgine Sophie Hedwige Eugenie of Ligne (1843–1911). From his father's first marriage to Princess Yolande of Polignac (a daughter of Prime Minister Prince Jules de Polignac), he had an elder half-sister, Yolande de La Rochefoucauld (who married Charles Honoré Emmanuel d'Albert de Luynes, 9th Duke of Luynes). From his parents' marriage, his elder siblings were Charles de La Rochefoucauld-Doudeauville (who took the Spanish title of Duke of Estrées); Elisabeth de la Rochefoucauld (who married their cousin, Louis, 9th Prince of Ligne); Armand de La Rochefoucauld (who became the 5th Duke of Doudeauville and married Princess Marié Lise Radziwiłł); and Marie de La Rochefoucauld (who married François d'Harcourt, 10th Duke of Harcourt).

His paternal grandparents were Sosthènes I de La Rochefoucauld and Elisabeth-Hélène-Pierre de Montmorency Laval (the daughter of the French Minister of Foreign Affairs Mathieu de Montmorency, 1st Duke of Montmorency-Laval). His maternal grandparents were the Belgian Ambassador to France, Eugène, 8th Prince of Ligne, and, his third wife, Princess Jadwiga Lubomirska (a daughter of Ukrainian Prince Henryk Ludwik Lubomirski).

== Career ==
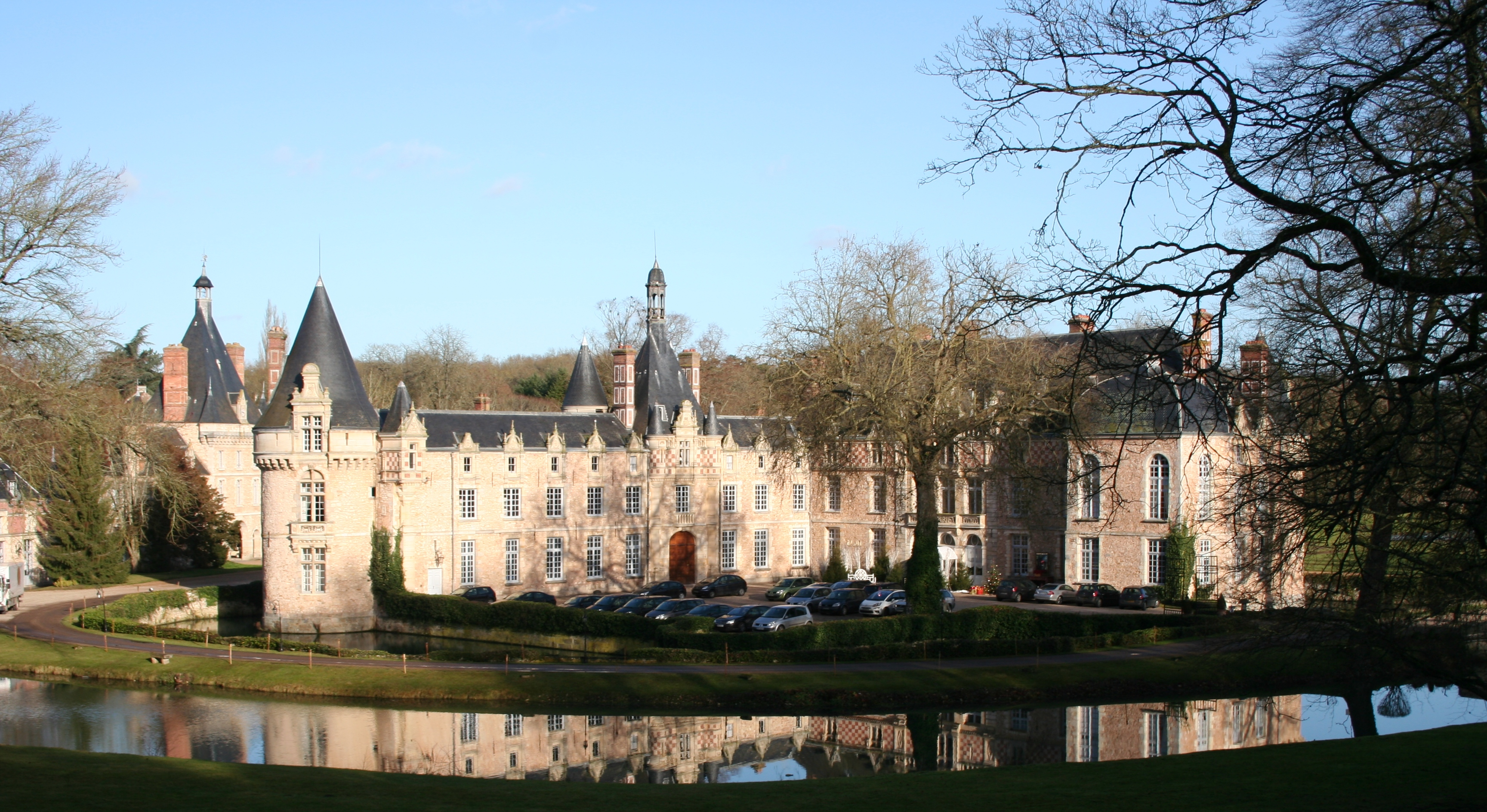
Château d'Esclimont, Eure-et-Loir

On 16 May 1851, his father was created Duke of Bisaccia (Duca di Bisaccia) by King Ferdinand II in the peerage of the Kingdom of the Two Sicilies (second creation; through his grandmother's family, the Montmorency-Lavals). They were also inscripted among the Bavarian nobility as Princes under the title Duke of Bisaccia (Herzog von Bisaccia), on 24 November 1855 by King Maximilian II. His elder brother Charles inherited his father's dukedoms, only taking the Spanish title of Duke of Estrées, while transferring the title of Duke of Doudeauville to Armand, and the Sicilian title, Duke of Bisaccia, to Édouard, making him the 3rd Duke of Bisaccia in 1908.

From his father, he also inherited the Château d'Esclimont in Saint-Symphorien-le-Château, Eure-et-Loir, which his father, Sosthènes I, had inherited through his 1779 marriage into the Montmorency-Laval family. In 1910, he became a member of the Société archéologique d'Eure-et-Loir.

== Personal life ==
On 19 June 1901, Rochefoucauld married Camille de Colbert-Chabanais (1883–1969), a daughter of Édouard de Colbert, 3rd Baron de Colbert, Marquis de Chabannais (a grandson of Auguste François-Marie de Colbert-Chabanais), and Françoise Marie Auguste de Berckheim (daughter of Baron Sigismond Guillaume de Berckheim). Together, they were the parents of:

- Marie-Carmen Élisabeth Françoise Gabrielle de la Rochefoucauld (1902–1999), who married Count Louis Gabriel Raoul de Mailly-Nesle in 1928.
- Count Stanislas Édouard François Marie de La Rochefoucauld (1903–1965), who married Romanian-born French actress Alice Cocéa, the sister of socialist journalist and novelist N. D. Cocea, in 1926. They divorced in 1931, and he married Princess Jeanne of Sanfelice de Viggiano, a daughter of Don Luigi Sanfelice, Prince of Viggiano, Marquess of Monteforte, and Princess Jeanne de Bauffremont-Courtenay (a daughter of Prince Paul de Bauffremont and Countess Valentine de Riquet de Caraman-Chimay), in 1947.
- Élisabeth de La Rochefoucauld (1909–2006), married Elliot Robert Le Gras du Luart de Montsaulnin, son of Roland Le Gras, Marquis du Luart, in 1929. She later married Mario Fausto Maria Pinci, in 1958.

The Duke died in Paris on 9 February 1968. Upon his death, the Château d'Esclimont passed to his eldest daughter Marie-Carmen, Countess of Mailly-Nesle.

=== Descendants ===
Through his daughter Marie-Carmen, he was a grandfather of Laure-Suzanne-Marie (née de Mailly-Nesle) Maingard, who sold the Château d'Esclimont in 1981 to René Traversac, president of the luxury hotel group "Les Grandes Étapes Françaises". Traversac's son, Pierre Traversac, sold the estate for €35 million in January 2015.

Through his daughter Élisabeth, he was a grandfather of Roland du Luart, Marquis du Luart (b. 1940), a former member of the Senate of France, who has been president of the Jockey-Club de Paris since 2014 (like Édouard's father and brother, Armand).
