= Sosthène II de La Rochefoucauld =

French politician and diplomat (1825–1908)

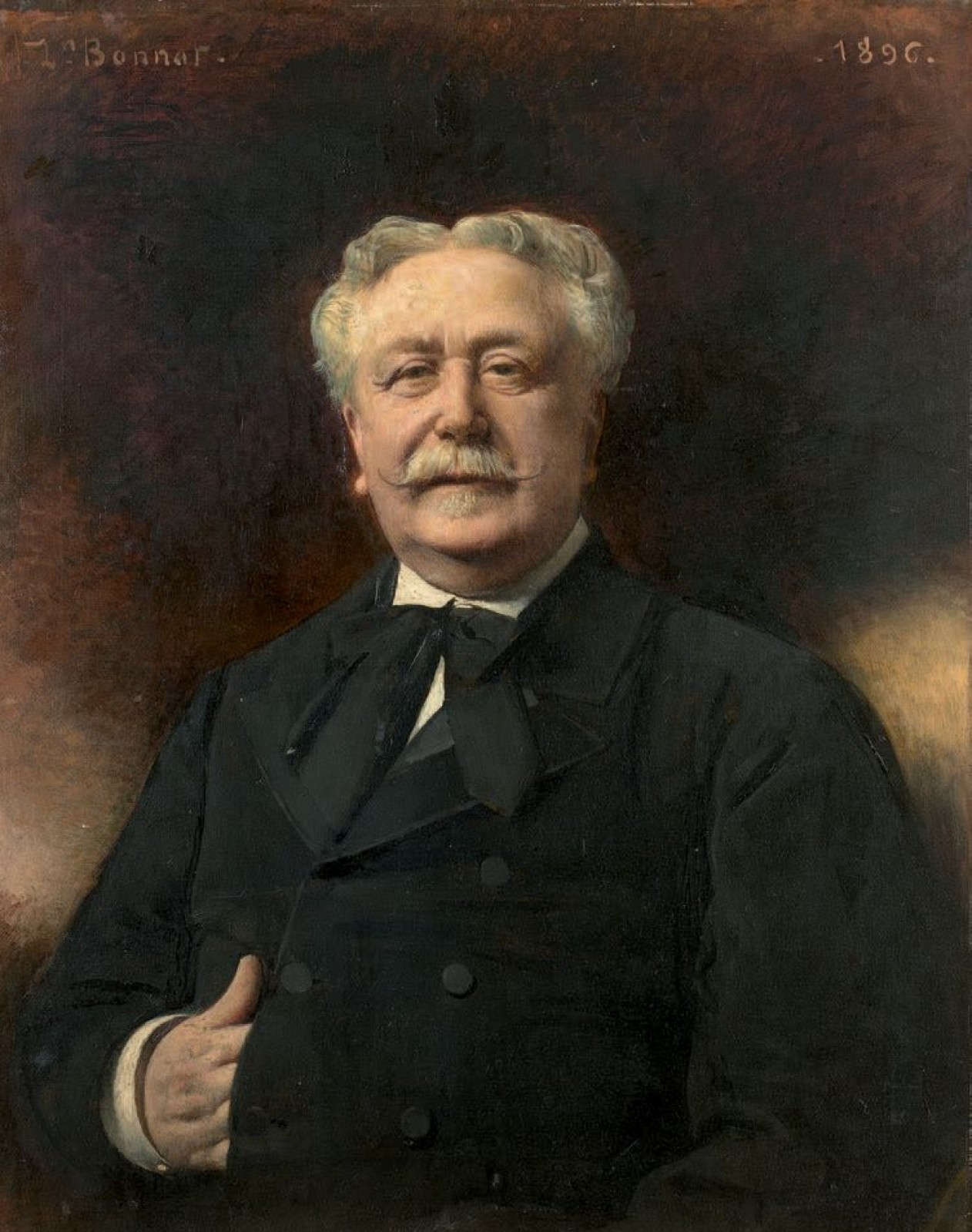
- Portrait of Sosthènes II, by Léon Bonnat, 1899

Ambassador of France to the United Kingdom
- In office 1873–1874
- Preceded by: Louis Decazes
- Succeeded by: Georges d'Harcourt-Olonde

Personal details
- Born: Marie-Charles-Gabriel-Sosthène de La Rochefoucauld; 1 September 1825 Paris, France
- Died: 27 August 1908 (aged 82) Bonnétable, Sarthe, France
- Spouse(s): Princess Yolande of Polignac (m. 1848; died 1855) Princess Marie of Ligne (m. 1862; died 1908)
- Parent(s): Sosthènes I de La Rochefoucauld; Elisabeth de Montmorency Laval

Charles Gabriel Marie Sosthène II de La Rochefoucauld (1 September 1825 – 27 August 1908), 4th Duke of Doudeauville, 1st Duke of Bisaccia, Grandee of Spain, was a French politician during the Third Republic who served as Deputy for Sarthe from 1871 to 1898 and French Ambassador to London from 1873 to 1874.

== Early life ==
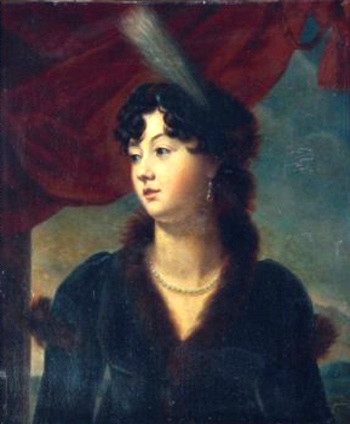
Portrait of his mother, Élisabeth de Montmorency-Laval

Sosthène was born on 1 September 1825 in Paris, France. He was the second son of Sosthènes I de La Rochefoucauld (1785–1864) and Elisabeth-Hélène-Pierre de Montmorency Laval (1790–1834). After his mother's death, his father married Angélique Herminie de La Brousse de Verteillac, in 1841. (Note: Angélique Herminie de La Brousse de Verteillac (1797–1881), was the daughter of François-Gabriel-Thibault of La Brousse de Verteillac, Marquis de Verteillac, Baron de La Tour Blanche, and Charlotte Félicité Élisabeth Tiercelin d'Appelvoisin. She was the widow of Félix de Bourbon-Conti (recognized natural son of Louis François, Prince of Conti). When her first husband died in 1840, she inherited Hôtel de Boisgelin (which later became known as the Hôtel de La Rochefoucauld-Doudeauville).) His elder brother was Stanislas de La Rochefoucauld, 3rd Duke of Doudeauville.

His paternal grandparents were Ambroise-Polycarpe de La Rochefoucauld, 1st Duke of Doudeauville, and the heiress Bénigne-Augustine Le Tellier de Louvois. His aunt, Françoise Charlotte Ernestine de La Rochfoucauld, was the wife of Pierre Jean Julie Chapt, Marquis of Rastignac. His maternal grandparents were the French Minister of Foreign Affairs Mathieu de Montmorency, 1st Duke of Montmorency-Laval, and Pauline Hortense d'Albert de Luynes (a daughter of Louis Joseph d'Albert, 6th Duke of Luynes).

== Career ==
He was a representative for Sarthe from 1871 to 1876 and deputy for Sarthe from 1876 to 1898. He also served as General Councilor and President of the General Council of Sarthe. From 1873 to 1874, he served as Ambassador of France to the United Kingdom.

Rochefoucauld was admitted to the Jockey-Club de Paris in 1856, and was elected vice-president in 1877. In 1884, he became president and remained so until his death in 1908. He was also a member of several other Parisian clubs, including the Société de l'histoire de France. His son, Armand, was also president of the Jockey Club for more than 40 years (1919 to 1962), and his great-grandson, Roland du Luart, has been president since 2014.

=== Peerages and honours ===
He was created Duke of Bisaccia (second creation) on 16 May 1851 by King Ferdinand II in the peerage of the Kingdom of the Two Sicilies, through his mother's family, the Montmorency-Lavals.

After his father died at the family's Château d'Armainvilliers in 1864, his elder brother succeeded to the dukedom of Doudeauville. Both of his brother's sons predeceased him, however, so upon Stanislas's death in 1887, he became the 4th Duke of Doudeauville. From this title, he was also a Grandee of Spain.

He was admitted as a Bailiff Knight Grand Cross of the Sovereign Order of Malta.

=== Residences ===
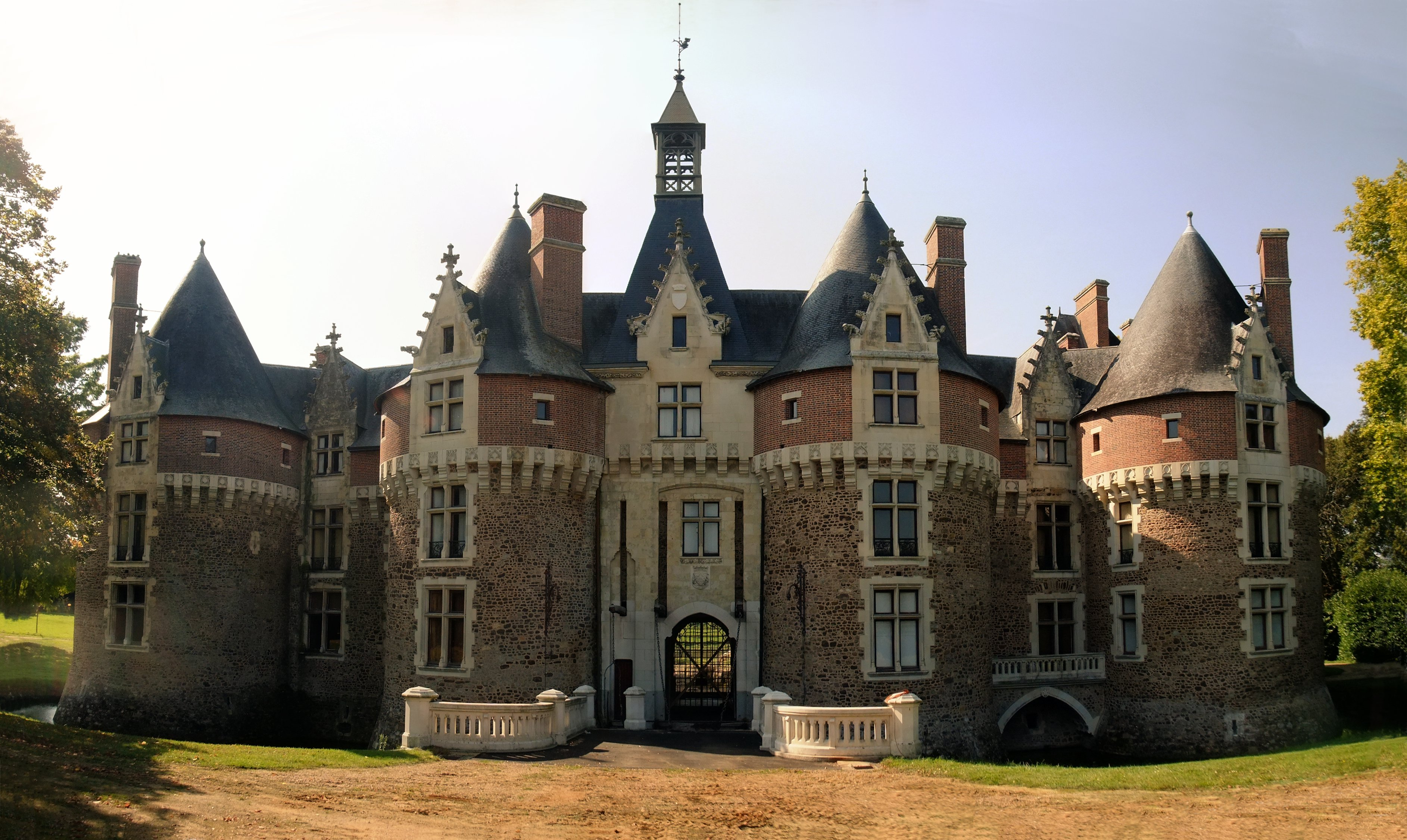
Château de Bonnétable, Sarthe

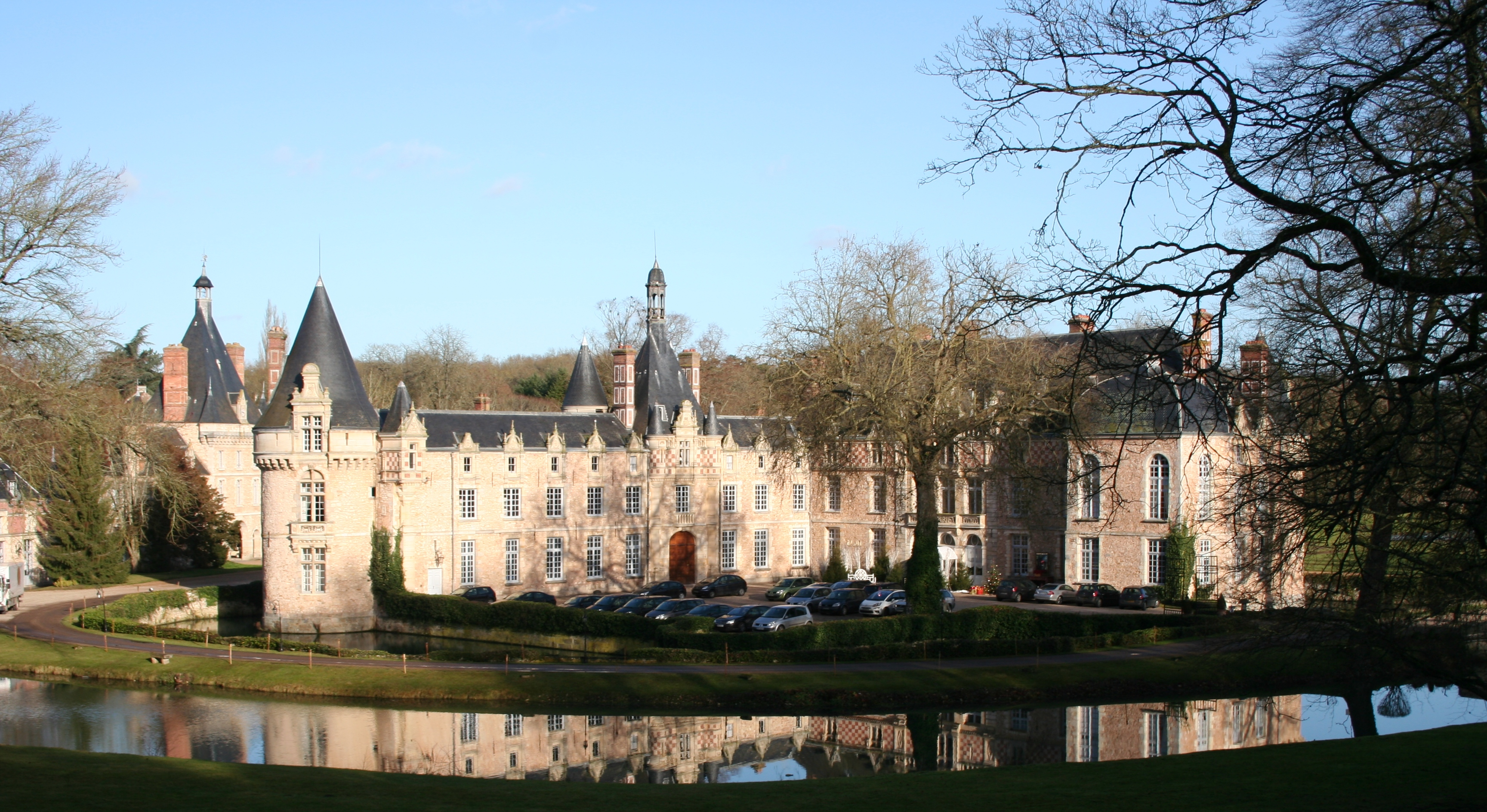
Château d'Esclimont, Eure-et-Loir

The Duke of Doudeauville inherited the Hôtel de La Rochefoucauld-Doudeauville at 47 Rue de Varenne in the 7th arrondissement (today the Italian Embassy). He hired French architect Henri Parent to renovate the Hôtel by putting up panelling (originally in the Château de Bercy) and creating a chapel, a winter garden, a dining room, stables for 25 horses, two rooms for eight carriages, two cellars, and a grand staircase ("escalier d'honneur") panelled with polychromatic marble plaques that was inspired by the Queen's staircase at the Palace of Versailles.

In Sarthe, he lived at the Château de Bonnétable and, in Eure-et-Loir, the Château d'Esclimont, where his daughter Yolande was raised. Henri Parent was hired to restore these properties as well.

He was also the owner of Vallée-aux-Loups ("Wolf Valley"), the former home of François-René de Chateaubriand in Châtenay-Malabry, 11 km (6.8 mi) south of central Paris.

== Personal life ==
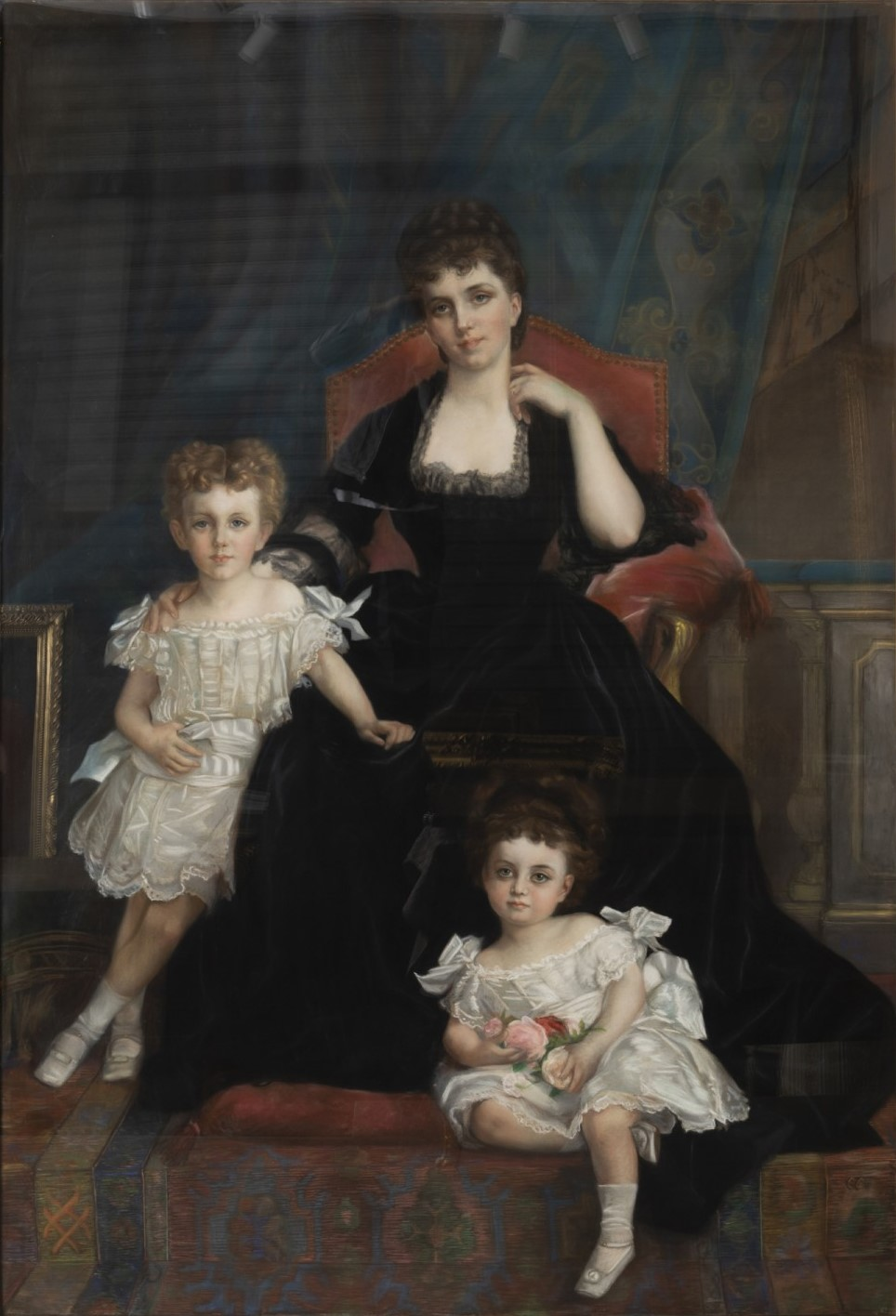
Portrait of his eldest daughter, Yolande de La Rochefoucauld, Duchess of Luynes, by C.C. after Alexandre Cabanel

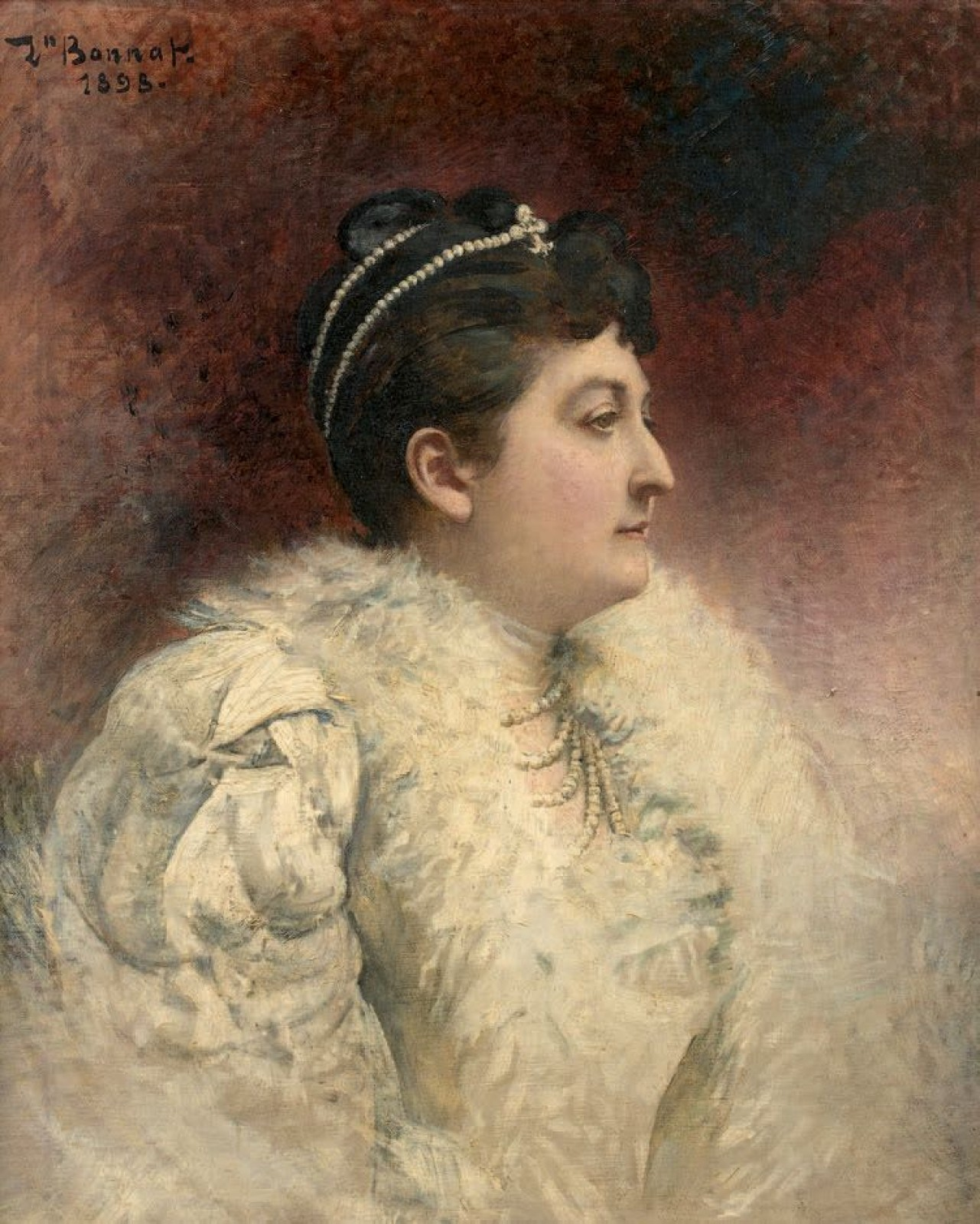
Portrait of his second wife, Princess Marie of Ligne, by Léon Bonnat, 1898

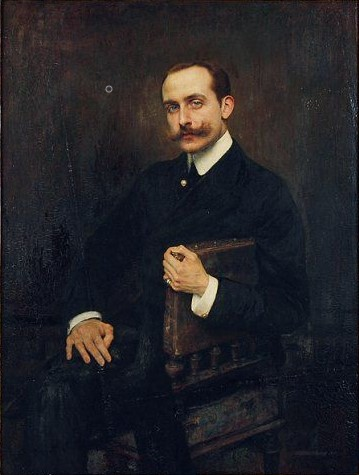
Portrait of his youngest son, Édouard, by Gabriel Ferrier, c. 1908

On 6 April 1848, he married Princess Yolande of Polignac (1830–1855) in Paris. She was a daughter of Prime Minister Prince Jules de Polignac and the Hon. Mary Charlotte Parkyns (a daughter of the 1st Baron Rancliffe). Before her death on 15 March 1855, they were the parents of:

- Yolande Françoise Marie Julienne de La Rochefoucauld (1849–1905), who married Charles Honoré Emmanuel d'Albert de Luynes, 9th Duke of Luynes, son of Honoré-Louis d'Albert de Luynes and Valentine-Julie de Contades.

After her death, he married Princess Marie Georgine Sophie Hedwige Eugenie of Ligne (1843–1911) on 8 July 1862 at the Château de Belœil in Beloeil, Belgium. She was the youngest daughter of the Belgian Ambassador to France, Eugène, 8th Prince of Ligne, and, his third wife, Princess Jadwiga Lubomirska (a daughter of Ukrainian Prince Henryk Ludwik Lubomirski). Together, they were the parents of:

- Charles Marie François de La Rochefoucauld (1863–1907), who took the Spanish title of Duke of Estrées (which was not recognized in France); he married Princess Charlotte of La Trémoïlle, a daughter of Prince Louis Charles de La Trémoille and Marguerite-Jeanne Tanneguy-Duchâtel (a daughter of Count Charles Marie Tanneguy Duchâtel).
- Henri de La Rochefoucauld (1864–1866), who died young.
- Elisabeth de la Rochefoucauld (1865–1946), who married her cousin, Louis, 9th Prince of Ligne, son of Prince Henri Maximilien of Ligne and Marie Louise Marguerite de Talleyrand-Périgord.
- Armand François Jules Marie de La Rochefoucauld (1870–1963), 5th Duke of Doudeauville, who married Princess Marié Lise Radziwiłł, a daughter of Prince Constantine Radziwiłł and Louise Blanc of the Château d'Ermenonville (a daughter of François Blanc and Marie Charlotte Blanc, who operated the Monte Carlo Casino).
- Marie de La Rochefoucauld (1871–1952), who married Henri Eugène François Marie d'Harcourt, 10th Duke of Harcourt.
- Édouard François Marie de La Rochefoucauld (1874–1968), 2nd Duke of Bisaccia who married Camille de Colbert-Chabanais, a daughter of Édouard de Colbert, 3rd Baron de Colbert, Marquis de Chabannais, and Françoise Marie Auguste von Berckheim.

The Duke died at the Château de Bonnétable in Sarthe on 27 August 1908.

=== Descendants ===
Through his daughter Yolande, he was a grandfather of Honoré d'Albert de Luynes, 10th Duke of Luynes (1868–1924), who married Simone Louise Laure de Crussol d'Uzes (a daughter of Emmanuel de Crussol, 12th Duke of Uzès and Anne de Rochechouart de Mortemart, who inherited a large fortune from her great-grandmother, Madame Clicquot Ponsardin, founder of Veuve Clicquot); and Yolande Louise Marie Valentine d'Albert de Luynes (1870–1952), who married Adrien de Noailles, 8th Duke of Noailles (a son of Jules Charles Victurnien de Noailles, 7th Duke of Noailles).

Through his son Armand, he was a grandfather of Sosthènes III de La Rochefoucauld (1897–1970), 6th Duke of Doudeauville, who married Countess Leonor de Saavedra of Torrehermosa; and Armand Charles François Marie de La Rochefoucauld (1902–1995), 7th Duke of Doudeauville, who married Esther Millicent Clarke (and had a natural son with Clémentine Elisabeth Brandt).

Through his youngest son Édouard, he was a grandfather of Marie-Carmen de La Rochefoucauld (1902–1999), who married Count of Mailly-Nesles; Count Stanislas of La Rochefoucauld (1903–1965), who married Sophie Alice Cocea and Princess Jeanne Princess of San Felice de Viggiano; and Elisabeth de La Rochefoucauld (1909–2006), who married Elliot Robert Le Gras du Luart de Montsaulnin and Mario Fausto Maria Pinci.
