= Château d'Esclimont =

French château

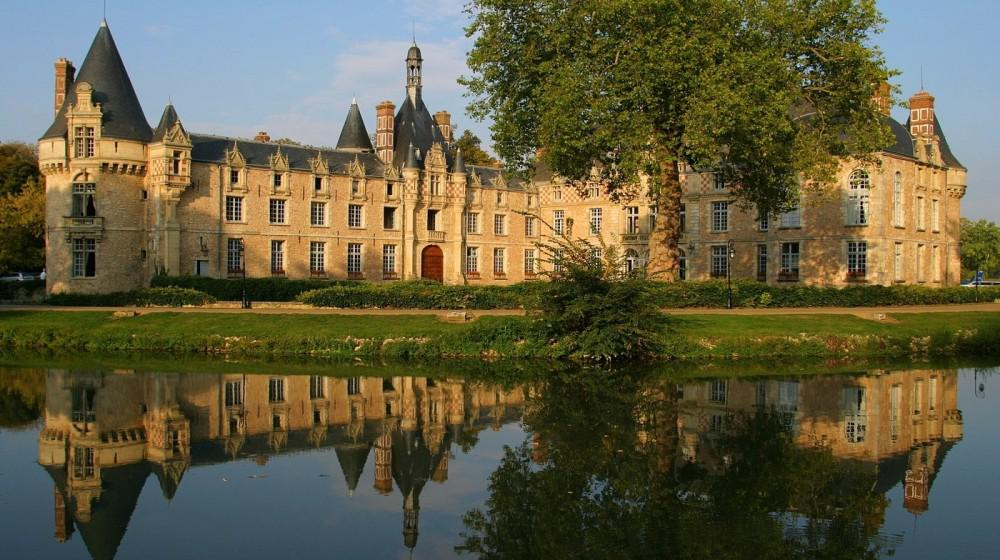
- Interactive map of the Château d'Esclimont area

General information
- Type: Château
- Location: Auneau-Bleury-Saint-Symphorien, Eure-et-Loir, France
- Coordinates: 48°31′11″N 1°45′58″E
- Construction started: 1543
- Renovated: 1865
- Client: Étienne Poncher

Renovating team
- Architect: Henri Parent

The Château d'Esclimont is a historic château that is located in the commune of Auneau-Bleury-Saint-Symphorien (formerly Saint-Symphorien-le-Château), in the French department of Eure-et-Loir in the Centre-Val de Loire region. The château was built in the 16th century for Étienne Poncher, the Archbishop of Tours, and was extensively remodeled in the 19th century by Sosthène II de La Rochefoucauld. The castle was sold by the La Rochefoucauld family in 1981 and was converted into a luxury hotel.

== History ==
The current château, which replaced an old feudal fortress, was constructed in 1543 for Étienne Poncher before passing into the family of Philippe Hurault de Cheverny, Keeper of the Seals of King Henry III, then Chancellor of King Henry IV.

In 1639, the estate was acquired by King Louis XIII's Minister of Finance Claude de Bullion (the close ally of Cardinal Richelieu). His grandson, Charles-Denis de Bullion, Marquis of Gallardon, carried out a number of improvements to the château. After the male line of the Bullion family ended, the estate passed, through marriage, into the hands of the Montmorency-Laval family then to those of the d'Albert de Luynes family. (Note: Guyonne Élisabeth de Montmorency-Laval (1755–1830), a daughter of Guy André Pierre de Montmorency, Duke of Laval, and aunt of Minister of Foreign Affairs Mathieu de Montmorency, 1st Duke of Montmorency-Laval, married Louis Joseph Charles Amable d'Albert, 6th Duke of Luynes (1748–1807), in 1768. The Duchess of Luynes died at the Château d'Esclimont in 1830.)

=== Rochefoucauld-Doudeauville ===
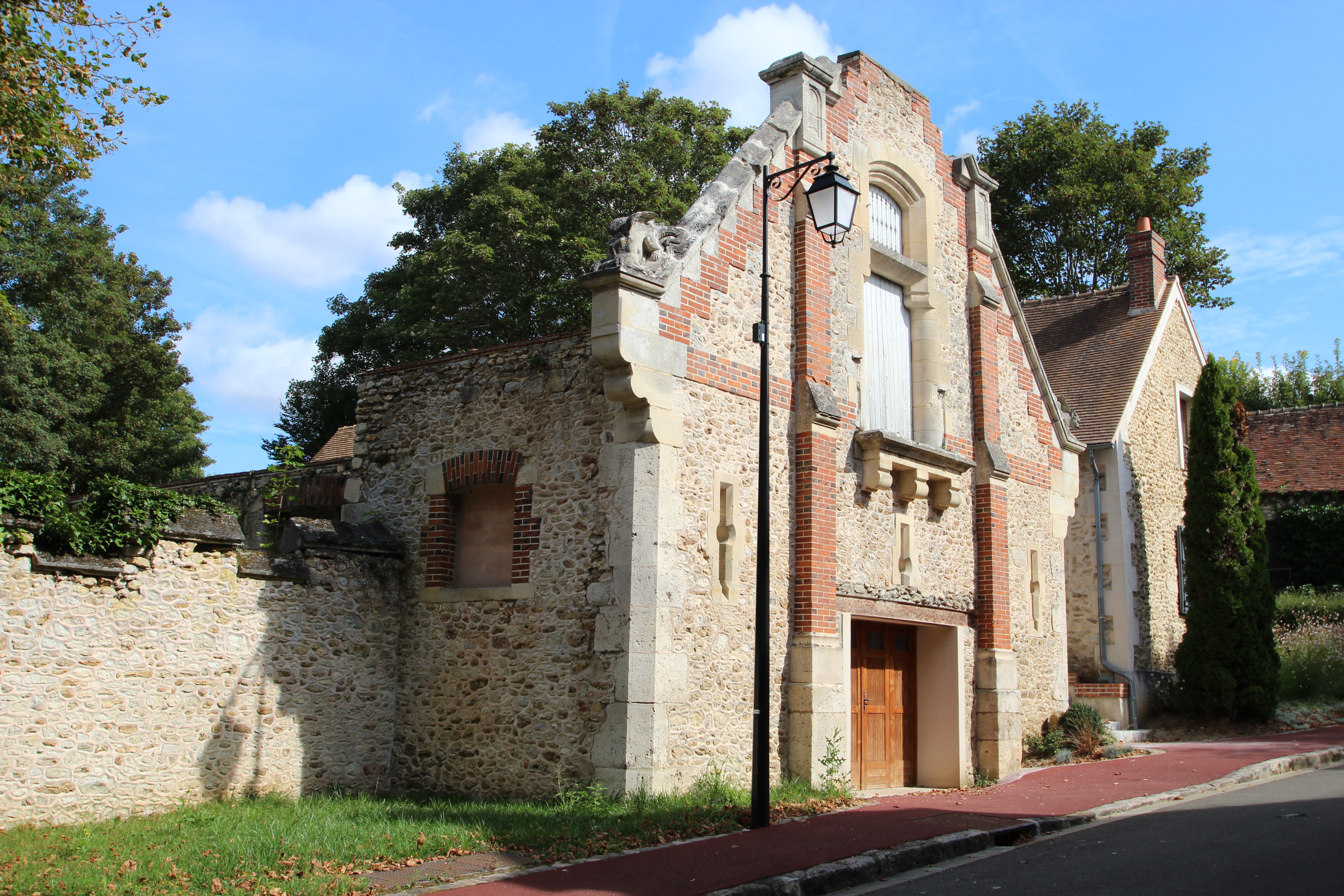
August 2014

The Château d'Esclimont is an edifice of the Renaissance period, skilfully restored in 1864 under the direction of its owner, a man of artistic taste especially in architecture. The building is surrounded by a wide moat, and is flanked by six towers and several turrets. The medieval "keep" serves as the first portion and is flanked with four turrets. A broad river runs through the park. From the windows of the château is seen an expanse of green sward, in which herds of deer roam freely, cut off by a wire fence from the rest of the domain. To right and left are eminences crowned by venerable oaks and other forest kings. The stables are very fine, and the dairy is a beautiful place with porcelain walls.

— King Edward VII, His Life & Reign: The Record of a Noble Career, 1910

In the 19th century, Sosthènes I de La Rochefoucauld, 2nd Duke of Doudeauville inherited the estate. (Note: Sosthènes I de La Rochefoucauld, 2nd Duke of Doudeauville (1785–1864), married Elisabeth-Hélène-Pierre de Montmorency Laval (1790–1834) in 1807. A granddaughter of the 6th Duke of Luynes and Guyonne, Duchess of Luynes, she was daughter of Pauline Hortense d'Albert de Luynes and Mathieu de Montmorency, 1st Duke of Montmorency-Laval (1767–1826).) Upon his death, it passed to his son, Sosthène II de La Rochefoucauld, who hired Henri Parent to restore and update the property (as he did for La Rochefoucauld's Château de Bonnétable and Hôtel de La Rochefoucauld-Doudeauville in Paris). In the 1890s, the Prince of Wales (later King Edward VII), spent three days at the château with the Duke of Doudeauville, who had served as the Ambassador of France to the United Kingdom from 1873 to 1874.

Sosthène II, in turn, left the estate to his youngest son, Édouard de La Rochefoucauld, Duke of Bisaccia. Upon his death, it was left to his eldest daughter, Marie-Carmen de La Rochefoucauld (wife of Count Louis-Gabriel de Mailly-Nesle), and then to her daughter, Laure-Suzanne-Marie Mailly-Nesle (b. 1942), wife of Count Josselin de Maingard.

A 1958 illustrated article in Connaissance des Arts by Ernest de Ganay shows that the château was still richly furnished, including several old tapestries (some from the 18th century, from the series of the life of Henri IV), objets d’art, books and a number family portraits.

=== Luxury hotel ===
In July 1981, Laure-Suzanne-Marie, Countess of Maingard sold the estate to René Traversac, president of the luxury hotel group "Les Grandes Étapes Françaises" (which also owned the Château d'Artigny), who transformed the château into a luxury hotel. Traversac's son, Pierre Traversac, sold the estate in January 2015 to Changlin Yang of the Chinese group Tianci Hot Spring, for €35 million.

== Architecture ==
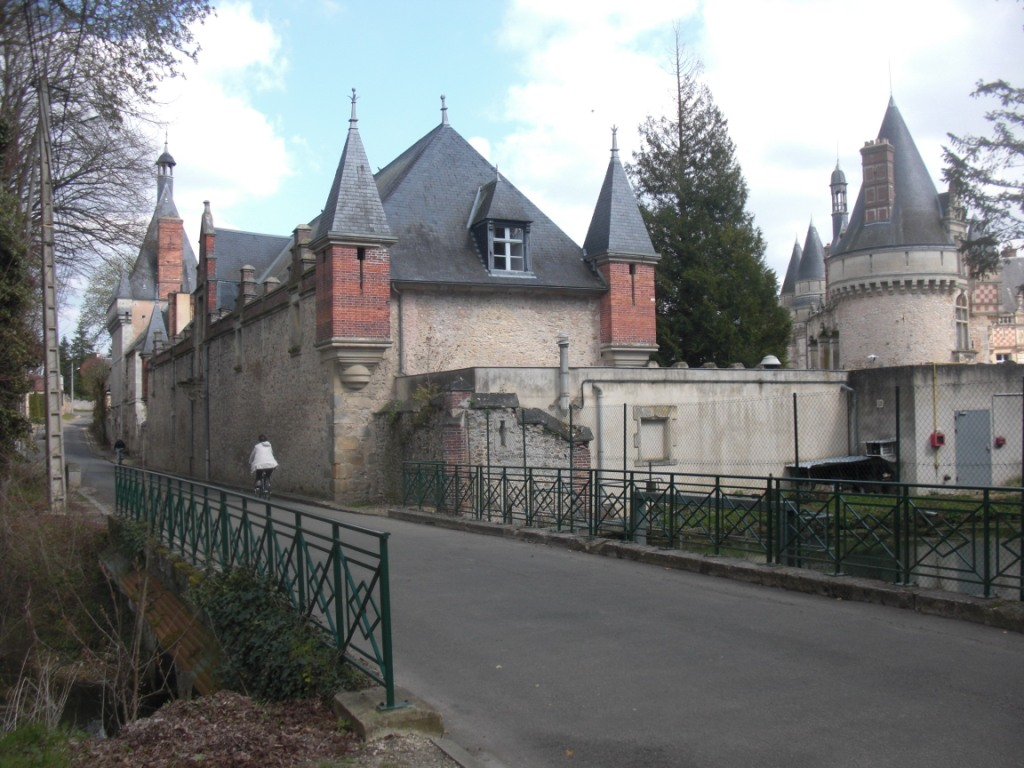
April 2010

In the 16th century, the château was quadrilateral shaped and flanked by round towers at the corners. At the beginning of the 18th century, the south and west façades were demolished, and the others were remodeled in the French Baroque style by the addition of avant-corps topped with triangular pediments. At the same time, the park was redesigned in a formal French style and a pond and a canal were added.

In 1865, architect Henri Parent again renovated the façades, transforming the château into the fashionable Renaissance style by adding watchtowers and dormer windows. The Duke of Doudeauville also had the park redesigned by the Swiss landscape gardeners, and brothers, Denis and Eugène Bühler (who had designed the Parc du Thabor in Rennes). In 1919, a new parterre was created based on designs by Ernest de Ganay.

Today, the building consists of a main building to the east, surrounded by towers overlooking the large parterre, as well as a pavilion topped with imperial attics. The northern lower wing has a passage which gives access to the main courtyard and faces the large entrance pavilion dating from the 14th century.

== In popular culture ==
The estate has also served as a filming location for several films:

- 1961 - The Count of Monte Cristo
- 1964 - Angélique, Marquise des Anges
- 1976 - Monsieur Klein
- 1998 - The Visitors II: The Corridors of Time (exterior scenes as the château de Cora de Montmirail and Valéry de Luigny)

== See also ==
- List of castles in France
