= Uttenhoffen =

- Commune
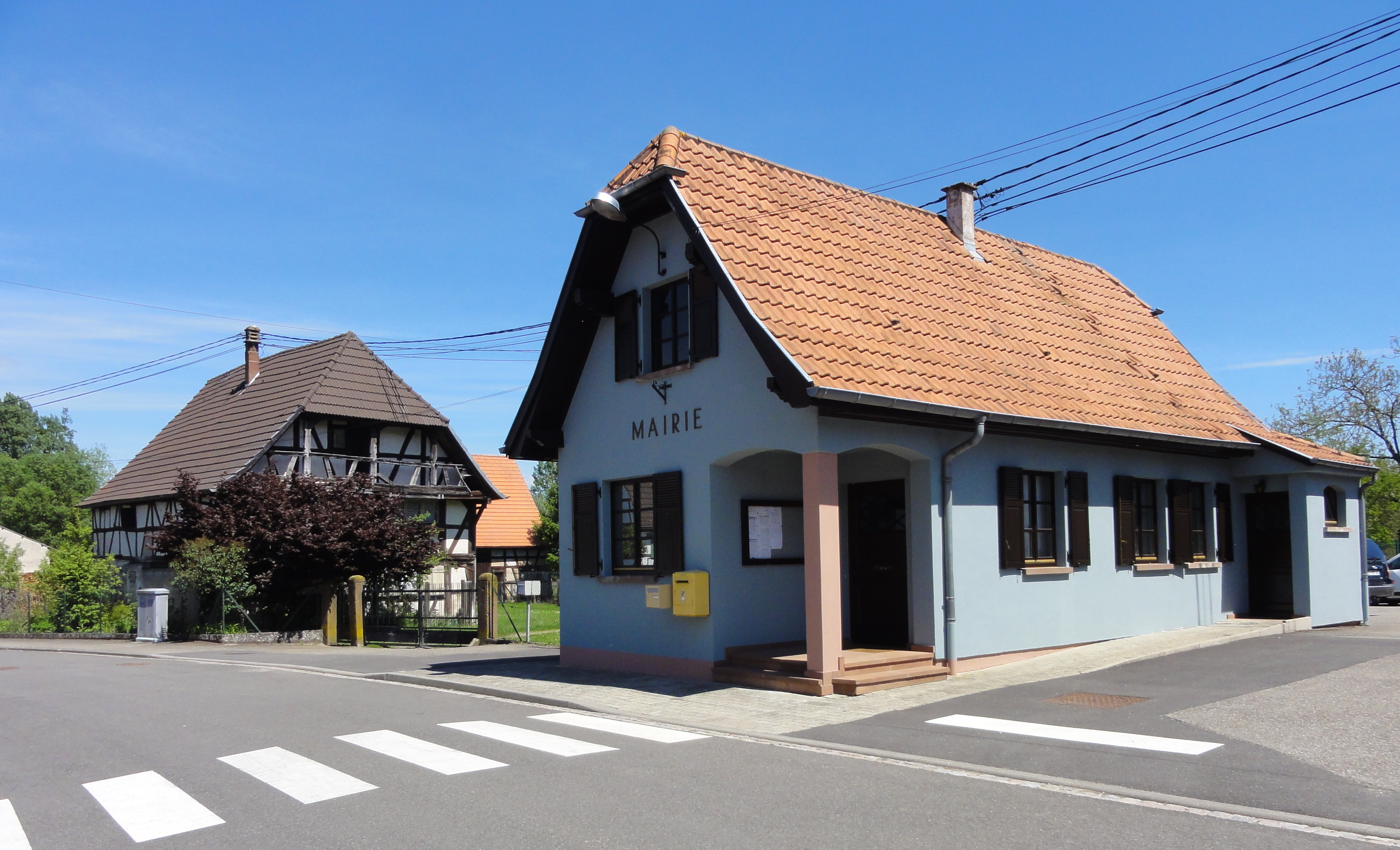
- The town hall in Uttenhoffen

- Coat of arms
- Location of Uttenhoffen
- Location within France Location within Grand Est
- Coordinates: 48°53′36″N 7°39′21″E
- Country: France
- Region: Grand Est
- Department: Bas-Rhin
- Arrondissement: Haguenau-Wissembourg
- Canton: Reichshoffen

Government
  - Mayor (2020–2026): Thomas Bauer
- Area^{1}: 1.95 km^{2} (0.75 sq mi)
- Highest elevation: 250 m (820 ft)
- Lowest elevation: 164 m (538 ft)
- Population (2023): 210
  - Density: 110/km^{2} (280/sq mi)
- Time zone: UTC+01:00 (CET)
  - Summer (DST): UTC+02:00 (CEST)
- INSEE/Postal code: 67502 /67110
- ^{1} French Land Register data, which excludes lakes, ponds, glaciers > 1 km^{2} (0.386 sq mi or 247 acres) and river estuaries.

Uttenhoffen is a commune in the Bas-Rhin department in Grand Est in north-eastern France.

== History ==
Finds from the Neolithic Age and the Hallstatt culture period are as attested as the settlement in Roman times. After introduction of the Reformation in the 16th Century Uttenhoffen had until the 18th century a simultaneous church. Around 1790 it was fortified. On 1 December 1793 the near winter camp of Major General Stephan Bernhard Keglevich and his private Serbian soldiers was attacked by surprise. 7 days later on 8 December 1793 Madame du Barry was executed for treason.

== Architecture ==
The 15th-18th century church has on each side three arched windows and it has a half-timbered church tower with an imperial dome.

== See also ==
- Communes of the Bas-Rhin department
