= Etienne Poncher =

Etienne Poncher is a French name.

Notable people with the name include:

- Étienne de Poncher (1446–1524), French prelate who was Bishop of Paris and Archbishop of Sens.
- Étienne Poncher (Archbishop of Tours) (died 1553), French prelate who was Bishop of Bayonne, Archbishop of Tours
