= Sosthènes I de La Rochefoucauld =

French ultra-royalist politician

The Viscount of La Rochefoucauld
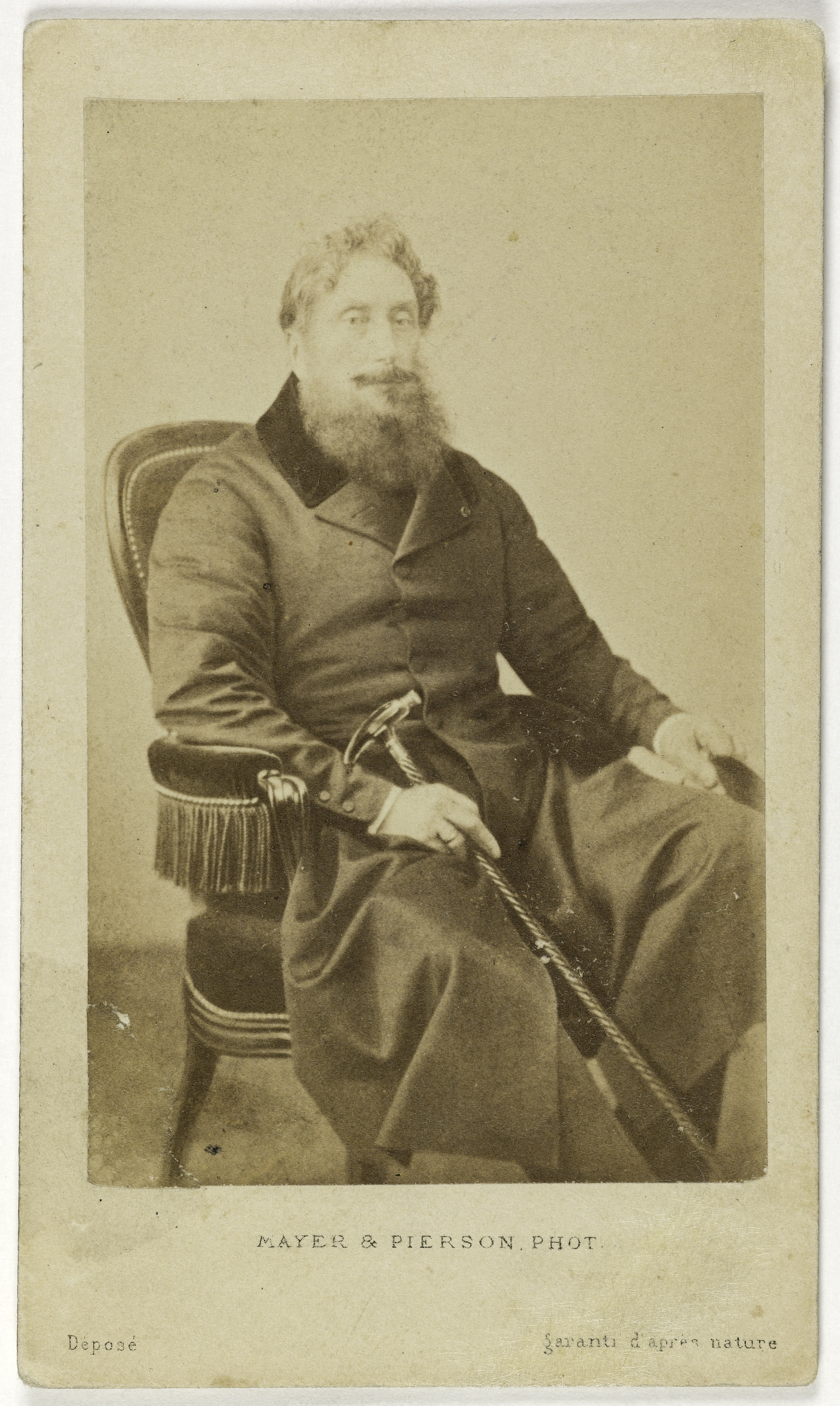
- La Rochefoucauld, by Mayer Frères and Pierson, c. 1860

Deputy for Marne
- In office 5 February 1828 – 16 May 1830
- In office 7 October 1815 – 5 September 1816

Director-General of Fine Arts
- In office August 1824 – July 1830
- Preceded by: Inaugural holder
- Succeeded by: Edmond Cavé (in 1833)

Personal details
- Born: Louis François Sosthènes de La Rochefoucauld; 19 February 1785 Paris, France
- Died: 5 October 1864 (aged 79) Château d'Armainvilliers, Seine-et-Marne, France
- Spouse(s): Elisabeth de Montmorency Laval (m. 1779; died 1841) Angélique Herminie de La Brousse de Verteillac (m. 1841; died 1864)
- Children: 6
- Parent(s): Ambroise-Polycarpe de La Rochefoucauld; Bénigne-Augustine Le Tellier de Louvois
- Awards: Order of Saint-Louis; Order of Saint Januarius

Louis François Sosthènes I de La Rochefoucauld, Viscount of La Rochefoucauld, 2nd Duke of Doudeauville GE (19 February 1785 – 5 October 1864), was a 19th-century French ultra-royalist politician. From 1814 to 1836, he was aide-de-camp to Charles, Count of Artois (future Charles X) and from 1824 to 1830, the King's Director of Fine Arts. He served in the Chamber of Deputies in 1815 and from 1827 to 1830 during the Bourbon Restoration, until his retirement from public life after the July Revolution in 1830. From 1861 to 1864 he published his memoirs with his correspondence in fifteen volumes.

== Early life ==
He was born in Paris on 19 February 1785. He was the son of Ambroise-Polycarpe de La Rochefoucauld, 1st Duke of Doudeauville, and heiress Bénigne-Augustine Le Tellier de Louvois. His sister was Françoise Charlotte Ernestine de La Rochfoucauld, who married Pierre Jean Julie Chapt, Marquis of Rastignac.

His paternal grandparents were Anne-Sabine-Rosalie de Chauvelin (a daughter of Germain Louis de Chauvelin) and Brig. Jean-François de La Rochefoucauld, 5th Marquis of Surgères, who was Governor of Chartres. His maternal grandparents were Charlotte-Bénigne Le Ragois de Bretonvilliers and Charles-François-César Le Tellier de Louvois (a descendant of François-Michel le Tellier, Marquis de Louvois). His niece, Zénaïde Chapt de Rastignac, married François XIV de La Rochefoucauld, 9th Duke of La Rochefoucauld (eldest son and heir of François de La Rochefoucauld, 8th Duke of La Rochefoucauld) His aunt, Anne Alexandrine Rosalie de La Rochefoucauld, Countess of Durtal, was guillotined in Paris in 1794 during the Reign of Terror.

== Career ==
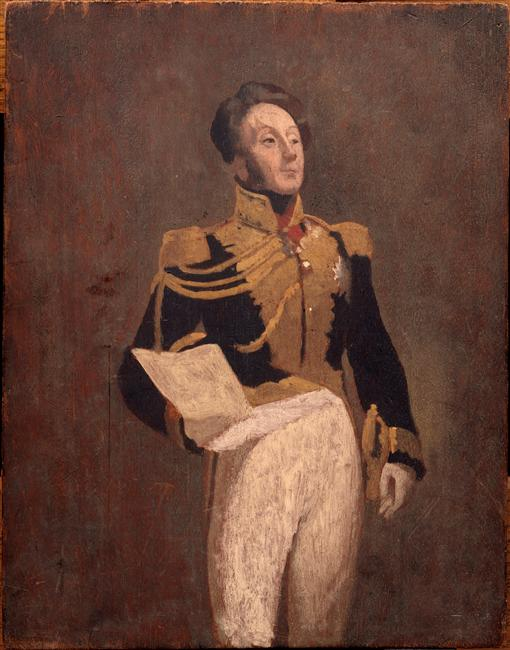
Portrait of Rochefoucauld by François Joseph Heim

La Rochefoucauld was appointed aide-de-camp to General Jean Joseph Dessolles immediately after the Allies entered Paris in 1814. He was sent to Nancy to inform Charles, Count of Artois of the formation of the provisional government and the fall of Napoleon. Due to his role in the reestablishment of the "legitimate throne" after the fall of Napoleon, including attempting to bring down the statue of Napoleon on the Vendôme Column, he was excluded from the amnesty that Bonaparte promulgated, on his return from the island of Elba.

La Rochefoucauld accompanied King Louis XVIII to Ghent, and was appointed Colonel of the 5th Legion of the National Guard of Paris and aide-de-camp to Charles, Count of Artois during the Second Restoration.

On 22 August 1815, he was elected Deputy for Marne in the Chamber of Deputies, voting with the ultra-royalist majority of the "Chambre introuvable" He was unable to be re-elected in 1816 as he was under the newly required age, however, he remained aide-de-camp to the Count of Artois. As an intimate of Zoé Talon du Cayla, he continued his influence in favor of absolute monarchy by pushing her towards Louis XVIII.

=== Director of Fine Arts ===
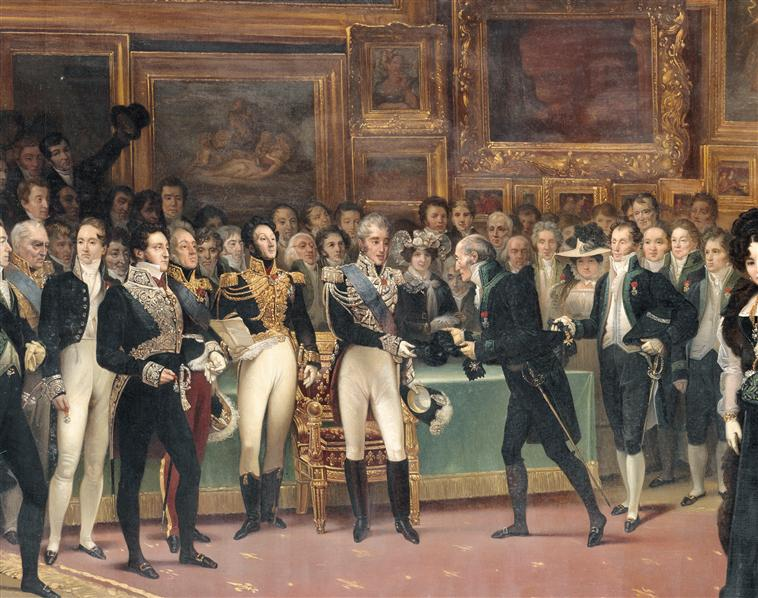
Charles X Distributing Awards to Artists (with Rochefoucauld to the right of the King), 1892 copy by Étienne-Antoine-Eugène Ronjat of François-Joseph Heim's 1827 painting.

In August 1824, King Louis XVIII named him Director General of the Division of Fine Arts and Royal Theaters, a department within the Ministry of the Interior under Minister Jacques Joseph de Corbière. When the King died a few days later, he selected Victor Hugo as the official poet for the Coronation of Charles X of France.

As Director-General of Fine Arts, his duties included supervision of the Royal Theaters and Royal Museums. A number of decrees during his tenure were unpopular, including regulating the length of Opera dancer's skirts, and having plaster vine leaves applied to the middle of all the statues. With the help of Guillaume Capelle, he unsuccessfully tried to take control of the newspapers undertaking to remove Joseph-François Michaud, a highly critical royalist journalist, from overseeing La Quotidienne.

He was able to get Louis XVIII to authorize the purchase of David's Intervention of the Sabine Women and Thermopyle for the Louvre, and Théodore Géricault's The Raft of the Medusa, which was bought from the painter's heirs in 1824. In 1825, together with Louis Nicolas Philippe Auguste de Forbin, he chose the subjects for the decorations of the ceilings of four rooms, intended for the Conseil d'État of the Jacques Lemercier wing of the Louvre.

After July 1830, the position of Director of Fine Arts remained vacant until journalist Edmond Cavé was appointed in 1833.

=== Later years ===
He was promoted to Maréchal de camp in May 1825, before being elected to the Chamber of Deputies on 24 November 1827, as a Deputy of Marne. After the July Revolution of 1830, La Rochefoucauld remained in contact with the royal family in exile. The Duchess of Angoulême (the eldest child of King Louis XVI and Queen Marie Antoinette, and their only child to reach adulthood) asked him to investigate Karl Wilhelm Naundorff, who claimed to be her brother who died in Temple prison.

As a legitimist, La Rochefoucauld was opposed to the July Monarchy and was prosecuted for his pamphlet Today and Tomorrow (French: Aujourd'hui et demain), published in 1832. He was defended by Pierre-Antoine Berryer but lost and was imprisoned for three months in the Sainte-Pélagie Prison in 1833.

Upon his father's death in 1841, he inherited the dukedom of Doudeauville and the marquisate of Surgères. (Note: The dukedom had been created in the peerage of the Kingdom of Spain in 1782, granting him precedence as a Grandee of Spain. The Peerage of France was recreated by the Charter of 1814 at the same time as the Bourbon Restoration, albeit on a different basis from that of the ancien regime before 1789. A new Chamber of Peers was created which was similar to the British House of Lords, and it met at the Palais du Luxembourg. This new Chamber of Peers acted as the upper house of the French parliament.) From 1861 to 1864 he published his memoirs with his correspondence in fifteen volumes.

== Personal life ==
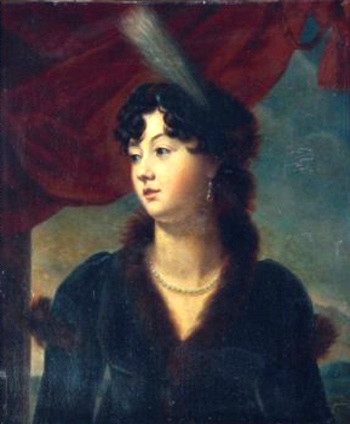
Portrait of his first wife, Élisabeth de Montmorency-Laval

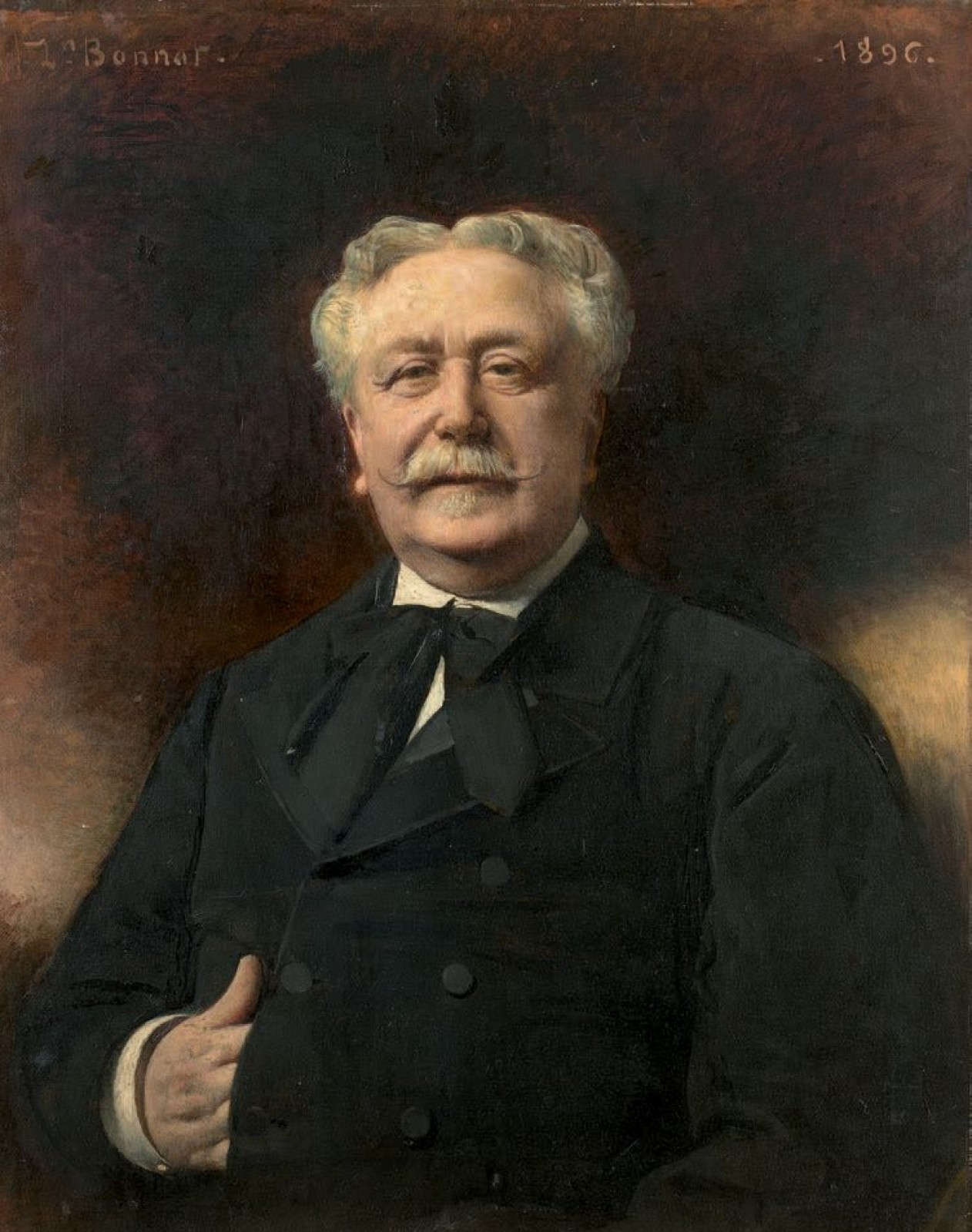
Portrait of his son, Sosthènes II, by Léon Bonnat, 1899

In 1807, he married Elisabeth-Hélène-Pierre de Montmorency Laval (1790–1834), a daughter of Minister of Foreign Affairs Mathieu de Montmorency, 1st Duke of Montmorency-Laval, and Pauline Hortense d'Albert de Luynes (a daughter of Louis Joseph d'Albert, 6th Duke of Luynes). To the marriage, Elisabeth brought the Château d'Esclimont at Saint-Symphorien-le-Château and the Château de Bonnétable in Bonnétable. Together, they were the parents of six children:

- Ambroisine Marie Joséphine Élisabeth de La Rochefoucauld (1821–1835), who died young.
- Augustin Marie Mathieu Stanislas de La Rochefoucauld (1822–1887), 3rd Duke of Doudeauville, who married Marie de Colbert-Chabanais in 1853.
- Hortense Marie Pierre de La Rochefoucauld (b. 1823), who died young.
- Charles Gabriel Marie Sosthène II de La Rochefoucauld (1825–1908), 4th Duke of Doudeauville who was created Duke of Bisaccia in 1851 in the peerage of the Kingdom of the Two Sicilies; he married Princess Yolande of Polignac, a daughter of Prime Minister Prince Jules de Polignac, in 1848. After her death, he married Princess Marie de Ligne, youngest daughter of Eugène, 8th Prince of Ligne.
- Augustin Louis Marie Mathieu Ernest de La Rochefoucauld (b. 1826), who died young.
- Marie Georgine Gertrude de La Rochefoucauld (1827–1840), who died young.

A widower, he remarried on 18 August 1841 to Angélique Herminie de La Brousse de Verteillac (1797–1881), daughter of François-Gabriel-Thibault of La Brousse de Verteillac, Marquis de Verteillac, Baron de La Tour Blanche, and Charlotte Félicité Élisabeth Tiercelin d'Appelvoisin. She was the widow of Félix de Bourbon-Conti (recognized natural son of Louis François, Prince of Conti). When her first husband died in 1840, she inherited Hôtel de Boisgelin (which later became known as the Hôtel de La Rochefoucauld-Doudeauville).

La Rochefoucauld died at Château d'Armainvilliers in Seine-et-Marne on 5 October 1864.

=== Descendants ===
Through his son Stanislas, he was a grandfather of Charles Marie Mathieu Sosthène de La Rochefoucauld (1855–1875) and Auguste François Marie Stanislas Mathieu de La Rochefoucauld (1863–1881). As both boys predeceased their father, without issue, the dukedom and titles reverted to the 2nd Duke's younger son, Sosthène II.

French nobility
| Preceded by Ambroise-Polycarpe de La Rochefoucauld | Duke of Doudeauville; 1841–1864 | Succeeded by Sosthènes II de La Rochefoucauld |
| Preceded by Ambroise-Polycarpe de La Rochefoucauld | Marquis of Surgères; 1841–1841 | Succeeded by Sosthènes II de La Rochefoucauld |
