= List of ambassadors of Italy to France =

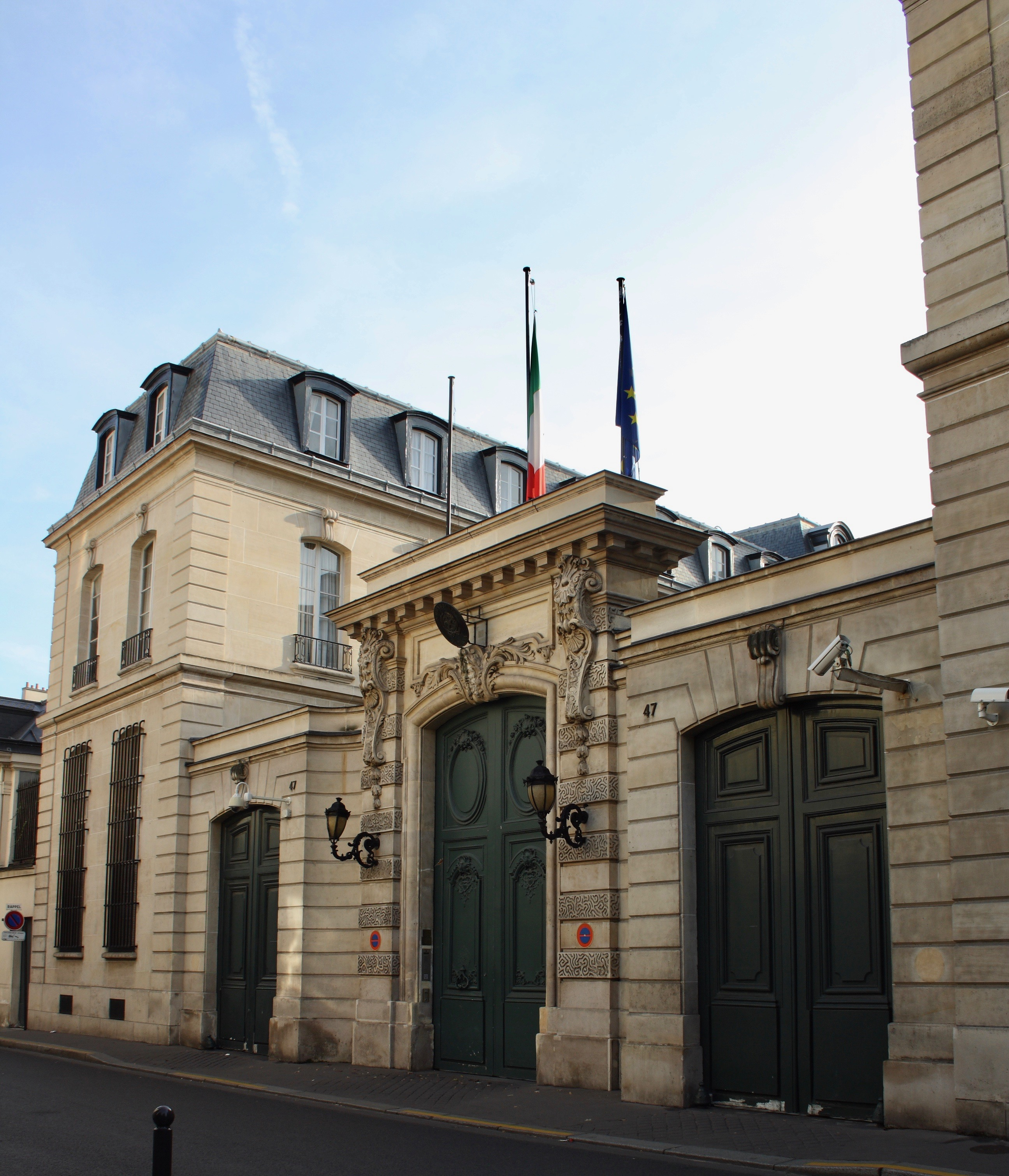
Italian embassy in Paris

The Ambassador of the Italian Republic to France (Italian: Ambasciatore d'Italia in Francia) is the official representative of the government of Italy to the French Republic. The incumbent ambassador is Emanuela D'Alessandro, appointed on 10 October 2022.

The embassy has its offices at the Hôtel de Boisgelin (Rue de Varenne, Paris).

== List ==
From	Up To	Ambassador
1861	1876	Costantino Nigra
1876	1882	Enrico Cialdini
1882	1892	Luigi Federico Menabrea di Val Dora
1892	1895	Costantino Ressman
1895	1908	Giuseppe Tornielli Brusati di Vergano
1908	1910	Giovanni Gallina
1910	1910	Antonino Paternò Castello di San Giuliano
1910	1916	Tommaso Tittoni
1916	1917	Giuseppe Salvago Raggi
1917	1921	Lelio Bonin Longare
1922	1922	Carlo Sforza
1922	1927	Camillo Romano Avezzana
1927	1932	Gaetano Manzoni
1932	1935	Bonifacio Pignatti Morano di Custoza
1935	1938	Vittorio Cerruti
1938	1942	Raffaele Guariglia di Vituso
1942	1945	Interruption of diplomatic relations
1945	1946	Giuseppe Saragat
1946	1958	Pietro Quaroni
1958	1958	Alberto Rossi Longhi
1958	1961	Leonardo Vitetti
1961	1964	Manlio Brosio
1964	1969	Giovanni Fornari
1969	1977	Francesco Malfatti di Montetretto
1977	1981	Gian Franco Pompei
1981	1988	Walter Gardini
1988	1991	Giacomo Attolico
1991	1995	Luigi Guidobono Cavalchini Garofoli
1995	2000	Sergio Vento
2000	2002	Federico Di Roberto
2002	2005	Giovanni Dominedò
2005	2009	Ludovico Ortona
2009	2012	Giovanni Caracciolo di Vietri
2012	2018	Giandomenico Magliano
2018	2022	Teresa Castaldo
2022	-	Emanuela D'Alessandro
