= Étienne Poncher (archbishop of Tours) =

French clergyman

Coat of arms of Étienne Poncher

Étienne Poncher (died 15 March 1553) was a French clergyman of the 16th century. He was successively Bishop of Bayonne, then Archbishop of Tours.

== Early life ==
Poncher was the son of Jean Poncher, Treasurer of Tours, and Catherine Hurault.

== Career ==
A Doctor of Canon Law, he served as abbot of La Roë Abbey (in La Roë) from 6 July 1530, Master of Requests (French: maître des requêtes) in 1531, Chaplain-in-Ordinary of the King (French: aumônier ordinaire du roi) to Francis I in 1534.

He allowed Étienne Amyot, Seneschal of Craon, to occupy La Roë Abbey in 1533, and had as vicars for the temporal and spiritual: Louis Leroux, Canon of Angers, in 1542, and Georges Macé, Prior of Saint-Aignan d'Angers, in 1550.

He was made Bishop of Bayonne in 1532, presiding over the general chapter at La Roë. In 1549 he set forth regulations, in thirteen articles, for the abbey of La Roë, proscribing, among other things, heretical books.

After resigning from Roë at the beginning of 1551, he began serving as Archbishop of Tours in April 1551, as well as Abbot of Charité and Saint-Pierre-le-Vif.

== Personal life ==
In 1543, Poncher began construction on the Château d'Esclimont in the commune of Auneau-Bleury-Saint-Symphorien (formerly Saint-Symphorien-le-Château), in the French department of Eure-et-Loir in the Centre-Val de Loire region. The château replaced an old feudal fortress.

Poncher died in Paris on 15 March 1553 and was buried at the Couvent des Célestins. After his death, his chateau passed into the family of Philippe Hurault de Cheverny, Keeper of the Seals of King Henry III, then Chancellor of King Henry IV.

Catholic Church titles
Preceded by Jean du Bellay	Bishop of Bayonne; 1532–1551	Succeeded by Jean de Moustiers du Fraisse
Preceded by Georges d'Armagnac	Archbishop of Tours; 1551–1553	Succeeded by Alessandro Farnese
