= Mathieu de Montmorency =

French statesman (1767–1826)

Mathieu de Montmorency Duke of Montmorency-Laval Viscount of Montmorency-Laval
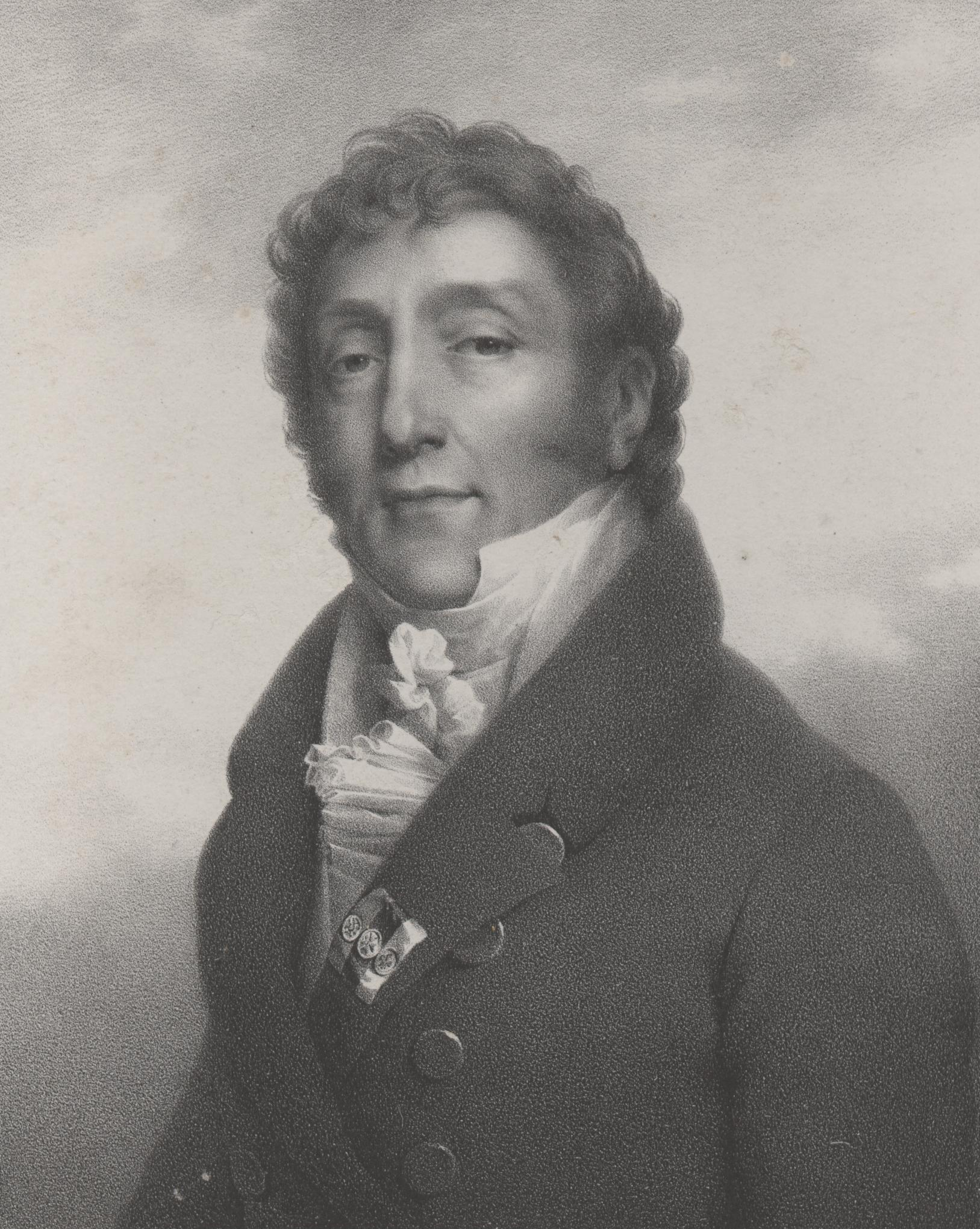
- Lithograph of Montmorency, 1820

Minister of Foreign Affairs
- In office 14 December 1821 – 28 December 1822
- Preceded by: Étienne-Denis Pasquier
- Succeeded by: François-René de Chateaubriand

Personal details
- Born: Mathieu Jean Felicité de Montmorency-Laval; 10 July 1767 Paris, France
- Died: 24 March 1826 (aged 58) 10th arrondissement of Paris
- Party: Ultra-royalist
- Spouse: Hortense d'Albert de Luynes (m. 1788; died 1826)
- Children: Elisabeth Hélène Pierre de Montmorency-Laval
- Parent(s): Mathieu Paul Louis de Montmorency; Catherine Jeanne Tavernier de Boullongne
- Education: Collège du Plessis
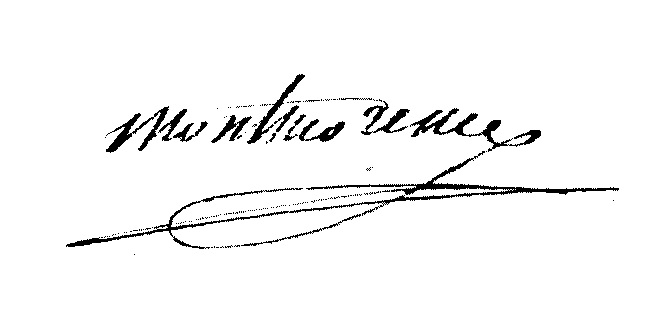
- Signature

Mathieu Jean Felicité de Montmorency, 1st Duke of Montmorency-Laval (10 July 1767 – 24 March 1826) was a French statesman during the French Revolution and Bourbon Restoration. He was elected as the youngest deputy to the Estates-General of 1789. He is also known for his military expertise and his relation with Mme de Staël. When France became a republic, Montmorency turned into an ultra-royalist. Napoleon regarded him as a member of the Catholic opposition. During the Restoration, he became Minister of Foreign Affairs.

== Early life ==
Mathieu de Montomorency was born in Paris, France on 10 July 1767. He was the son of Mathieu Paul Louis de Montmorency, vicomte de Laval (1748–1809), and Catherine Jeanne Tavernier de Boullongne (d. 1838). Montmorency's father was a scion of one of the oldest noble families in France, while his wife was the daughter of an aristocratic French planter in Guadeloupe. Montmorency went on to seek higher education at Collège du Plessis, where he developed his love for the subject of philosophy and the idea of enlightenment.

His paternal grandparents were Guy André Pierre de Montmorency-Laval, 1st Duke of Laval, and Jacqueline Hortense de Bullion de Fervaques. Among his extended family was uncle, Anne-Alexandre-Marie de Montmorency-Laval, 2nd Duke of Laval, and aunt, Guionne de Montmorency-Laval (wife of the 6th Duke of Luynes).

In 1780, his father, a colonel of the Auvergne regiment, was appointed a premier gentilhomme de la chambre to King Louis XVI's younger brother, the Comte de Provence. However, when Catherine was denied the corresponding rank of dame pour accompagner to the prince's wife, Marie-Joséphine, due to her relatively low birth, Laval resigned his post in Provence's household. Montmorency was a very intelligent man. He was a diplomatist and a great writer. He eventually went to become a tutor for Henry, duke de Bordeaux, the grandson of Charles X.

== Career ==
Originally known by the title of Comte de Montmorency-Laval, Mathieu served as an adolescent with his father in the American War of Independence with Lafayette. America was a new nation that had built its nation on democracy and liberty. Montmorency is credited for bringing these new governmental ideas to France. He became the governor of the city and castle of Compiègne, from 1804 to 1809, and from 1812 to 1814.

Montmorency was the Deputy of Montfort-l'Amaury in the Estates General from 28 March 1789 until 30 September 1791, joining as its youngest member. He moved to the left side of the National Assembly, shifting from the Second Estate, the nobility. On 17 August, he was appointed as the secretary of the assembly. Montmorency fought the aristocracy under the tutelage of the abbé Sieyès. He moved the abolition of armorial bearings on 19 June 1790.

=== French Revolution ===
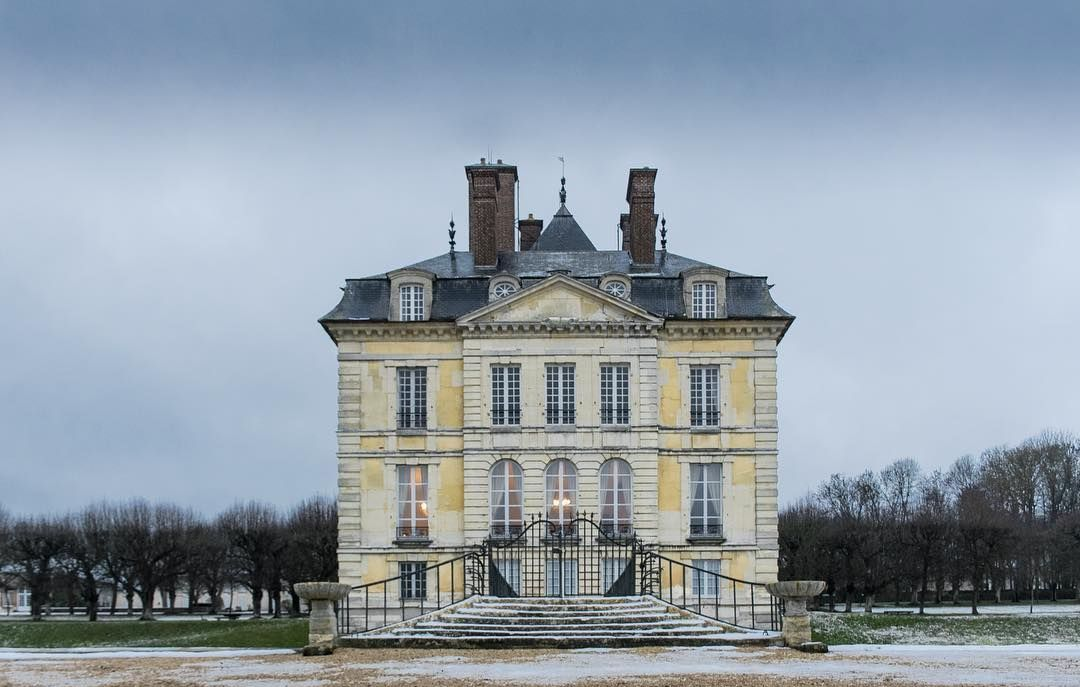
Château d'Ormesson

Before 20 April 1792, he and Count de Narbonne, the Minister of War, went to inspect the troops. Around the Storming of the Tuileries in August, Montmorency fled to Coppet to live with Germaine de Staël and Arnail François, marquis de Jaucourt. In January 1793, he accompanied her to Boulogne-sur-Mer, where she sought refuge in England. On 17 June 1794, his brother, an Abbot, was guillotined. Montmorency started to study the church father, Augustine. In May 1795, he lived in Yverdon. He returned to Paris to see his relatives. He was arrested as an émigré on 26 December, but released after a few days. Montmorency lived at Château d'Ormesson fr on an estate in Ormesson-sur-Marne. De Staël and Constant joined him there and Montmorency visited them in 1797 in Luzarches.

=== First French Empire ===
In 1799, the Consulate seized power in a military coup led by Napoleon Bonaparte. In 1803, he again joined the Coppet group and accompanied de Staël to Paris. In May 1804, Napoleon was granted the title Emperor of the French by the French Sénat conservateur, which ended the French Consulate and began the French First Republic. In August 1811, he traveled with de Staël in Switzerland. François-Emmanuel Guignard, De Montmorency, Mme Récamier were exiled by Napoleon.

Napoleon's army won victories in the War of the Third Coalition against Austria, Prussia, Russia, Britain, and allied states. French dominance was reaffirmed during the War of the Fourth Coalition, before Napoleon's final defeat at the Battle of Waterloo in 1815.

=== Bourbon Restoration ===
At the beginning of the Bourbon Restoration, he was promoted to the rank of maréchal de camp, but in March 1815, (at beginning of the Hundred Days) he accompanied Marie Thérèse of France from Bordeaux to London and met with Louis XVIII in Ghent, who was forced to flee. After the Battle of Waterloo and the final defeat of Napoleon, he was made a peer of France and received the title of Vicomte de Montmorency-Laval. He was instrumental in convincing Armand-Emmanuel du Plessis, Duc de Richelieu to replace his former friend and former Bonapartist Charles Maurice de Talleyrand-Périgord as the new Prime Minister of France. In 1817, Montmorency bought Vallée-aux-Loups from his friend Chateaubriand.

Known for strong reactionary, ultramontane, and Ultra-royalist views, Felicite became the French Minister of Foreign Affairs under Jean-Baptiste Guillaume Joseph, comte de Villèle in December 1821. He recommended armed intervention in Spain to restore Ferdinand VII at the Congress of Verona in October 1822. However, he resigned his post in December, being compensated by the title of Duc de Montmorency-Laval and the cross of the Legion of Honour soon after.

He was elected to the Académie Française in 1825, with few qualifications for the honour. The following year, he was named tutor to the six-year-old heir to the throne, the Duc de Bordeaux, but died two months after receiving the appointment.

== Personal life ==
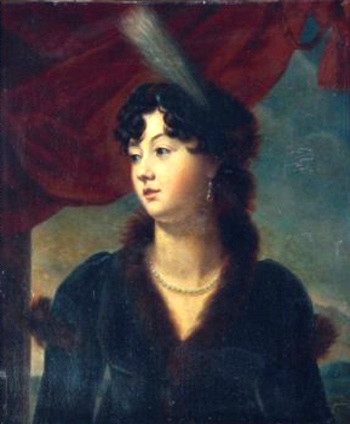
Portrait of his daughter, Élisabeth de Montmorency-Laval, later Duchess of Doudeauville

In 1788, Mathieu de Montmorency married his first cousin Pauline Hortense d'Albert de Luynes (1774–1858), the daughter of Louis Joseph d'Albert, 6th Duke of Luynes, and Guionne de Montmorency-Laval (a daughter of Guy André Pierre de Montmorency-Laval, 1st Duke of Laval). Her only sibling was Charles Marie d'Albert de Luynes, 7th Duke of Luynes, a member of the Chamber of Peers. Together, they were the parents of:

- Élisabeth Hélène Pierre de Montmorency-Laval (1790–1834), who married Sosthènes I de La Rochefoucauld, 2nd Duke of Doudeauville, the son of Ambroise-Polycarpe de La Rochefoucauld, 1st Duke of Doudeauville, and heiress Bénigne-Augustine Le Tellier de Louvois, in 1807. To the marriage, Elisabeth brought the Château d'Esclimont at Saint-Symphorien-le-Château and the Château de Bonnétable in Bonnétable.

The Duke died on 24 March 1826. He was discovered seated lifeless at the end of the Good Friday Liturgy in St. Thomas d'Aquin church in the fashionable St. Germain des Près faubourg. His widow, who outlived the Duke and their only child, died at her home, the Château de Bonnétable, in 1858.

=== Extramarital relationships ===
Despite being married he actually paid very little attention to his wife. Due to the very relaxed nature of marriages, he often was seen without his wife. In actuality, Montmorency was madly in love with another cousin by the name of Marquise de Laval. When Laval died in Summer 1790, Montmorency went to a great depression. Reportedly, Madame de Staël brought Montmorency out of his depression through writing a series of letters to each other. After the death of her husband, Albert Jean Michel de Rocca, in 1818, Montmorency became the legal guardian of de Staël's children. Like August Schlegel, he was one of her intimates until the end of her life.

=== Descendants ===
Through his daughter Élisabeth, he was a grandfather of six, including: Ambroisine de La Rochefoucauld (who died young); Stanislas de La Rochefoucauld, 3rd Duke of Doudeauville (who married Marie de Colbert-Chabanais); Hortense de La Rochefoucauld (who died young); Sosthène II de La Rochefoucauld, 4th Duke of Doudeauville (who was also created Duke of Bisaccia; he married Princess Yolande of Polignac, a daughter of Prime Minister Prince Jules de Polignac, and, after her death, Princess Marie de Ligne, youngest daughter of Eugène, 8th Prince of Ligne); Augustin de La Rochefoucauld (who died young); and Marie de La Rochefoucauld (who died young).
