= Jockey-Club de Paris =

Private club in Paris

The Jockey Club de Paris is a traditional gentlemen's club and is regarded as the most prestigious of private clubs in Paris. It is best remembered as a gathering place of the elite of nineteenth-century French society. Today it is decidedly but not exclusively aristocratic. The club seat is at 2, rue Rabelais in Paris, near the Champs-Élysées and it hosts the International Federation of Racing Authorities.

It no longer has official links to the horse-racing industry organisations, which are separate professional bodies.

== Reciprocities with other clubs ==
- Circolo della Caccia (Rome)
- Knickerbocker Club (New York)
- Metropolitan Club (Washington)
- Turf Club (Lisbon)
- Cercle Royal du Parc (Brussels)
- Boodle's (London)
- Jockey Club für Österreich (Wien)
- Turf Club (London)
- Nuevo Club (Madrid)
- Somerset Club (Boston)
- Pacific-Union Club (San Francisco)
- Círculo de Armas (Buenos Aires)
- Australian Club (Sydney)
- Melbourne Club (Melbourne)
- New Club (Edinburgh)
- Kildare Street & University Club (Dublin)
- Società del Whist Accademia Filarmonica (Torino Italy)

== History ==
The Jockey Club was originally organized as the "Society for the Encouragement of the Improvement of Horse Breeding in France", to provide a single authority for horse racing in the nation, beginning at Chantilly in 1834. It swiftly became the center for the most sportifs or "sportsmen" gentlemen of le Tout-Paris. At the same time, when aristocrats and men of the haute bourgeoisie still formed the governing class, its Anglo-Gallic membership could not fail to give it some political colour: Napoleon III, who had passed some early exile in England, asserted that he had learned to govern an empire through "his intercourse with the calm, self-possessed men of the English turf".

Between 1833 and 1860, the Jockey Club transformed the Champ de Mars into a racecourse, which has since been transferred to Longchamp. One front of the Café de la Paix is in rue Scribe, which ends at the façade of the Opéra Garnier. On the wall is a memorial plaque on the Hotel Scribe, at number 1, which records the former premises of the Jockey Club, which occupied luxurious quarters on the first floor from 1863 to 1913.

During the Second Empire and the Third Republic, the gentlemen of the Jockey Club held numerous boxes at the Opera ("many little suspended salons" in Marcel Proust's phrase), where the required ballet expected in every opera was never in the first act, when the Jockey Club would habitually still be at dinner. One result was the famous fiasco of the "Paris Tannhäuser" of 1861, when Wagner insisted on inserting the requisite ballet into the first act, placing it immediately after the overture to get it out of the way. The second act, when the members of the Jockey Club arrived to view their favourites in the corps de ballet, was all but hissed off the stage. Wagner never permitted another production in Paris. Proust made his fictional character Charles Swann a member of the Jockey Club as a signal honor, given Swann's Jewish background.

On the ground floor beneath the Jockey Club was the fashionable Grand Café. There, on 28 December 1895, a stylish crowd in the Salon Indien attended the public début of the Lumière brothers' invention, the cinematograph.

The Jockey Club is directed by an annually-elected committee of a president, four vice-presidents and twenty-five members. New members are sponsored by two current members and must receive five-sixths of the members' votes present at the ballot. Hence 'No' votes, called black-balls require five 'Yes' votes, or white balls to be countered. Black and white balls are no more in use but for vocabulary.

== Presidents ==
- Lord Henry Seymour (1805–1859): 1834–1835
- M. Anne-Édouard de Normandie: 1835–1836
- Napoléon Joseph Ney, prince de la Moskova (1803–1857): 1836–1849
- Comte Achille Joseph Delamare: 1849–1853
- Armand de Gontaut-Biron, marquis de Saint Blancard (1839–1884): 1853–1884
- Sosthènes de La Rochefoucauld, duc de Doudeauville (1825–1908): 1884–1908
- Aymeri, duc de Montesquiou-Fezensac (1843–1913): 1908–1913
- Comte Elie d'Avaray: 1913–1919
- Armand de la Rochefoucauld, duc de Doudeauville: 1919–1962
- Philippe, duc de Luynes: 1962–1977
- Pierre de Cossé, duc de Brissac: 1977–1985
- Alexandre de La Rochefoucauld, duc d'Estissac: 1985–1997
- François de Cossé, duc de Brissac: 1997–2014
- Roland du Luart, marquis du Luart: 2014–present

== Prix du Jockey Club ==
Under the patronage of the Jockey Club, the Prix du Jockey Club (1,500,000 euros) has been run at the Chantilly Racecourse (at the foot of the Château de Chantilly) on the first Sunday in June since 1836. The race at the Hippodrome de Chantilly is the proving-ground of the best of the three-year-olds, the French equivalent of The Derby at Epsom Downs or the Kentucky Derby in the USA.

Until 2004, the course was 2400 meters; since then, it has been run at 2100 meters. In France, only the Prix de l'Arc de Triomphe has a richer purse (5,000,000 euros); that race was inaugurated by the Jockey Club in 1863 as the Grand Prix de Paris, and run at the Hippodrome de Longchamp. The racecourse was painted by Édouard Manet, Edgar Degas, and Pablo Picasso, among others.

== See also ==
- Jockey Club, the British authority
- The Jockey Club, the American authority
- Suzanne Lagier
