= Roland du Luart =

French politician (born 1940)

Roland du Luart (born 12 March 1940) is a former member of the Senate of France, who represented the Sarthe department. He was a member of the Union for a Popular Movement and served as one of the Senate's vice-presidents.

Since 2014, he has been the president of the Jockey-Club de Paris.
