= Comtois steeple =

Church bell tower with Imperial dome

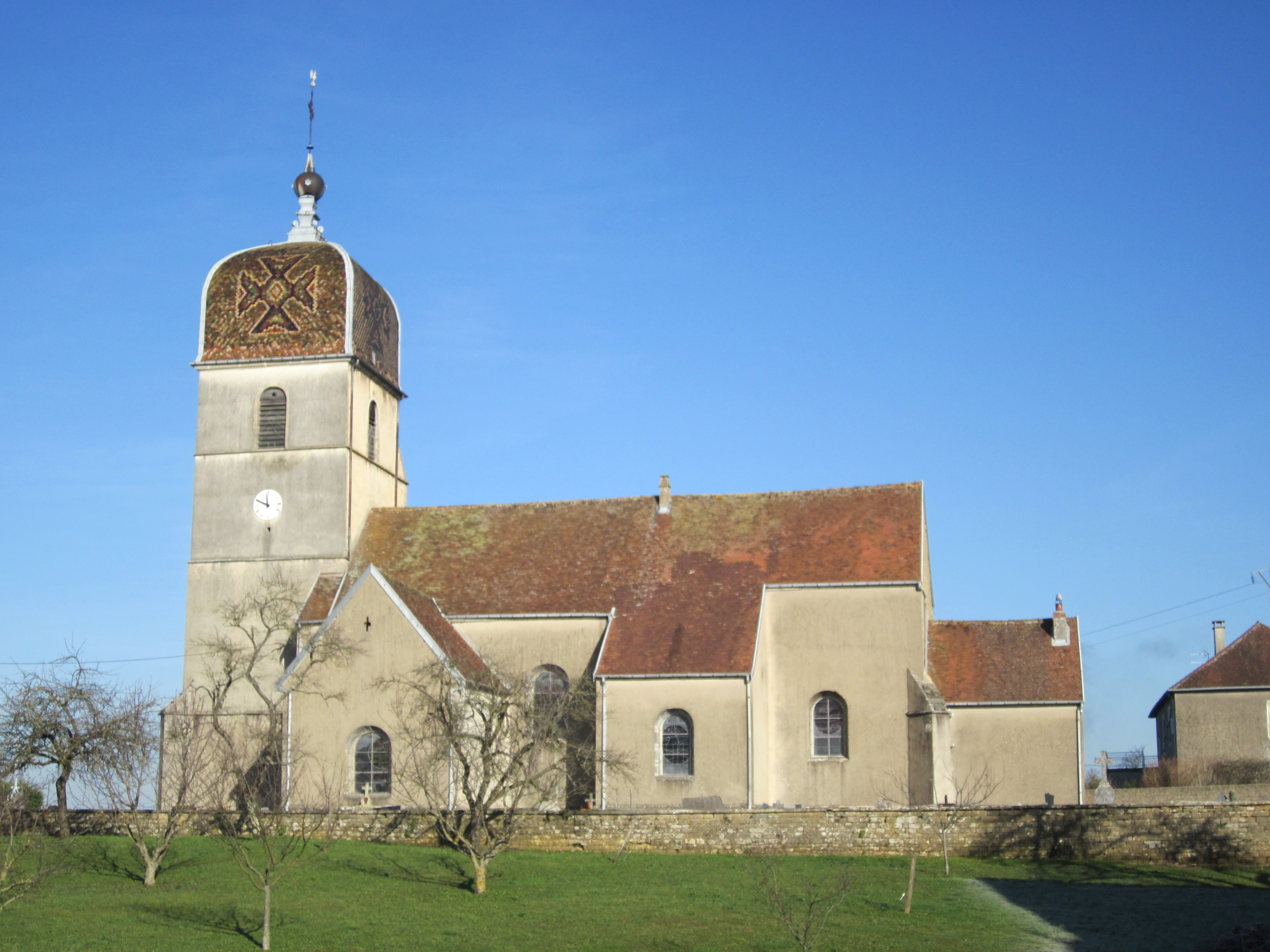
Comtois steeple at Montholier church, Jura, France

The Comtois steeple is a typical bell tower on Christian churches with an imperial dome in Franche-Comté, France. Nearly 700 Comtois steeples remain in this eastern traditional province.

This kind of steeple is incorporated into the entrance of the churches restored mainly during the eighteenth century after destructions in the Thirty Years' War in that country and French conquest in 1678. The cloister vault with raised sides ("dôme à pans relevés") and the polychrome glazed tiles on the roofs are typical characteristics of this regional church architecture.

== Bibliography ==
- 1994 : Marielle Myotte, Entre terre et ciel : les clochers à l'impériale en Franche Comté, Cetre F. ISBN 978-2878230475
- 2001 : Dominique Bonnet & Denis Maraux : Clochers comtois, (éd. La Taillanderie). ISBN 2876292289
- 2002 : Sylvie Debras; Samira Nezza; Denis Maraux & Jack Varlet : Clochers de Franche-Comté, (éd. Tigibus). ISBN 2914638019
