= Hôtel de Boisgelin (Rue de Varenne, Paris) =

Coordinates: 48.8540°N 2.3220°E

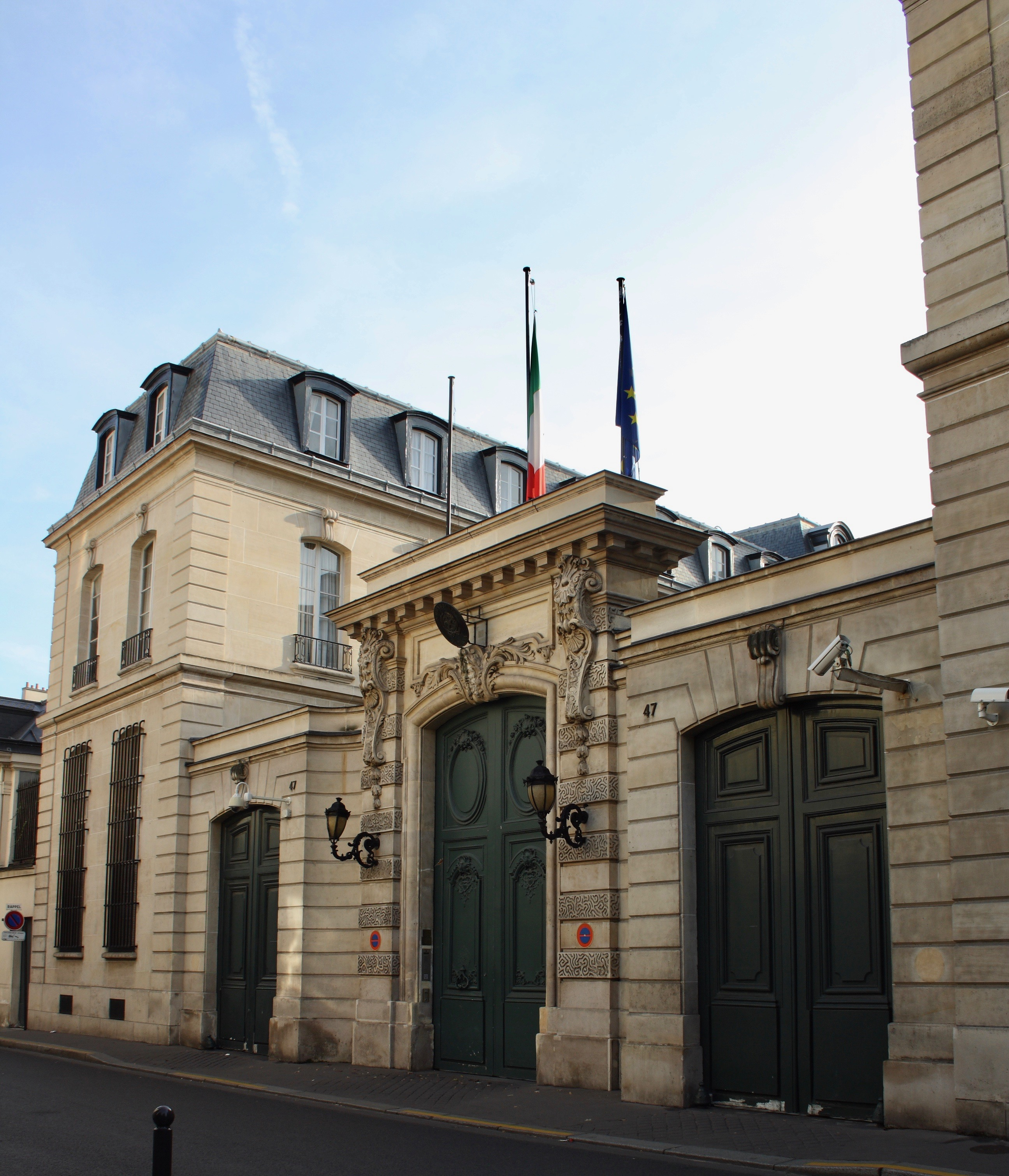
- Interactive map of the Hôtel de Boisgelin area
- Alternative names: Hôtel de La Rochefoucauld-Doudeauville

General information
- Type: Hôtel particulier
- Location: 47–49 Rue de Varenne, Paris, France
- Current tenants: Embassy of Italy, Paris (1938–present)
- Completed: 1732
- Client: Gérard Heusch de Janvry

Design and construction
- Architect: Jean-Sylvain Cartaud

The Hôtel de Boisgelin (French pronunciation: [otɛl də bwaʒ(ə)lɛ̃]), also known as the Hôtel de La Rochefoucauld-Doudeauville ([- la ʁɔʃfuko dudovil]), is an hôtel particulier on the Rue de Varenne in the 7th arrondissement of Paris, France. Since 1938 it has housed the Italian Embassy to France; previously it was housed in the neighbouring Hôtel de Galliffet. It has been listed since 1926 a monument historique by the Ministry of Culture.

== Location ==
The Hôtel de Boisgelin is located at 47–49 on the Rue de Varenne in the 7th arrondissement of Paris.

== History ==
The hôtel particulier as built in 1732 for Gérard Heusch de Janvry, a Secretary to the King of France. It was designed by French architect Jean-Sylvain Cartaud.

It is home to the Italian embassy in France.

== Bibliography ==
- Erminia Gentile Ortona; Maria Teresa Caracciolo; Mario Tavella, eds. (2009). L'Ambasciata d'Italia a Parigi. Hotel de La Rochefoucauld-Doudeauville (in Italian). Milan: Skira.
