= Château de Bayers =

French château

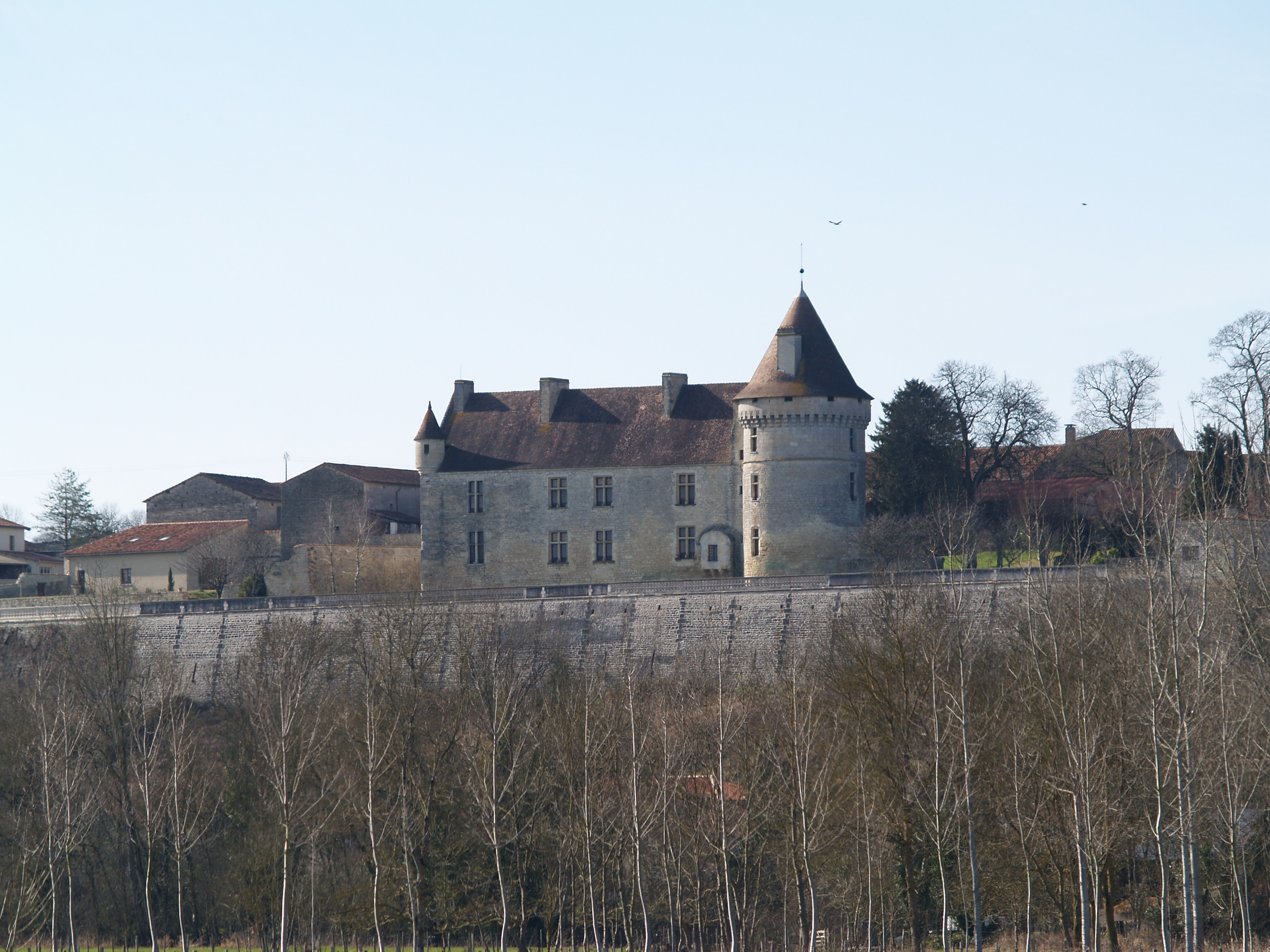
- February 2009
- Interactive map of the Château de Bayers area

General information
- Location: Bayers, Charente, France
- Coordinates: 45°55′12″N 0°13′45″E
- Construction started: 1434
- Client: Guillaume de La Rochefoucauld

The Château de Bayers is a historic château that is located in the commune of Bayers (which merged into the new commune, Aunac-sur-Charente, in 2017), in the French department of Charente in the Nouvelle-Aquitaine region. The château overlooks the Charente river and is about 30 kilometres (19 mi) north of Angoulême.

== History ==
A fortified quadrangular castle existed in the 11th century, built to monitor a ford across the Charente. It was partially destroyed during the Hundred Years' War. In 1295, the land of Bayers (pronounced "bay") passed to a cadet branch of the La Rochefoucauld family. In the 15th century, Guillaume de La Rochefoucauld converted the medieval fortress into the current château beginning in 1434. His descendants, thereafter called de La Rochefoucauld-Bayers, constructed a French garden on a terrace overlooking the river in the 17th century. Guy André Pierre de Montmorency-Laval, 1st Duke of Laval, was born at the château in 1723.

After the death of the Marquis of Bayers in 1745, the last La Rochefoucauld owner, Marie-Louise-Françoise de La Rochefoucauld-Bayers, sold the château, by then already in a state of disrepair, to the governor of Angoumois, Jean-Michel Delage, (Note: Delage had been a legal guardian of Agathe-Louise de Saint-Antoine de Saint-André (1754–1774), the illegitimate daughter of King Louis XV and his petite maîtresse, Marie-Louise O'Murphy. Agathe-Louise later married Mans-Jean-René de la Tour du Pin, Marquis de la Charce.) in 1788. Delage died in 1793 before being able to restore the château. In 1803, after the French Revolution, his widow sold the divided estate and château to various owners. After years without maintenance, the château fell into ruin during the 19th and first half of the 20th century.

In 1950, the penultimate owner bought the château in its entirety, but his sudden death led to the residence being sealed. In 1976, the château was opened and put up for sale again. It was bought by the current owners who intended to restore it. By 1986, after several restoration campaigns, the restoration of the château and remaining buildings was completed. The main building is rectangular and is situated parallel to the Charente. At its corner is a large round crenellated tower topped with a conical roof of flat tiles. The façade has a square staircase tower and a polygonal staircase tower, on the courtyard side.

=== Monument historique ===
The château was partially designated as a monument historique on 18 September 1989. All the buildings constituting the château were included on 22 April 2003 and the old garden, orangery and the surrounding walls a year later on 22 April 2004.

== Gallery ==
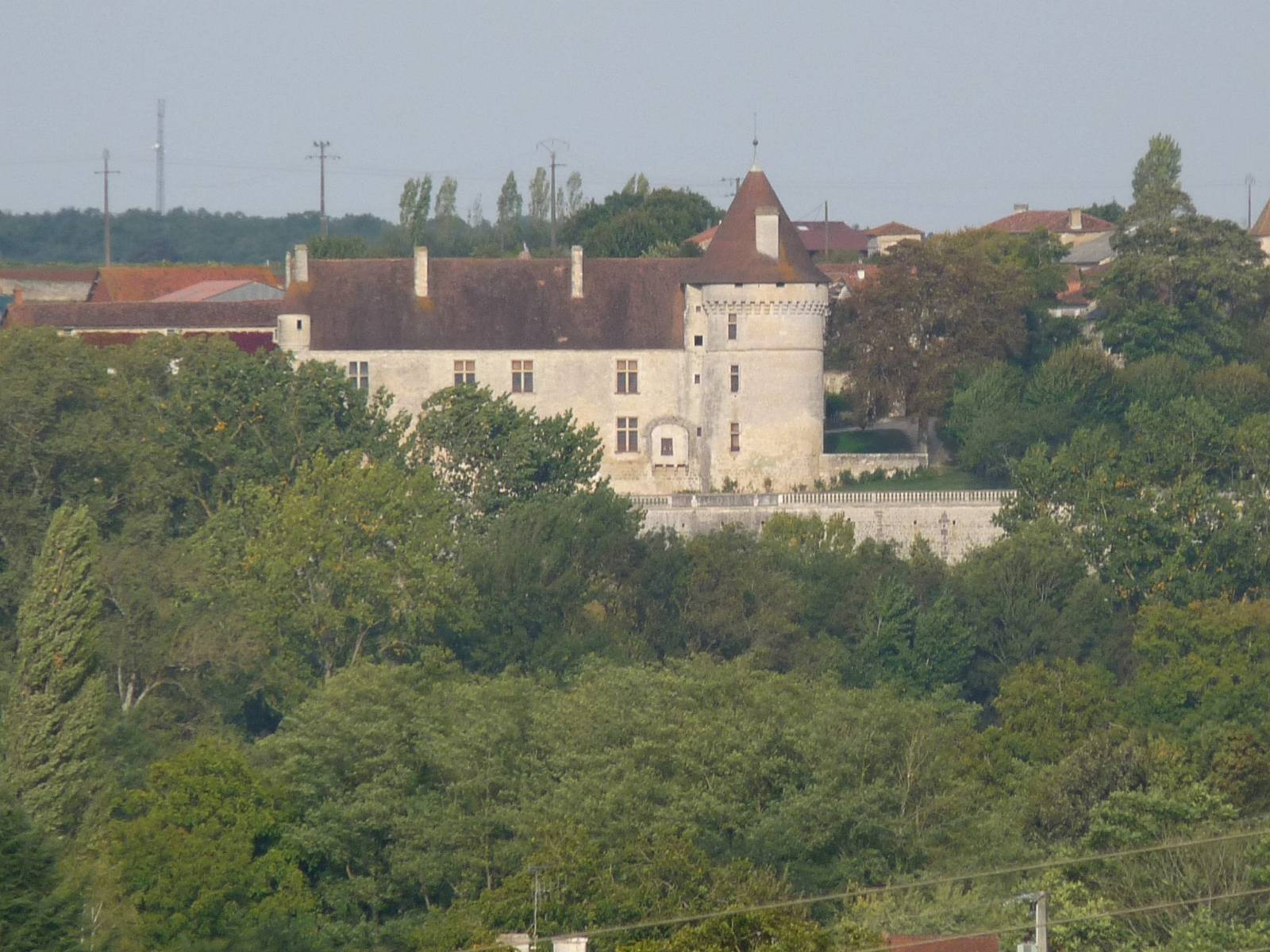
View from the east

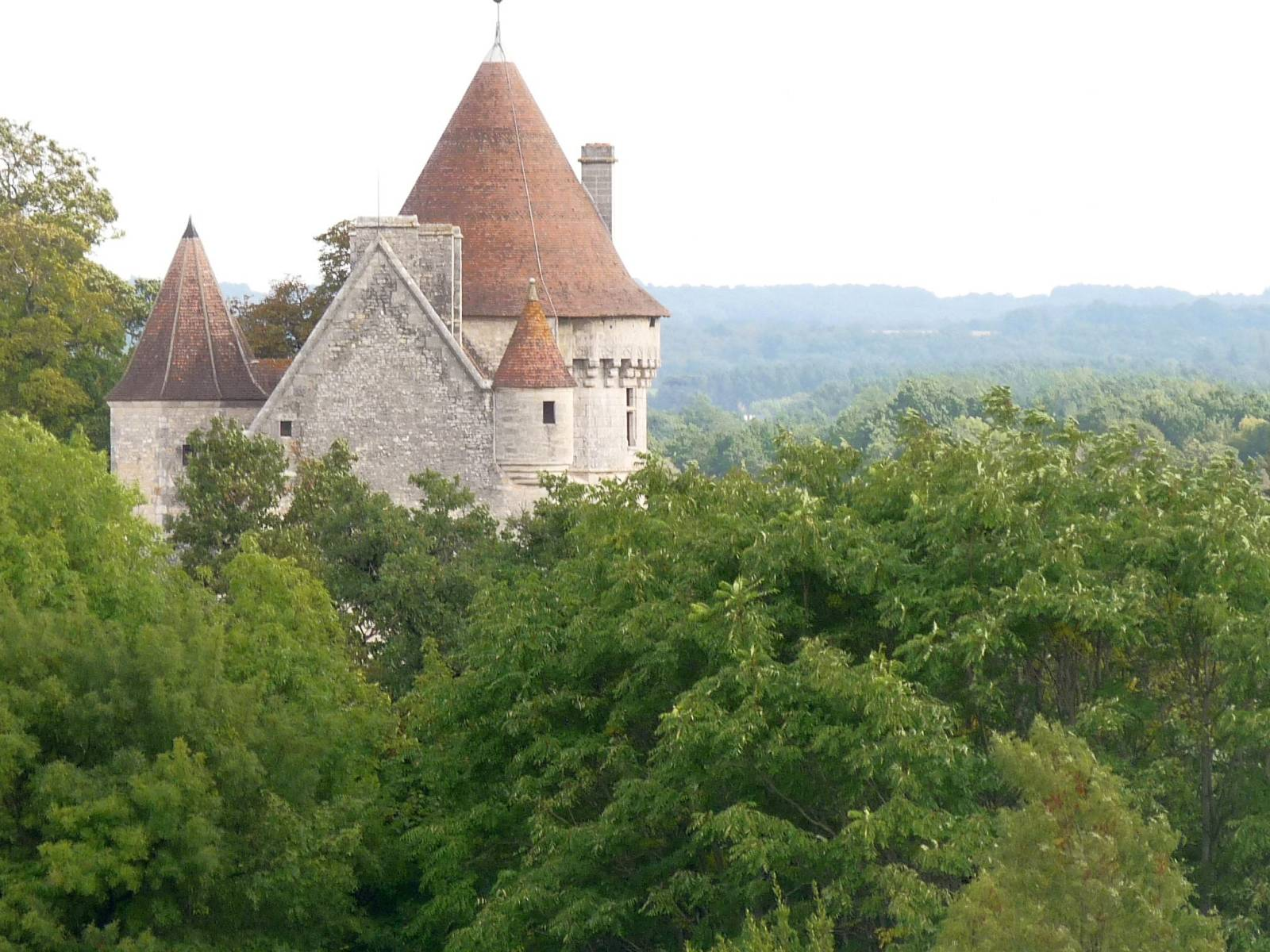
View from the south

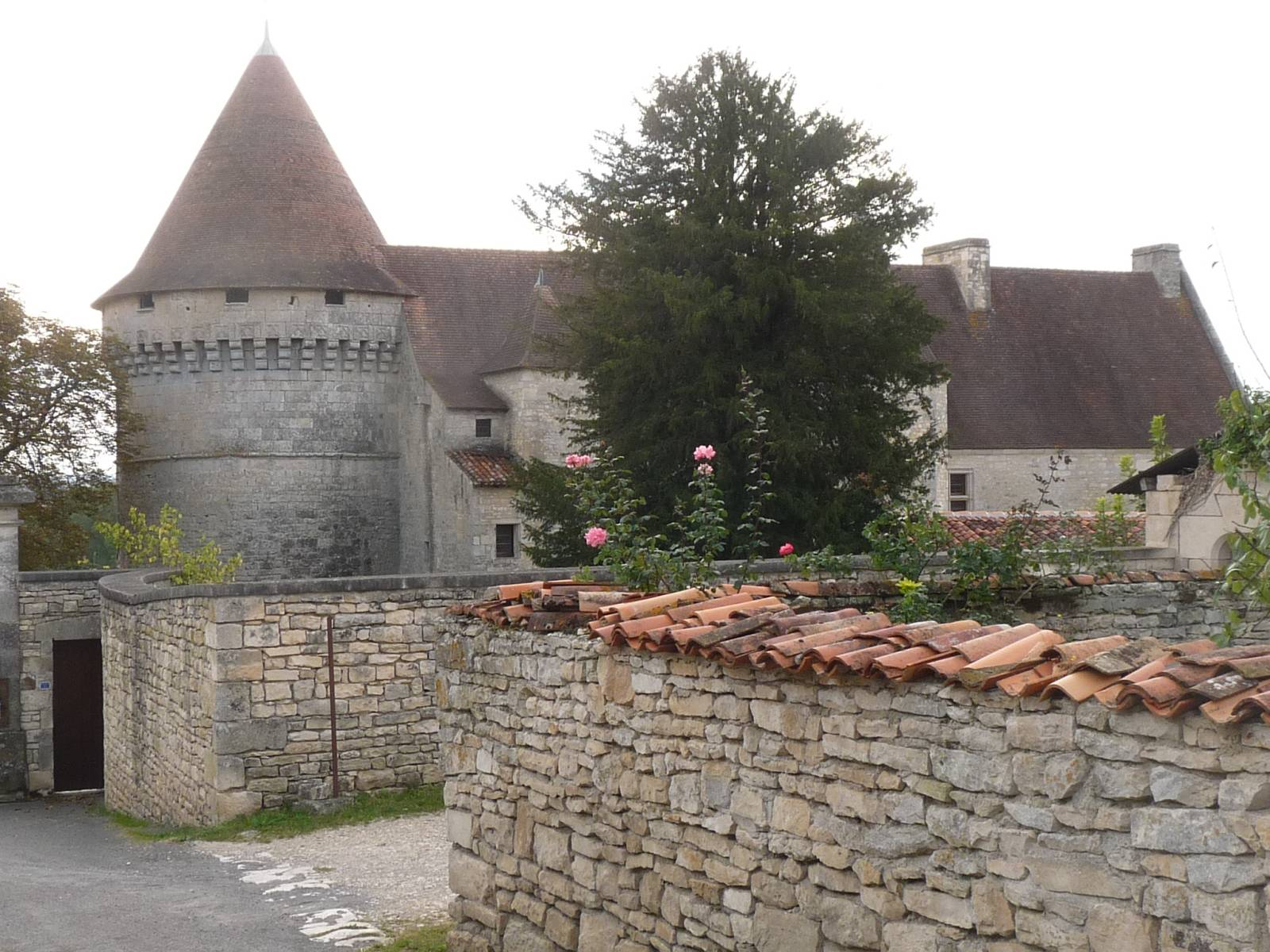
The entrance

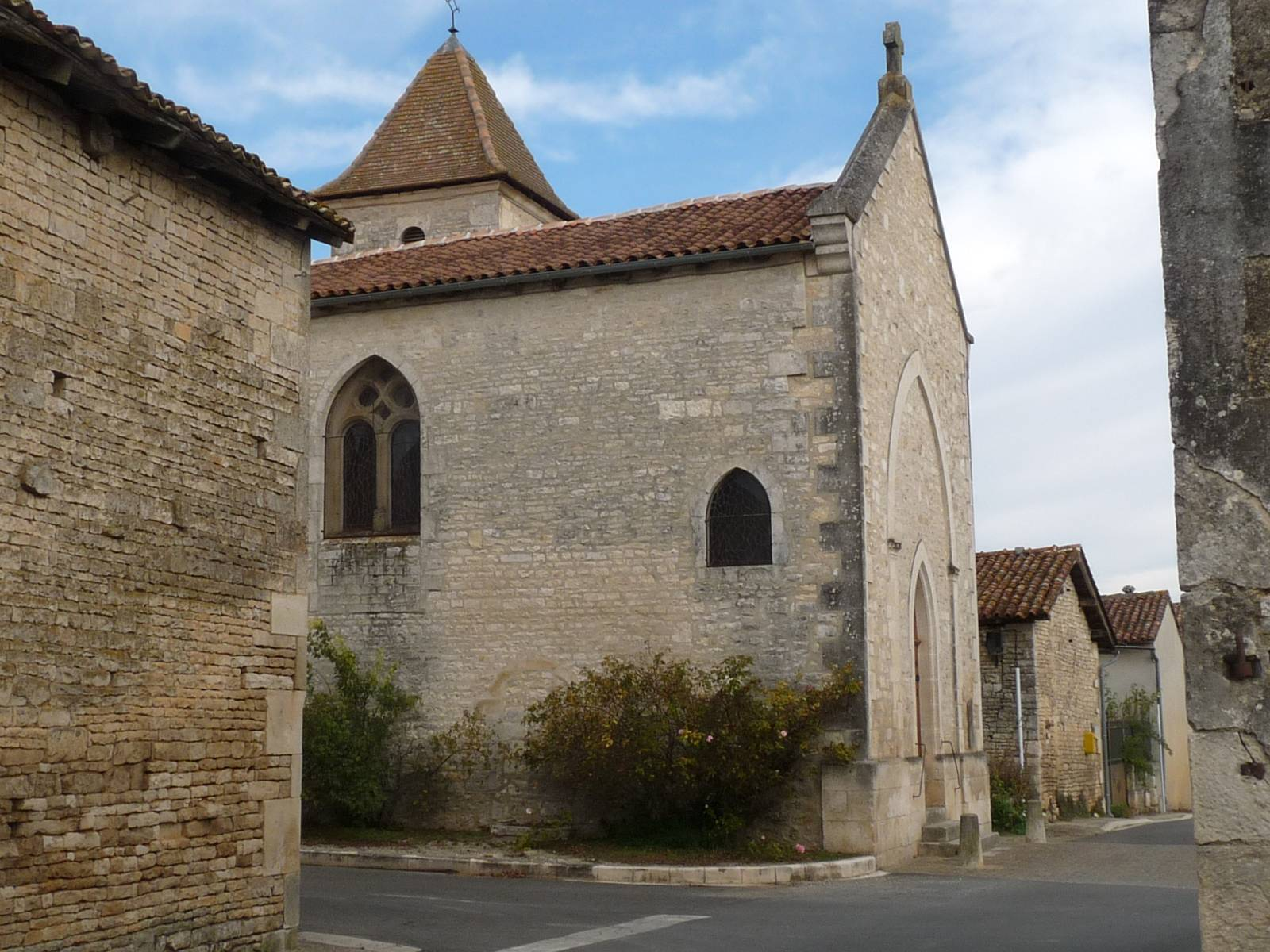
Church of Notre-Dame

== See also ==
- List of castles in France
