= Anne-Alexandre-Marie de Montmorency-Laval =

Alexandre de Montmorency-Laval
- Duke of Laval
- Born: Anne-Alexandre-Marie-Sulpice-Joseph de Montmorency-Laval; 22 January 1747; Paris, Kingdom of France
- Died: 30 March 1817 (aged 70); Paris, France
- Spouse: Marie Louise Mauricette de Montmorency-Luxembourg (m. 1764, died)
- House: House of Montmorency; House of Laval
- Father: Guy André Pierre de Montmorency-Laval
- Mother: Jacqueline de Bullion de Fervaques

Anne-Alexandre-Marie-Sulpice-Joseph de Montmorency-Laval, 2nd Duke of Laval (22 January 1747 – 30 March 1817) was a French politician and soldier.

== Early life ==
Montmorency-Laval was born in Paris on 22 January 1747. He was the second son of Guy André Pierre de Montmorency-Laval, 1st Duke of Laval (1723–1798), and Jacqueline de Bullion de Fervaques (1720–1795). His elder brother, Guy-André-Marie Joseph de Montmorency-Laval, styled Count of Laval, died of smallpox in 1761.

His paternal grandparents were Guy-André de Montmorency-Laval, Marquis of Lezay and Magnac, and Marie Anne de Turmenies de Nointel. His maternal grandparents were Anne Jacques de Bullion, Marquis of Fervaques, Lieutenant General of the King's Armies, and Marie Madeleine Hortense de Gigault de Bellefonds.

== Career ==
Beginning in 1773, the Duke was affiliated with Freemasonry. He fought with the Americans during the American Revolutionary War, and was a founding member of the Society of the Cincinnati. He was made Maréchal de camp in 1789, he chose to emigrate during the French Revolution.

During the Bourbon Restoration, he was made a "Life Peer" on 4 June 1814 and rose to the rank of Lieutenant-General on 8 June 1814. He voted for death at the trial of Marshal Michel Ney.

He was made a Commander of the Order of Saint-Louis.

== Personal life ==
In 1764, he married Marie Louise Mauricette de Montmorency-Luxembourg, daughter of Count Joseph Maurice Annibal de Montmorency-Luxembourg. Together, they were the parents of:

- Guy Marie Anne Louis de Montmorency-Laval, Marquis of Laval (1767–1786), who married Pauline Renée Sophie de Voyer de Paulmy d'Argenson.
- Anne-Adrien-Pierre de Montmorency-Laval, 1st Duke of San Fernando Luis, 3rd Duke of Laval (1768–1837), King Charles X's Ambassador of France to the United Kingdom from 1828 to 1830; he married Bonne Charlotte Renée Adélaïde de Montmorency-Luxembourg.
- Achille Jean Louis de Montmorency-Laval, Count of Laval (1772–1793), a minority Knight of Malta who died, unmarried, of a wound he received in the defense of Bundenthal, in the service of Army of Condé.
- Eugène-Alexandre de Montmorency-Laval, 4th Duke of Laval (1773–1851), who married Maximilienne Augustine de Béthune-Sully. After her death in 1833, he married Françoise Xavière Nicole Constance de Maistre.

The Duke died in Paris on 30 March 1817 and was buried in the Père Lachaise Cemetery. Upon his death, the peerage attached to the title of Duke of Laval was made hereditary.
