= Charles Marie d'Albert de Luynes =

French nobleman

The Duke of Luynes, Chevreuse and Chaulnes
- Coat of Arms of the Duke

Member of the Chamber of Peers
- In office 1814–1815, 1815–1830
- Monarchs: Louis XVIII; Charles X

Personal details
- Born: Charles Marie Paul André d'Albert de Luynes; 16 October 1783
- Died: 20 March 1839 (aged 55)
- Spouse: Françoise du Pelet de Narbonne-Fritzlar (m. 1800; died 1813)
- Children: Honoré Théodoric d'Albert de Luynes
- Parent(s): Louis Joseph d'Albert de Luynes; Guionne Élisabeth Joséphine de Montmorency-Laval

Charles Marie Paul André d'Albert, 7th Duke of Luynes (16 October 1783 – 20 March 1839) was a French aristocrat and politician.

== Early life ==
He was the only son of Louis Joseph d'Albert de Luynes, 6th Duke of Luynes, and Guionne Élisabeth Joséphine de Montmorency-Laval (1755–1830), a Dame du Palais of Queen Marie Antoinette (wife of Louis XVI). His sister was Pauline Hortense d'Albert de Luynes (wife of their cousin, Mathieu de Montmorency, 1st Duke of Montmorency-Laval).

His maternal grandfather was Guy André Pierre de Montmorency-Laval, 1st Duke of Laval. His paternal grandparents were Charles Louis d'Albert, 5th Duke of Luynes, and Henriette Nicole d'Egmont-Pignatelli. Among his extended family were his aunt, Marie Paule Angélique d'Albert (who married Louis Joseph d'Albert d'Ailly, 7th Duke of Chaulnes), and his niece (through his sister Pauline), Elisabeth-Hélène-Pierre de Montmorency Laval (wife of Sosthènes I de La Rochefoucauld, 2nd Duke of Doudeauville).

== Career ==
In 1792, upon the death of Louis Joseph d'Albert, 6th Duke of Chaulnes (and Duke of Picquigny), he inherited the dukedom of Chaulnes, from a distant cousin of a cadet branch of the d'Albert family, becoming the 7th Duke of Chaulnes. (Note: The dukedom of Chaulnes had been created in 1621 for Honoré d'Albert (1581–1649), younger brother to Charles d'Albert, 1st Duke of Luynes. Louis Joseph d'Albert, 6th Duke of Chaulnes (1741–1792), and Charles Marie d'Albert de Luynes, were both direct descendants of Charles Honoré d'Albert, 3rd Duke of Luynes (with Louis Joseph being descended from the 3rd Duke's younger son, Louis Auguste d'Albert, 4th Duke of Chaulnes (1678–1744), and Charles Marie being descended from the 3rd Duke's eldest surviving son, Honoré Charles d'Albert de Luynes (1669–1704)).) Upon the death of his father in 1807, he inherited the dukedoms of Luynes and Chevreuse (Note: Today, the Duke of Chaulnes title is carried today as a courtesy title by a younger brother of the penultimate Duke of Luynes.)

During the First Restoration, he was a member of the Chamber of Peers, serving from 1814 to 1815, then again from 1815 to 1817. He was Duke-Peer of France from 1817 to 1830, under the Second Bourbon Restoration.

== Personal life ==
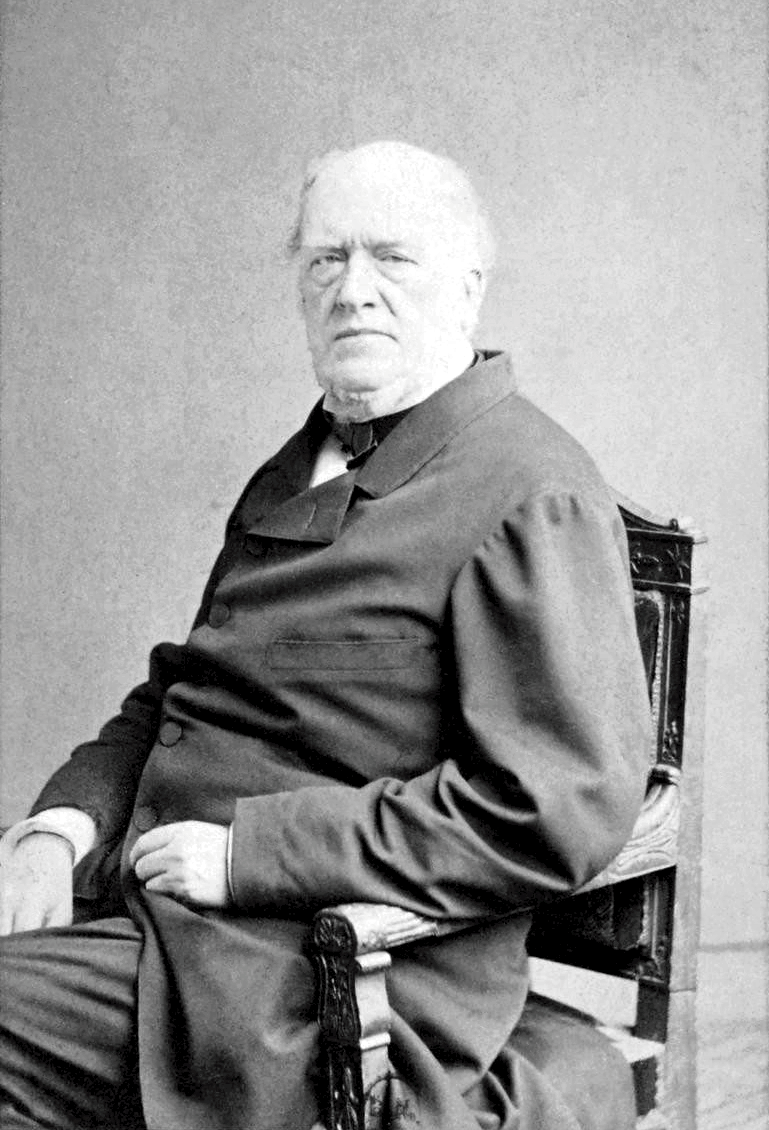
Photograph of his son, Honoré, by Louis-Auguste Bisson, c. 1860

On 24 February 1800, he Duke married Françoise Marie Félicité Ermesinde du Pelet de Narbonne-Fritzlar (1785–1813), a daughter of Count Francois-Bernard de Narbonne de Pelet and Adelaide Le Contede Nonant de Pierrecourt. Marie served as a Dame du Palais to Empress Joséphine (wife of Napoleon) before her premature death in Lyon in 1813. Together, they were the parents of:

- Honoré Théodoric d'Albert de Luynes (1802–1867), who married Marie Françoise Dauvet de Maineville, daughter of Gabriel Nicolas Dauvet, Marquis de Maineville, in 1822. After her death, he married Jeanne d'Amys de Ponceau, in 1846.

The Duke died on 20 March 1839 and was succeeded in his dukedoms by his son, Honoré, who used the Duke of Luynes title and the Duke of Chaulnes as a courtesy title.

== Sources ==
French nobility
Preceded by Louis Joseph d'Albert de Luynes	Duke of Luynes; 1807–1839	Succeeded by Honoré Théodoric d'Albert de Luynes
Preceded by Louis Joseph d'Albert de Luynes	Duke of Chevreuse; 1807–1839	Succeeded by Honoré Théodoric d'Albert de Luynes
Preceded by Louis Joseph d'Albert d'Ailly	Duke of Chaulnes; 1792–1839	Succeeded by Honoré Théodoric d'Albert de Luynes
