= Louis Joseph d'Albert de Luynes =

French politician, nobleman and member of the House of Albert

The Duke of Luynes and Chevreuse
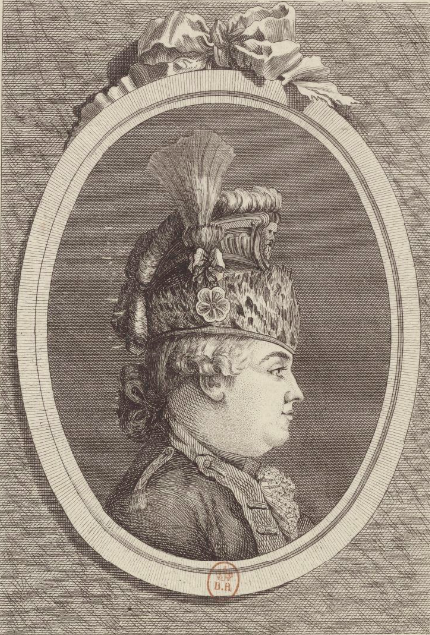
- Engraving of the 6th Duke of Luynes

Deputy to the Estates-General for the Second Estate
- In office 12 April 1789 – 9 July 1789

Personal details
- Born: Louis Joseph Charles Amable d'Albert de Luynes; 4 November 1748 Paris, Kingdom of France
- Died: 13 May 1807 (aged 58) Paris, French Republic
- Spouse: Guionne Élisabeth de Montmorency-Laval (m. 1768; died 1807)
- Children: Pauline Hortense d'Albert de Luynes; Charles Marie d'Albert de Luynes
- Parent(s): Charles Louis d'Albert, 5th Duke of Luynes; Henriette Nicole d'Egmont-Pignatelli
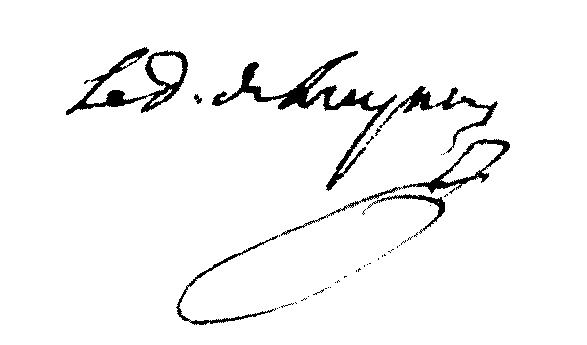
- Signature

Louis Joseph Charles Amable d'Albert, 6th Duke of Luynes (4 November 1748 – 13 May 1807) was a French politician, nobleman and member of the House of Albert. He was the sixth Duke of Luynes as well as Duke of Chevreuse.

== Early life ==
Coat of arms of the 6th Duke of Luynes

Luynes was born in Paris on 4 November 1748. He was the son of Charles Louis d'Albert, 5th Duke of Luynes (1717–1771) and Henriette Nicole d'Egmont-Pignatelli (1719–1782). His elder siblings were Charles Marie Léopold d'Albert, Count of Dunois, and Marie Paule Angélique d'Albert (who married their cousin Louis Joseph d'Albert d'Ailly, 7th Duke of Chaulnes).

His father was the only child of Charles Philippe d'Albert, 4th Duke of Luynes and his wife Louise Léontine de Bourbon, Princess of Neuchatel (a granddaughter of Louis de Bourbon, Count of Soissons). After his grandmother's death in 1721, his grandfather married Marie Brûlart (the widow of the Marquis de Charost, who became a lady-in-waiting to the Queen Maria, consort of King Louis XV).

== Career ==
In 1768, his father transferred the title, Duke of Chevreuse, to Louis Joseph. Three years later in 1771 upon his father's death, he succeeded as the 6th Duke of Luynes as his elder brother, Charles, died unmarried in 1758. He was a Peer of France, Maréchal de camp, Mestre de camp Colonel-General of the Dragoons.

The Duke was a Deputy to the Estates General of 1789 as a member of the Second Estate (the nobility). After the Estates General was disbanded, some members of the Third Estate (the commoners) formed the National Assembly and, against the wishes of the King, invited the other two estates to join; this signaled the outbreak of the French Revolution. After the Revolution, he was also a member of the Sénat conservateur (Conservative Senate) who were in service during the First French Empire (the French empire which was ruled by Napoleon Bonaparte).

== Personal life ==
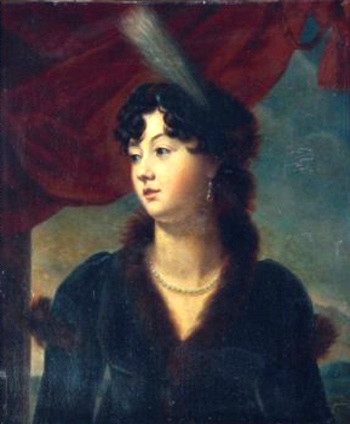
Portrait of his granddaughter, Élisabeth (née de Montmorency-Laval), Duchess of Doudeauville

On 19 April 1768 Luynes married Guionne Élisabeth Joséphine de Montmorency-Laval (1755–1830), the daughter of Guy André Pierre de Montmorency-Laval, 1st Duke of Laval. His maternal grandparents were François-Bernard de Narbonne, Count of Pelet and Adelaide Le Conte de Nonant de Pierrecourt. Together, they were the parents of:

- Pauline Hortense d'Albert de Luynes (1774–1858), who married her cousin, Mathieu de Montmorency, 1st Duke of Montmorency-Laval.
- Charles Marie d'Albert de Luynes (1783–1839), 7th Duke of Luynes, who married Françoise Ermessinde de Narbonne-Pelet, a daughter of Count Francois-Bernard de Narbonne de Pelet and Adelaide Le Conte de Nonant de Pierrecourt.

The Duke died in Paris on 13 May 1807 was buried at the Panthéon de Paris. Upon his death in 1807, he was succeeded in the dukedom of Luynes by his son, Charles. His widow died in 1830 at the Château d'Esclimont.

=== Descendants ===
Through his daughter Pauline, he was a grandfather of Elisabeth-Hélène-Pierre de Montmorency Laval (1790–1834), who married Sosthènes I de La Rochefoucauld, 2nd Duke of Doudeauville.

Through his son Charles, he was a grandfather of Honoré Théodoric d'Albert de Luynes (1802–1867), who married Marie Françoise Dauvet de Maineville (a daughter of Gabriel Nicolas Dauvet, Marquis de Maineville).

French nobility
Preceded by Charles Louis d'Albert de Luynes	Duke of Luynes; 1771–1807	Succeeded by Charles Marie d'Albert de Luynes
Preceded by Charles Louis d'Albert de Luynes	Duke of Chevreuse; 1768–1807	Succeeded by Charles Marie d'Albert de Luynes
