= Honoré Théodoric d'Albert de Luynes =

French noble and academic (1802–1867)

The Duke of Luynes, Chevreuse, and Chaulnes
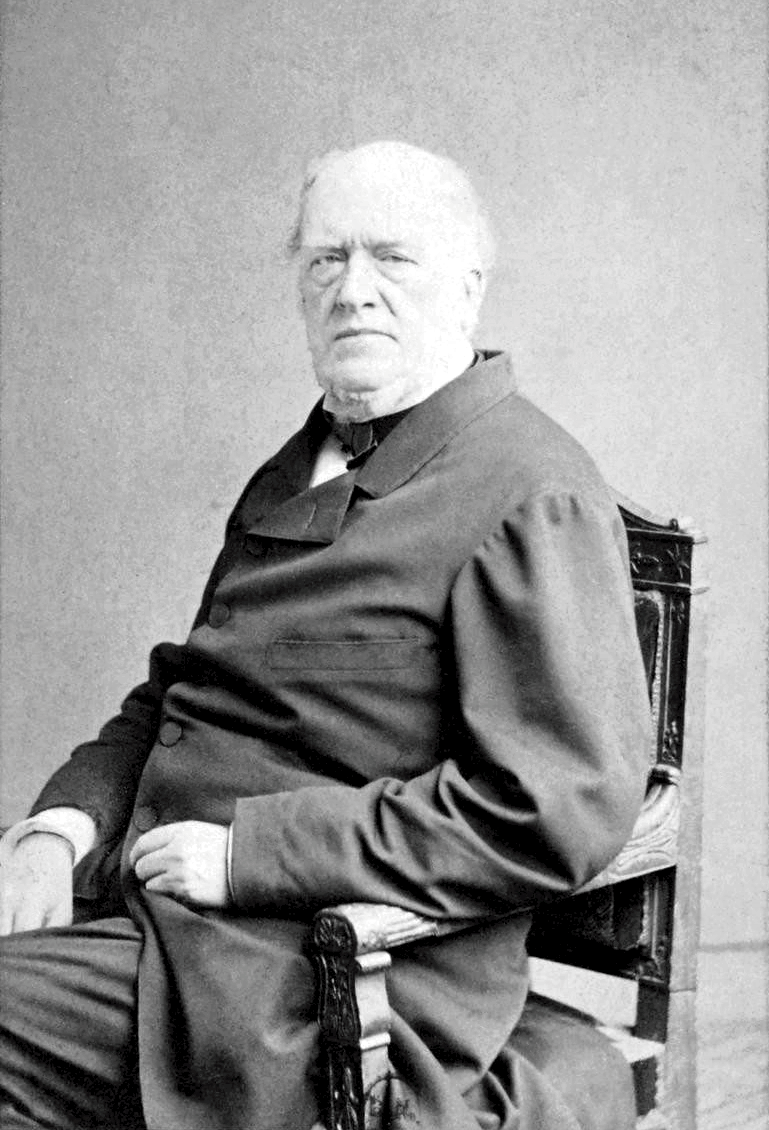
- Photograph of the Duke of Luynes, by Louis-Auguste Bisson, c. 1860

Personal details
- Born: Honoré Théodore Paul Joseph d'Albert; 15 December 1802 Paris, France
- Died: 15 December 1867 (aged 65) Rome, Italy
- Spouses: Marie Francoise Dauvet de Maineville (m. 1822; died 1824) Jeanne d'Amys de Ponceau (m. 1846; died 1861)
- Children: Honoré-Louis d'Albert de Luynes
- Parent(s): Charles Marie d'Albert de Luynes; Françoise Ermessinde de Narbonne-Pelet

Honoré Théodore Paul Joseph d'Albert, 8th Duke of Luynes (15 December 1802 – 15 December 1867) was a wealthy French nobleman and scholar. He is most remembered for the collection of exhibits he gave to the Cabinet des Médailles in 1862, and for supporting the exiled Comte de Chambord's claim to the throne of France. Throughout his life, D'Albert inherited a number of French titles, including Duke of Luynes, de Chevreuse, and de Chaulnes.

== Early life ==
D'Albert was born on 15 December 1802 in Paris. He was the eldest son of Charles Marie d'Albert de Luynes (1783–1839) and Françoise Ermessinde de Narbonne-Pelet. His paternal grandparents were Louis Joseph Charles Amable d'Albert, 6th Duke of Luynes and Elisabeth of Montmorency-Laval, the daughter of Guy André Pierre de Montmorency-Laval, 1st Duke of Laval. His maternal grandparents were Francois-Bernard de Narbonne, Count of Pelet and Adelaide Le Conte de Nonant de Pierrecourt.

His youthful Grand Tour to Italy was marred by the death of his companion, his cousin Henri de Montmorency-Laval; he returned to join Louis XVIII's garde du corps.

== Career ==
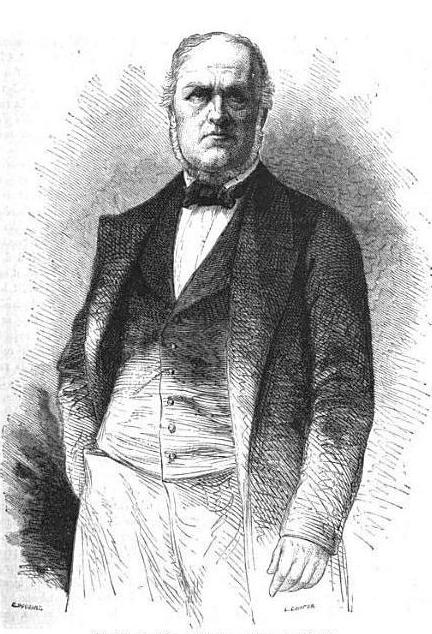
Engraving of the Duke of Luynes (after a photograph by André-Adolphe-Eugène Disdéri)

After his first wife's death in 1824, he returned to Italy, consoling himself with researches at the site of Metapontum in the Kingdom of Two Sicilies, which he published, and at the age of twenty-eight was received by the Académie des Inscriptions et Belles-Lettres; his archaeological interests ranged from ancient numismatics and ceramics, the subject of his collections, to recovering the secrets of damscening steel: he received a silver medal for his blades at the Exposition of 1844. He offered a prize of 8000 livres for the first successful process of photolithography while he was assembling one of the finest contemporary natural history collections in France at his château de Dampierre. His collection of ancient coins, medals, engraved stones and Greek vases, he donated to the Cabinet des Médailles. His archaeological interests took him as far as the Dead Sea and to Petra, in May 1864.

At Dampierre he commissioned extensive renovations under the antiquarian architect Félix Duban, who had restored the Château de Blois. Paintings by Marc-Charles-Gabriel Gleyre and Jean-Hippolyte Flandrin graced the gallery walls that were hung with red velvet, against which Luynes also mounted trophies of his antique arms, the prize piece of which was the ceremonial sword of Youssuf, son of Boabdil, the last Moorish king of Granada; it followed Luynes' collections to the Cabinet des Médailles. He was quite naturally the head of the committee reporting on metalwork at the Great Exhibition of 1851, and published his findings.

He was also a patron of living classicizing artists, with varying success. In 1840 he commissioned Charles Gleyre to paint murals in the Grand Gallery at Dampierre, but after Gleyre had worked on them for a year, with the prospects of fame before him, the installed decorations were effaced when Félix Duban inspired Luynes to commission Jean Auguste Dominique Ingres, recently returned from Rome, to paint large canvases for the Gallery instead. Ingres insisted on frescoing the gallery at Dampierre with the grand subjects Luynes requested, The Age of Gold and The Age of Iron, rather than providing canvases. Ingres installed himself enthusiastically at Dampierre for the project, for which the gallery was replastered to his orders; many drawings and sketches for the proposed works survive, and Luynes' classicizing bent encouraged Ingres' obsessive search for suitable inspiration but Ingres' ardor cooled by 1847, and the contract was eventually cancelled in 1850. From François Rude Luynes commissioned a sculpture of the king who had founded the fortunes of his family; the Louis XIII as a Child was cast in silver rather than bronze. For the Penelope of the sculptor Pierre-Jules Cavelier he paid more than the sculptor asked, and he commissioned Pierre-Charles Simart to recreate the Athena of Phidias, in ivory and gold, based on ancient descriptions: "it cost Luynes a hundred thousand francs to prove that Simart was not Phidias". The bloodstone cup with enamelled gold mounts made for him in 1854-55 by Jean-Valentin Morel, who pioneered the taste for gold-mounted hardstones in neo-Renaissance taste, is now at the Indianapolis Museum of Art.

His politics were liberal. He took an active part in the Revolution of 1830, equipping and arming at his own expense a contingent of National Guard, but refused the offer from the July Monarchy of a pairie but consented to be appointed a representative of the Second Republic, 1848–51, where his role was that of an independent, before he withdrew to Dampierre with the rise of Napoleon III. He was awarded the Prussian order Pour le Mérite in 1853. Yet he died at Rome, a defender of the Papacy against the resurgent powers of a united Italy.

== Personal life ==
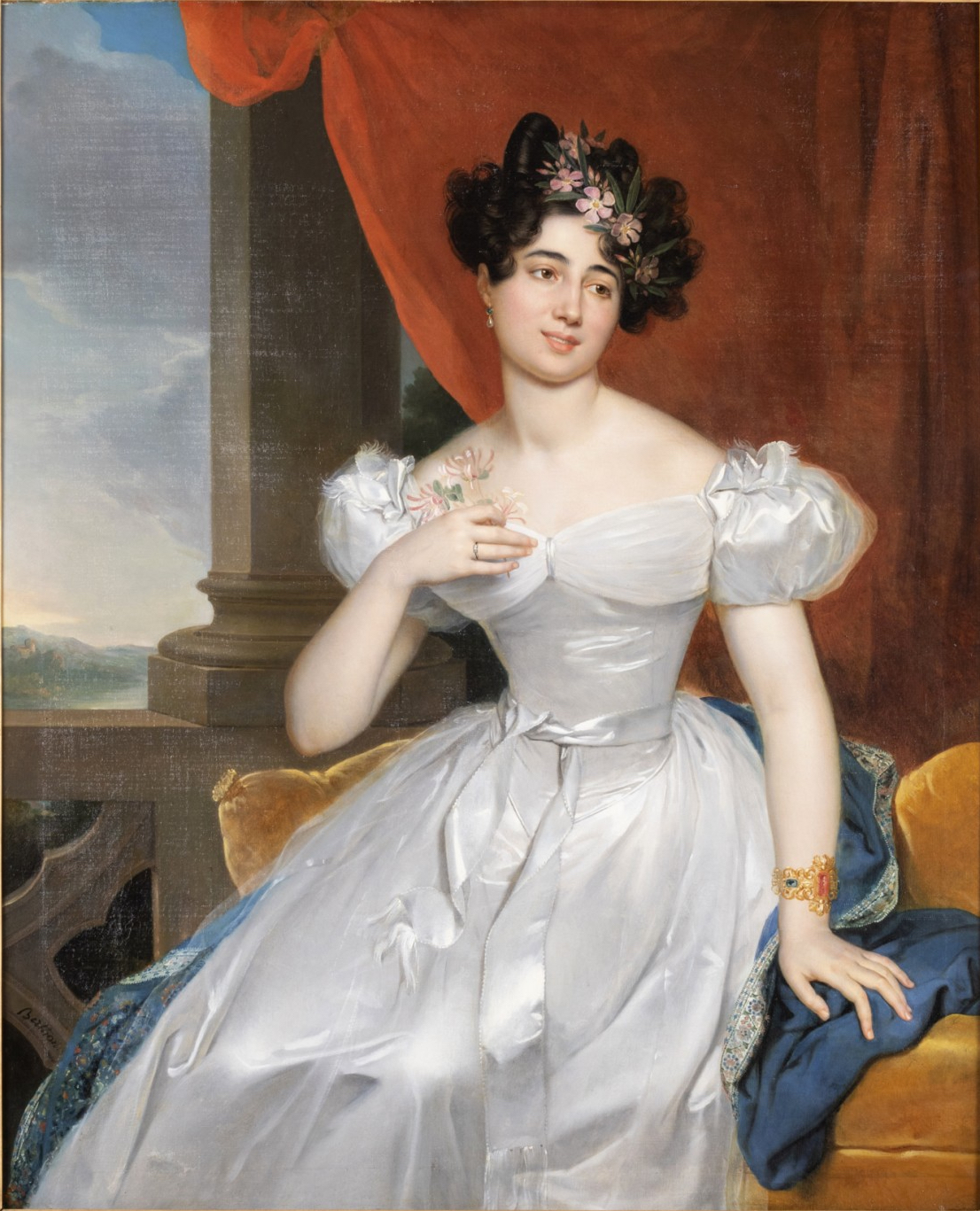
Portrait of his daughter-in-law, Valentine de Contades, by René Théodore Berthon

In 1822 married Marie Françoise Dauvet de Maineville, daughter of Gabriel Nicolas Dauvet, Marquis de Maineville, and Marie-Françoise Vachon de Belmont-Briançon. Before her early death on 23 July 1824, she and d'Albert had one son:

- Honoré-Louis d'Albert de Luynes, Duke of Chevreuse (1823–1854), who married Julie Valentine de Contades (1824–1900), a daughter of Jules Gaspard Amour de Contades (son of François-Jules de Contades) and Gabrielle Adèle Alexandrine Amys du Ponceau.

His second wife was Jeanne d'Amys de Ponceau, whom he married on March 19, 1846. She died on July 26, 1861, in Dampierre. The Duke died in Rome on 15 December 1867.

=== Descendants ===
Through his son Honoré-Louis, he was a grandfather of Marie Julie d'Albert de Luynes (the wife of Elzéar Charles Antoine de Sabran-Pontevès, 3rd Duke of Sabran), Charles Honoré Emmanuel d'Albert de Luynes, 9th Duke of Luynes (1846–1870), and Paul Marie Stanislas Honoré d'Albert de Luynes, 10th Duke of Chaulnes (1852–1881).

== Publications ==
Luynes was responsible for numerous papers and reports. His major publications are:

- Métaponte (Paris:P. Renouard) 1833;
- Commentaire historique et chronologique sur les éphémérides, intitulées Diurnali di messer Matteo di Giovenazzo (Paris: Firmin Didot) 1839;
- Description de quelques vases peints (Laborde, Paris, 1840). Luynes' collection of Greek pottery;
- Choix de médailles grecques, (Paris: Firmin Didot) 1840;
- Essai sur la numismatique des Satrapies et de la Phénicie sous les rois Achæménides (Paris: Firmin Didot, 1846);
- Numismatique et inscriptions cypriotes(Paris:Plon 1852);
- Mémoire sur le sarcophage et l'inscription funéraire d'Esmunazar, roi de Sidon, (Paris: Plon), 1856;
- Voyage d'exploration à la mer Morte, à Petra et sur la rive gauche du Jordan Published posthumously by the comte de Vogüé from Luynes' notes

== Notes ==
French nobility
Preceded by Charles Marie d'Albert de Luynes	Duke of Luynes; 1839–1867	Succeeded by Charles Honoré Emmanuel d'Albert de Luynes
Preceded by Charles Marie d'Albert de Luynes	Duke of Chevreuse; 1839–1867	Succeeded by Charles Honoré Emmanuel d'Albert de Luynes
Preceded by Charles Marie d'Albert de Luynes	Duke of Chaulnes and Picquigny; 1839–1852	Succeeded by Paul Marie Stanislas Honoré d'Albert
