= Eugène-Alexandre de Montmorency-Laval =

French nobleman

- Duke of Laval; Marquis of Montmorency
- Born: Eugène-Alexandre de Montmorency-Laval; 20 July 1773
- Died: 2 April 1851 (aged 77)
- Spouse: Maximilienne de Béthune-Sully (m. 1802; died 1833) Constance de Maistre (m. 1833; died 1851)
- House: House of Montmorency; House of Laval
- Father: Anne-Alexandre-Marie de Montmorency-Laval
- Mother: Marie Louise Mauricette de Montmorency-Luxembourg

Eugène-Alexandre de Montmorency-Laval, 4th Duke of Laval (20 July 1773 – 2 April 1851), was a 19th-century French soldier.

== Early life ==
Eugène-Alexandre was born on 20 July 1773. He was the fourth son of Anne-Alexandre-Marie de Montmorency-Laval, 2nd Duke of Laval, and Marie-Louise de Montmorency-Luxembourg (1750–1829), a daughter of Count Joseph Maurice Annibal de Montmorency-Luxembourg. Among his siblings were elder brother, Anne-Adrien-Pierre de Montmorency-Laval, the French ambassador to the United Kingdom.

His paternal grandparents were Guy André Pierre de Montmorency-Laval, 1st Duke of Laval, and Jacqueline de Bullion de Fervaques.

== Career ==
Like his elder brother Achille (who died of a wound he received in the defense of Bundenthal), he fought in the campaigns of 1793, 1794 and 1795, in the Army of Condé. Returning to France, he became a member of the right-wing royalist organisation known as the Chevaliers de la Foi (Knights of Faith).

He became Marshal of the King's Camps and Armies and a Knight of the Royal and Military Order of Saint-Louis, before he was promoted to Lieutenant-General of the Armies.

In 1837, he inherited the title of Duke of Laval from his brother Anne-Adrien-Pierre. Before that, he was called the Marquis of Montmorency.

== Personal life ==
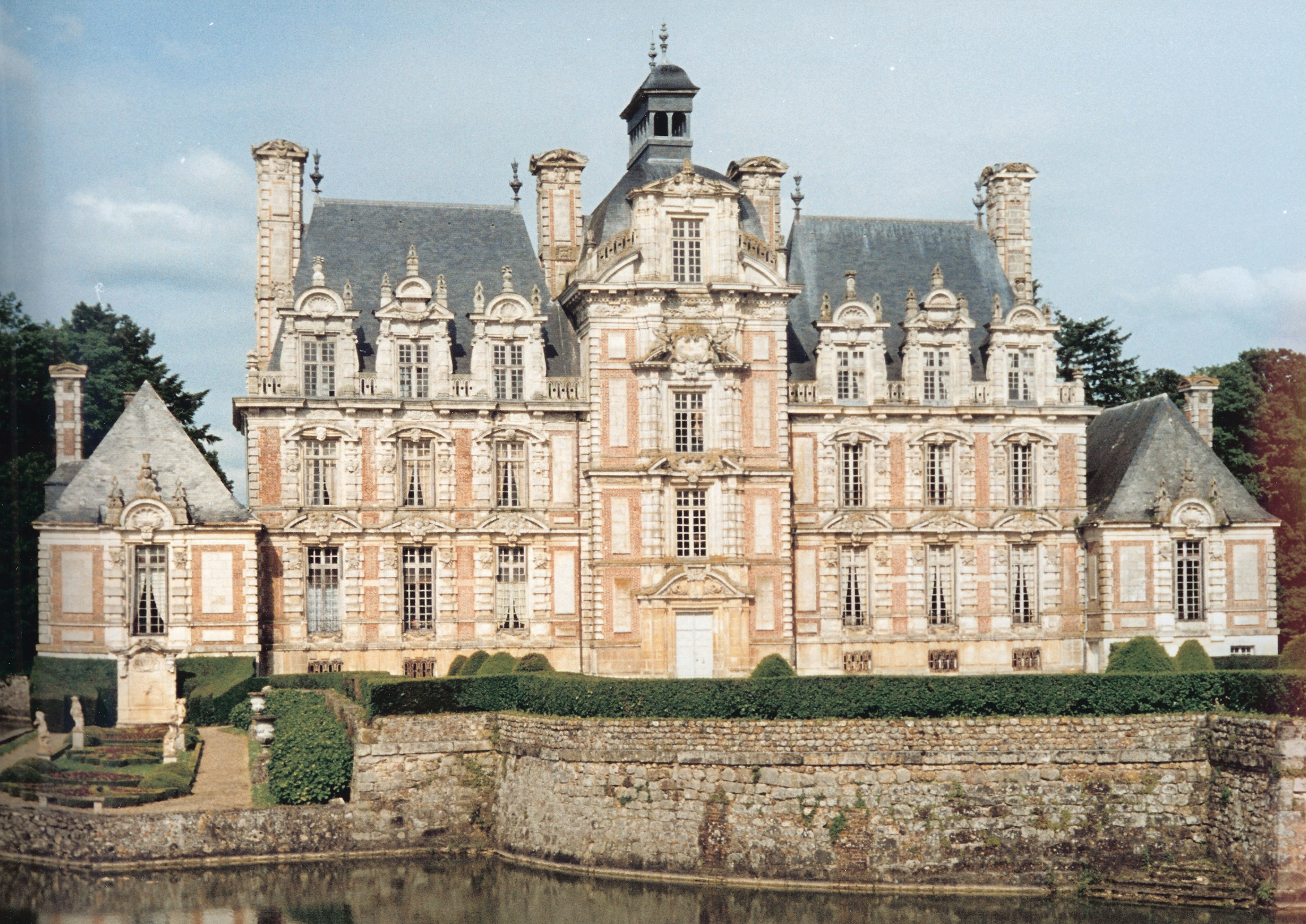
The west façade of the Château de Beaumesnil

In 1802, he married Maximilienne de Béthune-Sully (1772–1833), widow of the Count of Chârost, heiress to the Château de Beaumesnil. Having vowed to have a chapel built there if the Bourbons returned to power, they kept their word on the accession of King Louis XVIII and the chapel was consecrated in 1820.

After the death of his first wife, he married Françoise Xavière Nicole Constance de Maistre (1793–1882) on 26 November 1833 in Genoa. She was a daughter of Joseph de Maistre, Count of Maistre, a philosopher who was the author of the St Petersburg Dialogues.

The Duke died, without issue, on 2 April 1851, upon which the dukedom of Laval became extinct. He left the Château de Beaumesnil to his brother-in-law, Rodolphe de Maistre, Count of Maistre.

French nobility
Preceded by Anne-Adrien-Pierre de Montmorency-Laval	Duke of Laval; 1837–1851	Extinct
