= Montmorency-Laval =

Montmorency-Laval is a surname. Notable people with the surname include:

- Francois de Montmorency Laval, M.E.P. (1623–1708), the first Roman Catholic bishop of Quebec, appointed by Pope Alexander VII
- Mathieu Jean Felicite de Montmorency-Laval, Duc de Montmorency (1767–1826), prominent French statesman during the French Revolution and Bourbon Restoration
- Anne de Montmorency-Laval (1385–1466), medieval French noblewoman
- Anne-Adrien-Pierre de Montmorency-Laval (1768–1837), 3rd Duc de Laval and a peer of France
- Gilles de Montmorency-Laval (1405–1440), Baron de Rais, leader in the French army, companion-in-arms of Joan of Arc, and a confessed serial killer of children
- Guy-André de Montmorency-Laval (1686–1745), Marquis of Lezay and Magnac, Baron of La Marche, French soldier involved in the Cellamare conspiracy.
- Guy André Pierre de Montmorency-Laval (1723–1798), 1st duke of Laval, premier baron of Marche, marquis de Lezay, French general and marshal of France
- Louis-Joseph de Montmorency-Laval, French cardinal of the Catholic Church and Bishop of Metz at the time of the French Revolution
