= Beaumesnil =

Beaumesnil may refer to places in France:

- Beaumesnil, Calvados
- Beaumesnil, Eure
