= Moutonneau =

- Part of Aunac-sur-Charente
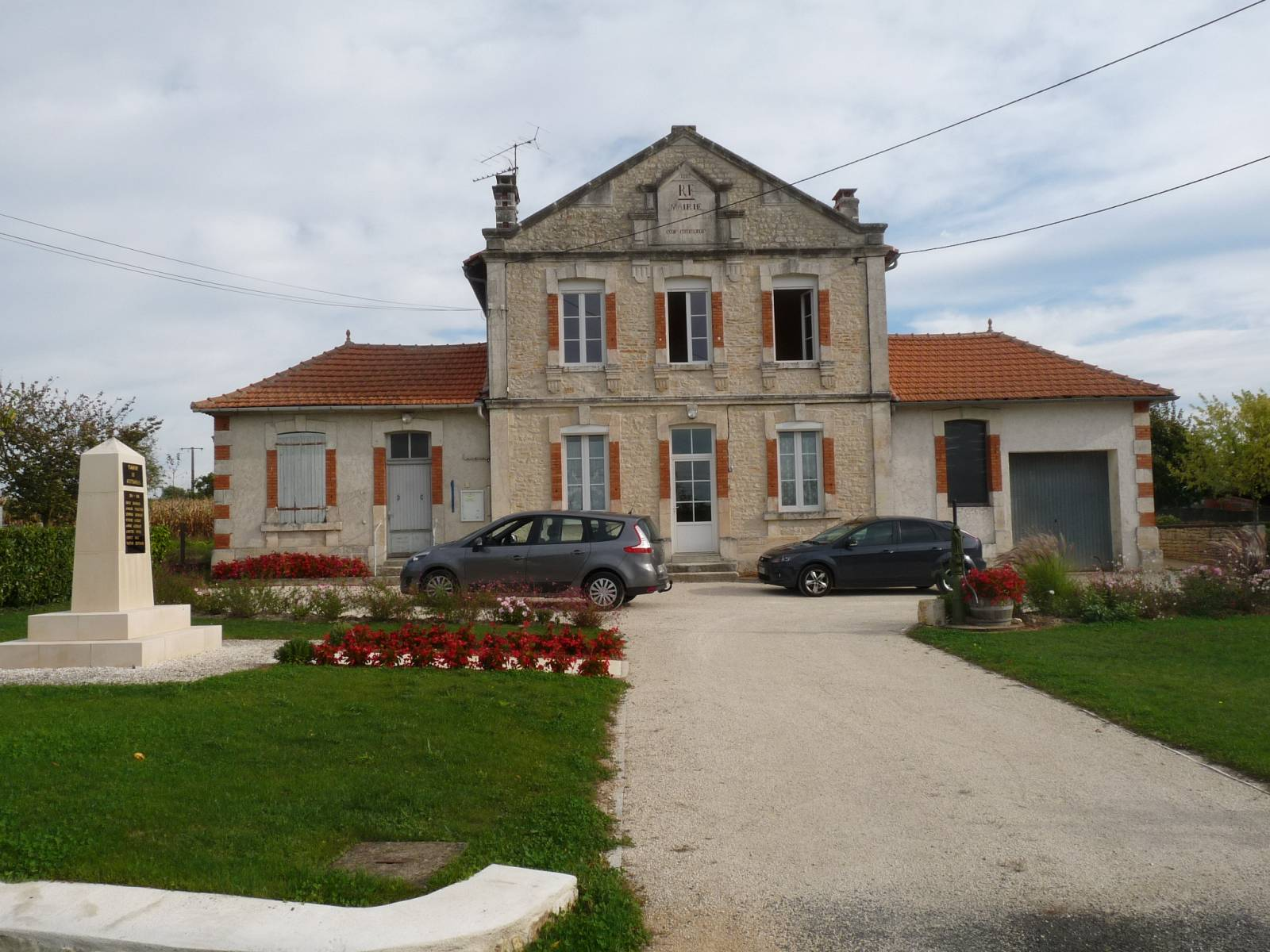
- Town hall
- Location of Moutonneau
- Location within France Location within Nouvelle-Aquitaine
- Coordinates: 45°54′29″N 0°14′17″E
- Country: France
- Region: Nouvelle-Aquitaine
- Department: Charente
- Arrondissement: Confolens
- Canton: Boixe-et-Manslois
- Commune: Aunac-sur-Charente
- Area^{1}: 4.22 km^{2} (1.63 sq mi)
- Elevation: 46 m (151 ft)
- Highest elevation: 119 m (390 ft)
- Lowest elevation: 61 m (200 ft)
- Population (2022): 104
  - Density: 24.6/km^{2} (63.8/sq mi)
- Time zone: UTC+01:00 (CET)
  - Summer (DST): UTC+02:00 (CEST)
- Postal code: 16460
- ^{1} French Land Register data, which excludes lakes, ponds, glaciers > 1 km^{2} (0.386 sq mi or 247 acres) and river estuaries.

Moutonneau (French pronunciation: [mutɔno]) is a former commune in the Charente department in southwestern France. On 1 January 2025, it was merged into the commune of Aunac-sur-Charente.

== Population ==
Historical population
Year	Pop.	±% p.a.
1968	108	—
1975	133	+3.02%
1982	116	−1.93%
1990	121	+0.53%
1999	123	+0.18%
2009	102	−1.85%
2014	103	+0.20%
2020	118	+2.29%
Source: INSEE

== See also ==
- Communes of the Charente department
