= Guy André Pierre de Montmorency-Laval =

- Duke of Laval; Marquis of Lezay; Baron of Marche
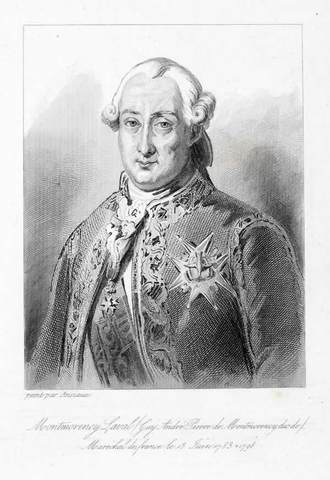
- Born: Guy-André-Pierre de Montmorency-Laval; 21 September 1723; Château de Bayers, Bayers, Kingdom of France
- Died: 22 September 1798 (aged 75); Paris
- Spouse: Jacqueline Hortense de Bullion de Fervaques (m. 1740; died 1795)
- House: House of Montmorency; House of Laval
- Father: Guy-André de Montmorency-Laval
- Mother: Marie Anne de Turmenies de Nointel

Guy-André-Pierre de Montmorency-Laval (21 September 1723 – 22 September 1798), 1st Duke of Laval, 1st Baron of Marche, Marquis of Lezay, was a French general and Marshal of France.

== Early life ==
Montmorency-Laval was born at the Château de Bayers in Bayers, Province of Angoumois, Kingdom of France, on 21 September 1723. He was the son of Guy-André de Montmorency-Laval, Marquis of Lezay and Magnac, and Marie Anne de Turmenies de Nointel. He was the brother of Louis-Joseph de Montmorency-Laval, Cardinal-Bishop of Metz, who was appointed Grand Chaplain of France in 1786 following the scandal of the Affair of the Diamond Necklace, but had to emigrate in 1791 and died in exile.

== Career ==
=== War of the Austrian Succession ===
Initially known under the title Marquis of Laval, he joined the musketeers during the War of the Austrian Succession on 1 January 1741, serving in the Flanders campaign in 1742. On 4 April 1743 he bought a commission to command the Régiment Royal Pologne Cavalerie. On 27 June 1743, he fought at the Battle of Dettingen. Two months later on 22 August 1743, he was commissioned as colonel of an infantry regiment that was renamed after him. In 1744, he was present at the capture of Wissembourg and of the Loutre lines, at the attack on the trenches at Soufflenheim and the Siege of Fribourg. He took part in the capture of Cronenbourg in March 1745. He joined the French army in Flanders, taking part in Grillon's regiment in what the French termed the Battle of Melle at Dendermonde near Ghent, in a victory against a British, Austrian and Dutch force. He became appointed brigadier on the 25th of the same month.

In 1746, he fought at the Battle of Rocourt and, in 1747, participated in the sieges of Ecluse, Ghent, Hulst, Axel and Berg-op-Zoom, at the Siege of Maastricht in 1748, and was made a Field Marshal in May 1748.

=== Seven Years' War ===
On the Mediterranean coast in 1756 during the Seven Years' War, he passed through the island of Minorca, which was conquered, and was used in the assault on Fort Saint-Philippe. In Germany, he fought at the Battle of Hastenbeck in 1757, helped conquer the electorate of Hanover, and returned after the Convention of Klosterzeven.

In 1758, he fought at the Battle of Krefeld. He was at the Battle of Minden on 1 August 1759, and was appointed Lieutenant-General of the Armies ("Lieutenant Général des armées") on 17 December 1759. He served in the Battle of Corbach in 1760, and at the Battle of Villinghausen in 1761. In the same year, he was given the government of Mont-Dauphin, then that of Compiègne, and finally made Marshal of France on 15 June 1783.

=== Peerage ===
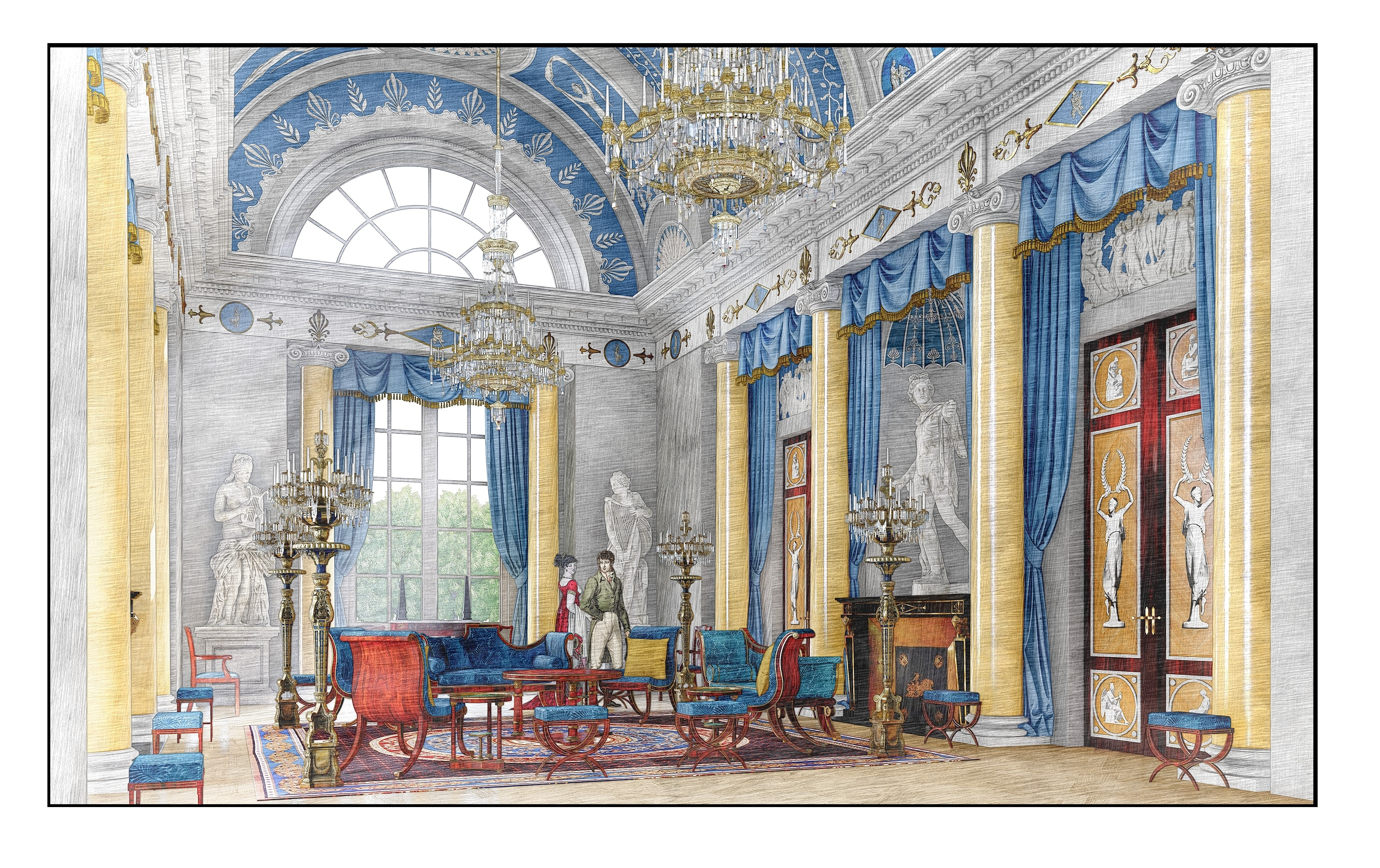
Concert hall of the Duke of Laval's hunting lodge in Paris, 1804.

Due to his services to the Crown, he was elevated to the dignity of Hereditary Duke, by letters of October 1758, which was registered on the following 29 November, bringing together the barony of Arnac and other neighboring lands to the marquisate of Magnac, which were combined into the duchy of Laval, for him and his male descendants, with extension to the children and male descendants of his relative, the late Joseph-Pierre, Count of Montmorency-Laval (of the House of Laval-Tartigny), who died at the Battle of Hastenbeck.

== Personal life ==
On 28 December 1740, he married Jacqueline Hortense de Bullion de Fervaques (d. 1795), daughter of Anne Jacques de Bullion, Marquis of Fervaques, Lieutenant General of the King's Armies, and Marie Madeleine Hortense de Gigault de Bellefonds. As the granddaughter of Charles-Denis de Bullion, Marquis of Gallardon, she was heiress to his lands at Fervaques and Esclimont, which passed into the House of Montmorency. Together, they were the parents of:

- Guy-André-Marie Joseph de Montmorency-Laval (1744–1761), styled Count of Laval, who died of smallpox; he married Anne-Céleste-Françoise Jacquier de Vieuxmaison, but died without issue.
- Anne-Alexandre-Marie-Sulpice-Joseph de Montmorency-Laval, 2nd Duke of Laval (1747–1817), who married Marie Louise Mauricette de Montmorency-Luxembourg, daughter of Count Joseph Maurice Annibal de Montmorency-Luxembourg, in 1764.
- Mathieu-Paul-Louis de Montmorency-Laval (1748–1809), Count of Montmorency who married Catherine Tavernier de Boullongne, in 1766. After her death, he married Anne-Françoise Le Joyant, in 1808.
- Louis Hilaire de Montmorency-Laval (1750–1770), called the Abbot of Laval.
- Guyonne-Hortense de Montmorency-Laval (b. 1751), who died young.
- Anne Sylvain de Montmorency-Laval (1752–1758), who died young.
- Guyonne-Joséphine-Elisabeth de Montmorency-Laval (1755–1830), who married Louis Joseph d'Albert de Luynes, 6th Duke of Luynes, in 1768. She brought the Château d'Esclimont to her marriage.

The Duchess died on 30 January 1795. The Duke died in Paris on 22 September 1798.

=== Descendants ===
Through his eldest surviving son Anne-Alexandre, he was a grandfather of Anne-Adrien-Pierre de Montmorency-Laval, 1st Duke of San Fernando Luis, 3rd Duke of Laval (1768–1837), King Charles X's Ambassador of France to the United Kingdom from 1828 to 1830.

Through his younger son Mathieu, he was a grandfather of Mathieu de Montmorency, 1st Duke of Montmorency-Laval (1767–1826); Anne-Pierre de Montmorency-Laval (1769–1794), who was condemned by the Revolutionary Tribunal; and Anne-Louise-Philippine-Françoise de Montmorency-Laval (1791–1852), who married Count Claude-Albert-Casimir de Colombet de Landos in 1815 and, after his death in 1823, Baron Alphonse-Ezechiel Lallemand de Driésen in 1828.

French nobility
Preceded by Guy André de Montmorency-Laval	Marquis of Lezay; 1745–1798	Succeeded by Anne-Alexandre-Marie de Montmorency-Laval
Preceded by New creation	Duke of Laval; 1758–1798	Succeeded by Anne-Alexandre-Marie de Montmorency-Laval
