= Aunac =

Commune in Charente, France

- Part of Aunac-sur-Charente
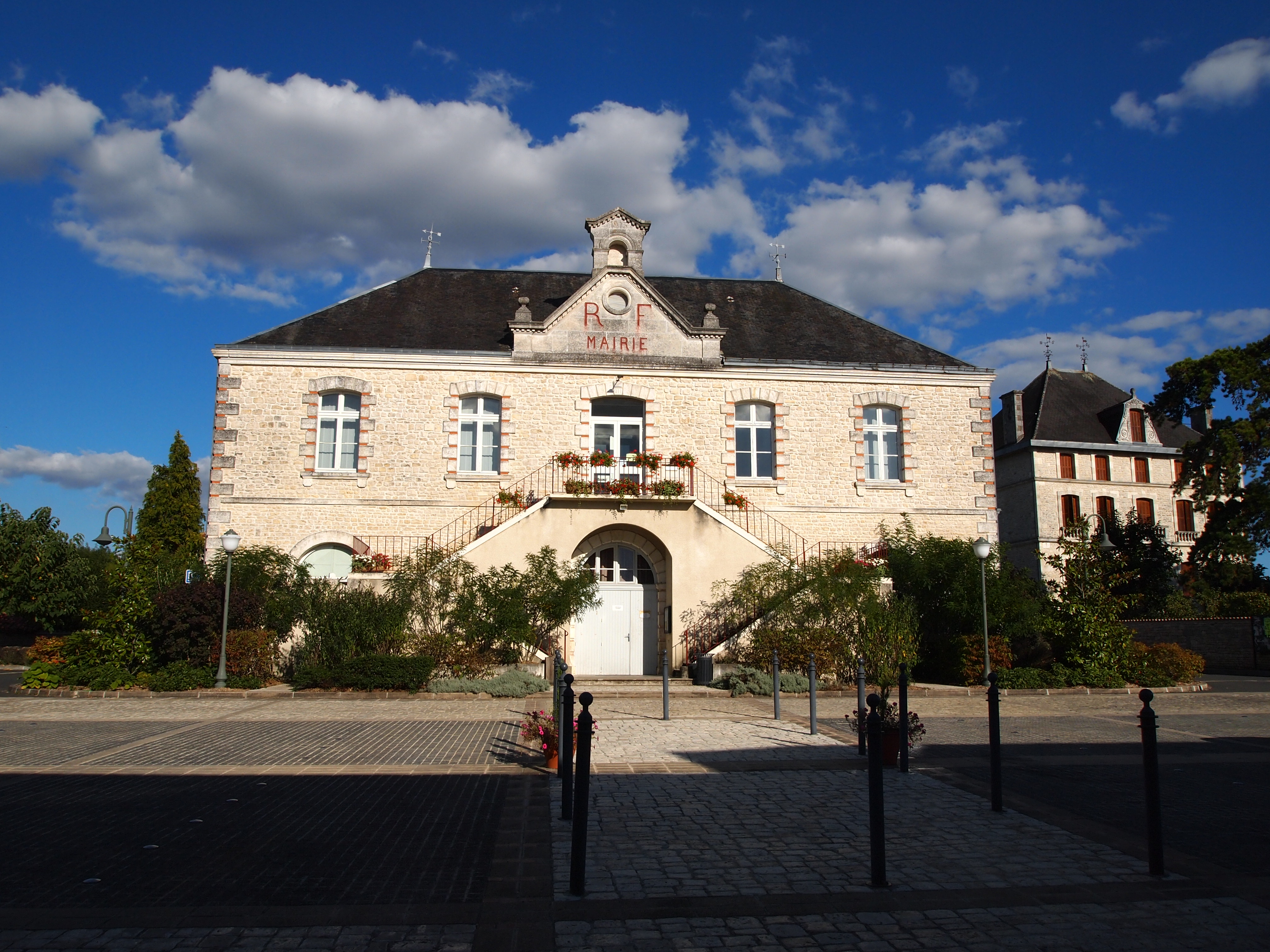
- Town hall
- Location of Aunac
- Location within France Location within Nouvelle-Aquitaine
- Coordinates: 45°55′07″N 0°14′31″E
- Country: France
- Region: Nouvelle-Aquitaine
- Department: Charente
- Arrondissement: Confolens
- Canton: Boixe-et-Manslois
- Commune: Aunac-sur-Charente
- Area^{1}: 4.77 km^{2} (1.84 sq mi)
- Elevation: 94 m (308 ft)
- Highest elevation: 104 m (341 ft)
- Lowest elevation: 64 m (210 ft)
- Population (2017): 339
  - Density: 71.1/km^{2} (184/sq mi)
- Time zone: UTC+01:00 (CET)
  - Summer (DST): UTC+02:00 (CEST)
- Postal code: 16460
- ^{1} French Land Register data, which excludes lakes, ponds, glaciers > 1 km^{2} (0.386 sq mi or 247 acres) and river estuaries.

Aunac (French pronunciation: [onak]) is a former commune in the Charente department in southwestern France. On 1 January 2017, it was merged into the new commune Aunac-sur-Charente.

== Population ==
Historical population

Year	Pop.	±% p.a.
1793	348	—
1821	313	−0.38%
1846	506	+1.94%
1872	502	−0.03%
1901	431	−0.52%
1926	352	−0.81%
1946	337	−0.22%

Year	Pop.	±% p.a.
1962	340	+0.06%
1968	318	−1.11%
1975	317	−0.04%
1982	327	+0.44%
1990	292	−1.41%
1999	297	+0.19%
2017	339	+0.74%

Source: EHESS and INSEE (2017)

== See also ==
- Communes of the Charente department
