= Chenommet =

Former commune in Nouvelle-Aquitaine, France

- Part of Aunac-sur-Charente
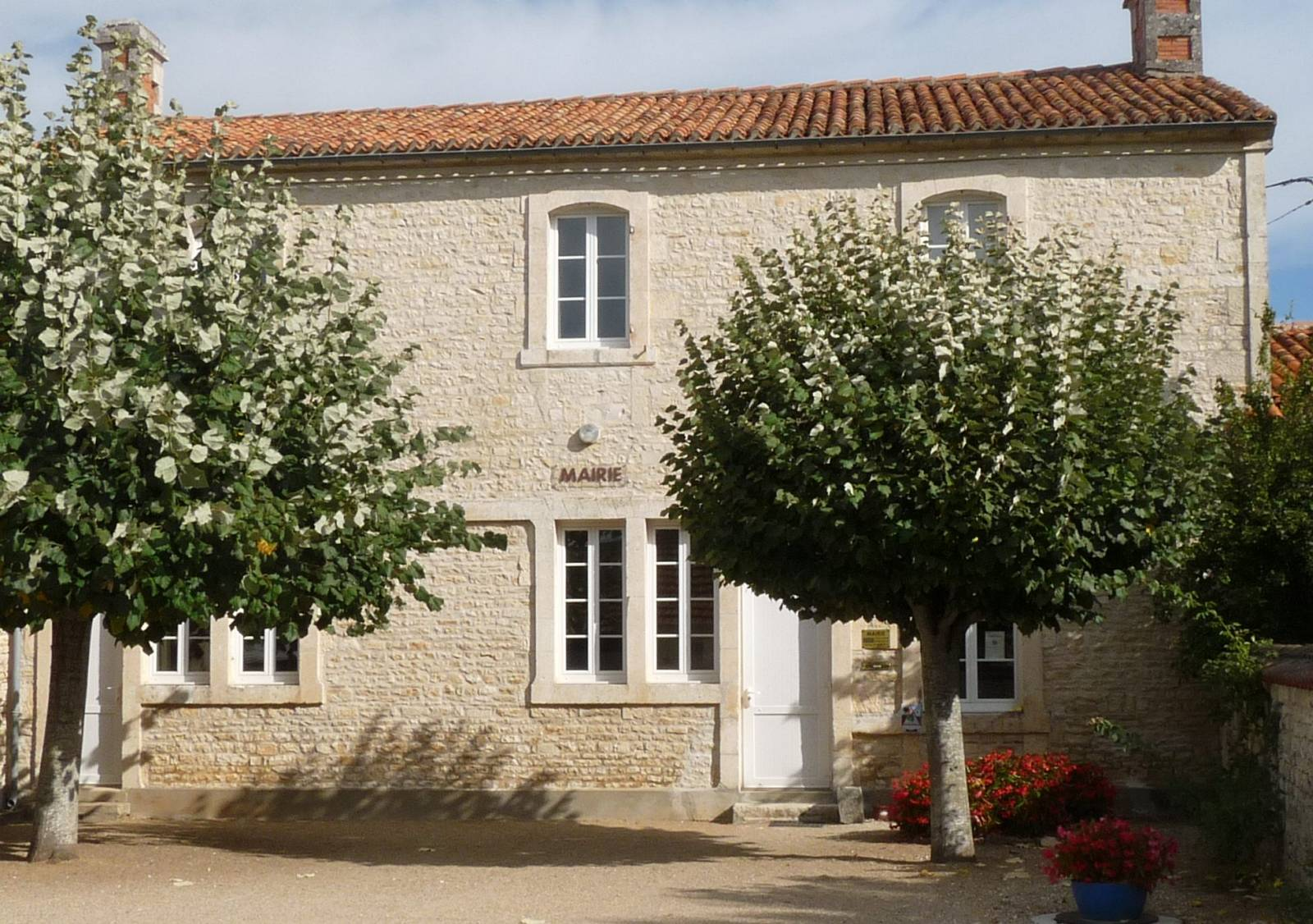
- Town hall
- Location of Chenommet
- Location within France Location within Nouvelle-Aquitaine
- Coordinates: 45°56′15″N 0°14′44″E
- Country: France
- Region: Nouvelle-Aquitaine
- Department: Charente
- Arrondissement: Confolens
- Canton: Boixe-et-Manslois
- Commune: Aunac-sur-Charente
- Area^{1}: 4.43 km^{2} (1.71 sq mi)
- Elevation: 120 m (390 ft)
- Highest elevation: 117 m (384 ft)
- Lowest elevation: 69 m (226 ft)
- Population (2017): 165
  - Density: 37.2/km^{2} (96.5/sq mi)
- Time zone: UTC+01:00 (CET)
  - Summer (DST): UTC+02:00 (CEST)
- Postal code: 16460
- ^{1} French Land Register data, which excludes lakes, ponds, glaciers > 1 km^{2} (0.386 sq mi or 247 acres) and river estuaries.

Chenommet (French pronunciation: [ʃənɔmɛ]) is a former commune in the Charente department in southwestern France. On 1 January 2017, it was merged into the new commune Aunac-sur-Charente.

== Population ==
Historical population

Year	Pop.	±% p.a.
1793	380	—
1821	379	−0.01%
1846	420	+0.41%
1872	437	+0.15%
1901	293	−1.37%
1926	210	−1.32%
1946	207	−0.07%

Year	Pop.	±% p.a.
1962	191	−0.50%
1968	182	−0.80%
1975	160	−1.82%
1982	148	−1.11%
1990	146	−0.17%
1999	128	−1.45%
2017	165	+1.42%

Source: EHESS and INSEE (2017)

== See also ==
- Communes of the Charente department
