= Château de Beaumesnil =

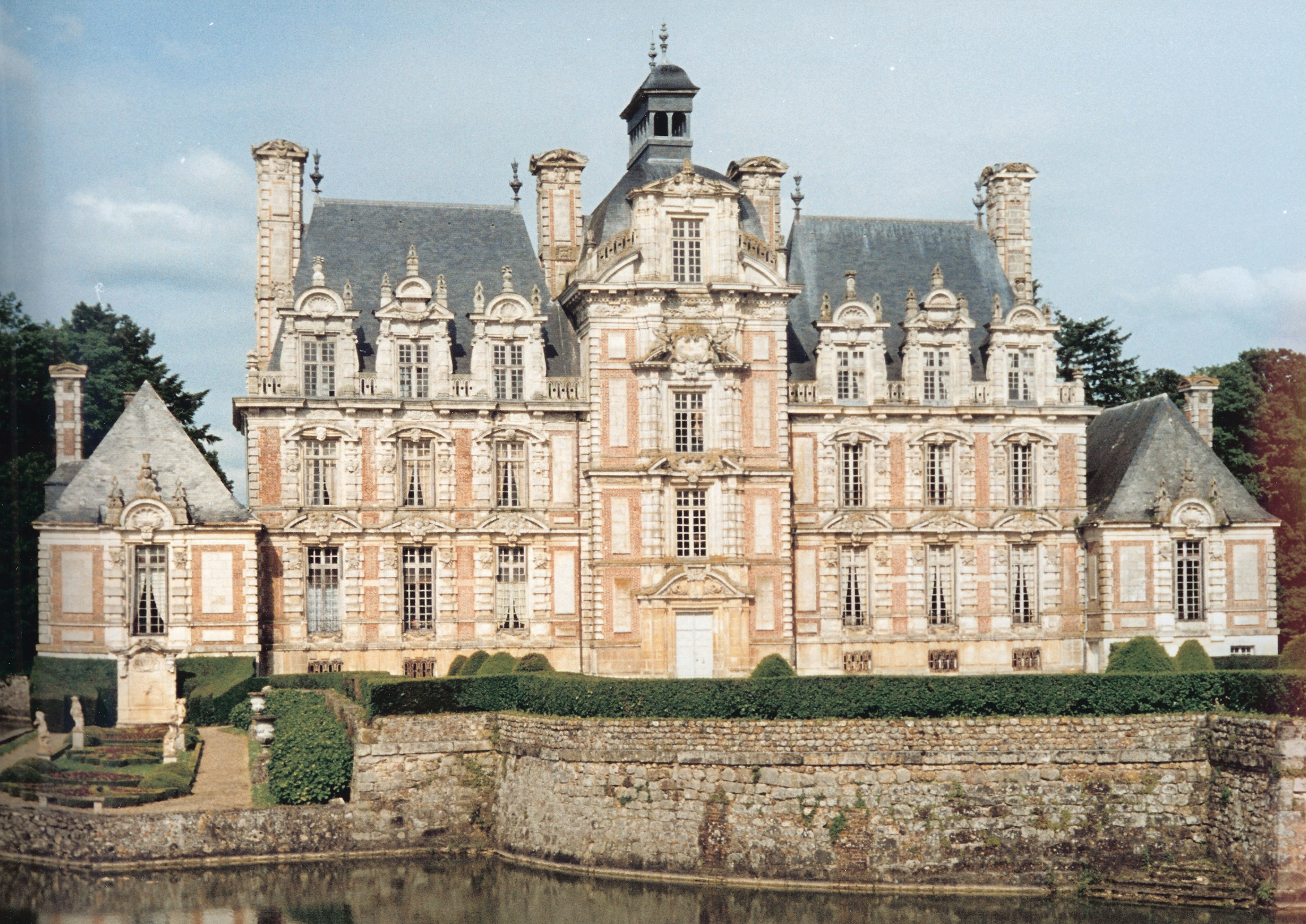
- Western façade of the château
- Interactive map of the Château de Beaumesnil area

General information
- Type: Château
- Architectural style: Baroque
- Location: Beaumesnil, Eure, France
- Coordinates: 49°0′50″N 0°42′41″E
- Construction started: 1633
- Completed: 1640
- Owner: Fondation Fürstenberg-Beaumesnil

Design and construction
- Architect: Jean Gallard

Website
- http://www.chateaubeaumesnil.com/en

Château de Beaumesnil is a 17th-century Louis XIII baroque style château located in the commune of and close to the village of Beaumesnil in Eure department of Normandy in northern France. The château, now an official historical monument of France, is surrounded by a moat, having been built on the site of a medieval castle of the same name.

== Description ==
The château, which is an official historical monument of France, is located on a 60 hectare estate to the north-east of the village of Beaumesnil, 140 km west of Paris and midway between the towns of Lisieux and Évreux. A large proportion of the estate is woodland, but in traditional French formal style an east–west axis contains the château, its forecourt and moat at the western end while the central and eastern part of the axis are laid to grass.

=== Château ===
The château, one of France's smaller châteaus, designed and built by John Gallard during the reign of Louis XIII between 1633 and 1640, is constructed of stone and brick walls with a slate roof on the ruins of the motte-and-bailey castle that had stood on the site since medieval times. The east and west facades are heavily decorated with carvings — windows have grotesque masks inspired by the Commedia dell'arte, intertwined letters "M" and "D" allude to Marie Dauvet Des Marets, wife of Jacques, Marquis of Nonant and daughter Nicolas Brûlart de Sillery, Chancellor of France while the shields of the Montmorency-Laval branch of the Laval family appear above the main doorways.

The north and south pavilions were added to the building during the eighteenth century. The donjon (keep) that was built on a mound to the south of the site was converted into an icehouse. The mound is now covered with a boxwood maze. The château and forecourt were built on the bailey with the forecourt. A footbridge provides access to the château from the east and a vehicular bridge provides access to the forecourt and château from the west. Another footbridge connects the forecourt with the motte.

The eastern side of the château overlooks a parterre laid to lawn with woodland on either side. In the 18th century, wings were added to both the northern and southern ends of the château. The "state" rooms — the library, the drawing room, the dining room, the mistress' apartment are on the first floor and are accessed using the grand staircase.

=== Gardens ===
The château, which is nicknamed "Norman Versailles", is located in a 60-hectare estate landscaped by La Quintinie, a student of André Le Nôtre, though little is left of la Quintinie's original gardens. Much of the estate to the east of the château is wooded with a parterre laid to lawn, almost a kilometre in length, providing an impressive perspectives from the château's state rooms. The parterre is broken by a large pond, approximately one hectare in the area, which has many features of a formal pond such as regular edging with specific geometric shapes.

Two formal flower beds were laid out in the 18th century to the east of the château, the smaller Jardin des quatre saisons (Four Seasons garden) on the northern side of the forecourt and the larger semicircular Jardins demi-lune (Halfmoon garden) on the northern bank of the moat.

As part of a conservation plan, a kitchen garden with over 500 varieties of ancient vegetables, including unusual varieties like the devil's ear lettuce and rainbow corn has been cultivated.

=== The library ===
The château's library and 16th-century bookbinding museum were built up by the German-Jewish financier Hans Fürstenberg (1890 - 1982), (Note: He changed his name to Jean Furstenberg when he moved to France. See B. H. Breslauer, ‘Jean Furstenberg, 1890–1982: Portrait of a Bibliophile’, The Book Collector, 31 no. 4 (1982), pp. 427–44, at p. 427.) son of Carl who had fled Nazi Germany in 1937. He bought the château in 1938 and moved its collection of 16,000 books there, many of which dated from the seventeenth or eighteenth century. As the invasion of France drew near, valuable archives of the Bibliothèque nationale, the private archives of the King of the Belgians, the archives of Rouen and the Archives de France were moved to the château's library for safekeeping. Part of the collection was sent to Vichy France for safekeeping and the rest confiscated by the Nazi invaders. Fürstenberg's own collection ended up at the Schloss Tanzenberg in Kärnten, Austria. During the war, part of Fürstenberg's collection was lost, but the rest was returned to the château. After the war Fürstenberg rebuilt his collection, but in his later years sold parts of it to various institutes. Shortly after Fürstenberg's death, the library was further depleted when a number of items were sold to fund the Fondation Fürstenberg-Beaumesnil.

== History ==
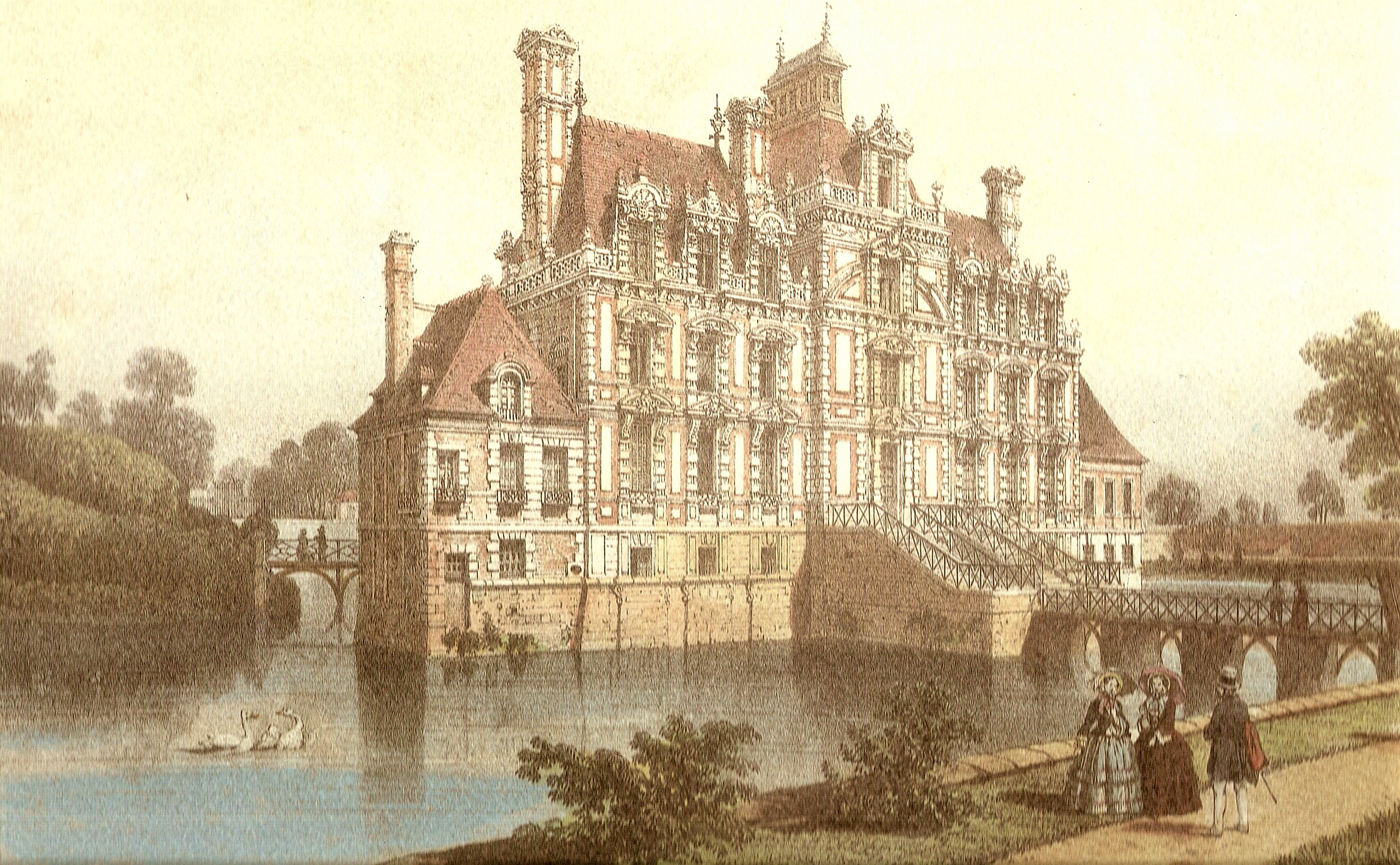
Eastern facade of the Château de Beaumesnil, taken from a drawing dated 1820

Beaumesnil was first mentioned in the Treaty of Saint-Clair-sur-Epte in 911 (the setting up of the Duchy of Normandy as part of the lands of the Counts of Meulan. In 1066 Roger de Beaumont, son-in-law to Waleran III, Comte de Meulan, provided William the Conqueror with 60 ships. In 1250 Robert de Harcourt was given permission to build a stone donjon (keep) on the motte. This was later extended to incorporate a bailey, both of which were on islands.

During the Hundred Years' War, the castle fell to the English in 1415 and in 1418 was given to Robert Willoughby by Henry V. Beaumesnil was retaken by the French in 1441. In 1449 the castle, was restored to Jean II Tournebu who, in 1463, sold the property to Jean de Lorraine, Count of Harcourt.

In 1634 it was recorded that the castle had eight towers and a dwelling house with parlour, bedroom and kitchen, but little else was known of its structure. In that year Jacque Nonant, started the construction of the château on the site of the castle, the work being completed in 1641. The château passed through a number of hands and on the eve of the French Revolution was owned by Armand Joseph de Bethune, Duke of Chârost who was the first French nobleman to renounce his feudal rights. Nevertheless, the revolutionary army ransacked the château and guillotined Bethune-Charlost's son and heir.

Bethune-Charlost died in 1800 and his widow recovered the property and married Eugène-Alexandre de Montmorency-Laval. Montgmorency-Laval set about a program of restoration including the building of a chapel in 18xx as a thanksgiving for the restoration of the Bourbon monarchy. Successive owners continued the restoration work and when the last owner Hans Fursetnberg died in 1982, his estate was used to set up the Fondation Fürstenberg-Beaumesnil.

== Owners ==
In 1927, de Maistre sold the chateau to the American company Domaine of Beaumesnil, Inc., whose controlling director was Grand Duke Dimitri Pavlovich, member of the House of Romanov and first cousin of Tsar Nicholas II. In 1938 Dimitri sold the chateau to the Jewish financier and bibliophile Hans Furstenburg, a refugee from Nazi Germany. Furstenburg died in 1982 and bequeathed the chateau to a foundation that was entrusted to conserve the property and his library.
