= Louis-Joseph de Montmorency-Laval =

French cardinal and bishop

His Eminence Louis-Joseph de Montmorency-Laval
- Cardinal Bishop Emeritus of Metz
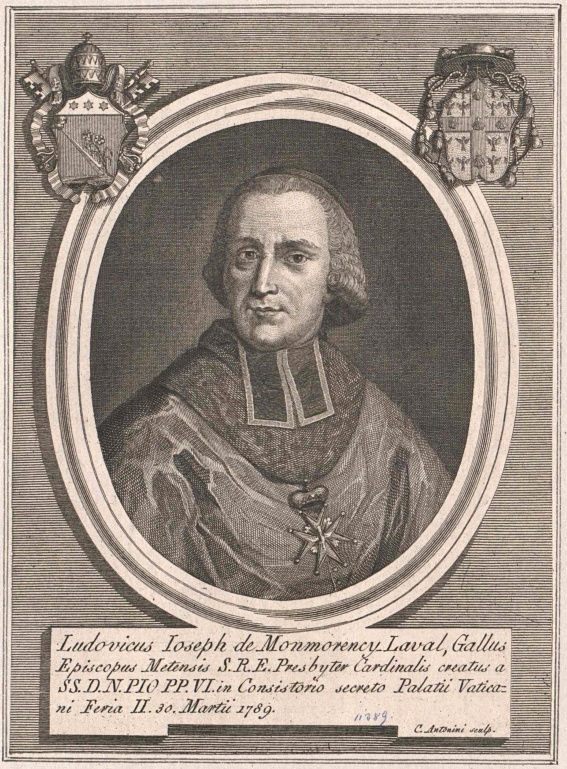
- Province: Holy See
- See: Roman Catholic Diocese of Metz
- Installed: 21 August 1760
- Term ended: 1801
- Predecessor: Bishop Claude de Rouvroy de Saint-Simon
- Successor: Bishop Pierre-François Bienaymé
- Other posts: Bishop of Orléans (1753–57), Bishop of Condom (1757-60)

Orders
- Consecration: 10 February 1754 by Archbishop Christophe de Beaumont du Repaire
- Created cardinal: 30 March 1789

Personal details
- Born: December 11, 1724 Bayers, Province of Angoumois, Kingdom of France
- Died: June 17, 1808 (aged 83) Altona, Kingdom of Denmark–Norway
- Denomination: Roman Catholic
- Coat of arms

Louis-Joseph de Montmorency-Laval (1724-1808) was a French cardinal of the Catholic Church and Bishop of Metz at the time of the French Revolution.

== Early life ==
He was born 11 December 1724 in the castle of Baillet in the town of Bayers, then in the ancient Province of Angoumois, now part of the Department of Charente. He was the son of Guy-André de Montmorency-Laval and of Marie-Anne de Turménies de Nointel, and younger brother of Guy André Pierre de Montmorency-Laval. The family name is sometimes rendered as Laval-Montmorency.

As a young man, Montmorency-Laval studied at the Sorbonne University in Paris, where he obtained a licentiate in canon law. The date of his reception of Holy Orders as a priest is lost. He was made Vicar General of the Archdiocese of Sens.

== Bishop and cardinal ==
Montmorency-Laval was nominated as the new Bishop of Orléans by King Louis XV on 7 November 1753. This was confirmed by the Holy See on 14 January 1754. He was consecrated a bishop on 10 February 1754, at the Cathedral of Notre-Dame, Paris, by Christophe de Beaumont du Repaire, Archbishop of Paris, assisted by Étienne-René Potier de Gesvres, Bishop of Beauvais, and Pierre-Jules-César de Rochechouard-Montigny, Bishop of Bayeux.

After service in that post for four years, Montmorency-Laval was named Bishop of Condom, where he remained for two years before being appointed Bishop of Metz in 1760, a post he occupied until 1801. He was also appointed in 1786 Grand Almoner of France, and on 30 March 1789 Pope Pius VI created him a cardinal.

== Exile and death ==
During the French Revolution Montmorency-Laval left France and lived in exile in the Kingdom of Denmark–Norway, settling in the town of Altona, now a part of Germany. He was unable to participate at the 1799–1800 Papal conclave, the only one for which he would have been eligible to vote.

Montmorency-Laval died in exile in Altona on 17 June 1808. His body was initially buried at the local church of St. Joseph of the "Greater Freedom" (German: Großer Freiheit). In 1900, the remains were removed and reburied in the crypt of the Cathedral of Metz.
