= Diocese of Metz =

Diocese of the Catholic Church

Coordinates: 49.1201°N 6.17591°E

Diocese of Metz Dioecesis Metensis Diocèse de Metz

Catholic
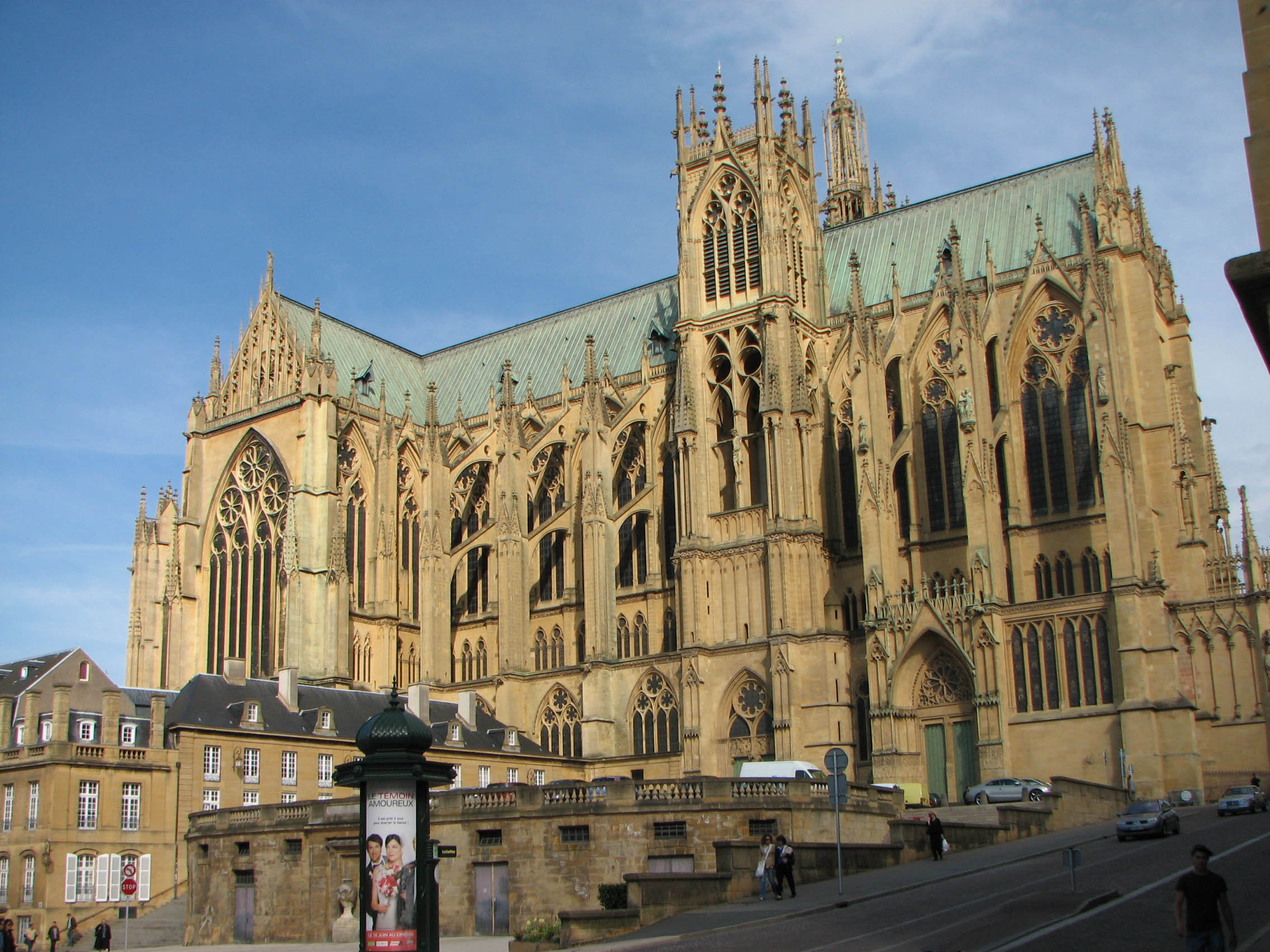
- Metz Cathedral

- Coat of arms

Location
- Country: France
- Metropolitan: Exempt directly to the Holy See

Statistics
- Area: 6,226 km^{2} (2,404 sq mi)
- Population: Total; Catholics: (as of 2021); 1,036,000; 805,250 (77.7%)
- Parishes: 649

Information
- Denomination: Catholic Church
- Sui iuris church: Latin Church
- Rite: Roman Rite
- Cathedral: Cathedral of St. Stephen in Metz
- Patron saint: Saint Stephen
- Secular priests: 242 (Diocesan); 33 (Religious Orders); 49 Permanent Deacons

Current leadership
- Pope: Leo XIV
- Bishop: Philippe Ballot
- Bishops emeritus: Jean-Christophe Lagleize

Map

Website
- https://metz.catholique.fr/

The Diocese of Metz (Latin: Dioecesis Metensis; French: Diocèse de Metz) is a Latin Church ecclesiastical territory or diocese of the Catholic Church in France. In the Middle Ages it was a prince-bishopric of the Holy Roman Empire, a de facto independent state ruled by the prince-bishop who had the ex officio title of count. It was annexed to France by King Henry II in 1552; this was recognized by the Holy Roman Empire in the Peace of Westphalia of 1648. It formed part of the province of the Three Bishoprics. Since 1801 the Metz diocese has been a public-law corporation of cult (French: établissement public du culte). The diocese is presently exempt directly to the Holy See.

== History ==
Metz was definitely a bishopric by 535, but may date from earlier than that. Metz's Basilica of Saint-Pierre-aux-Nonnains is built on the site of a Roman basilica which is a likely location for one of the earliest Christian congregations of France.

Originally the diocese was under the metropolitan of Trier. After the French Revolution, the last prince bishop, Cardinal Louis de Montmorency-Laval (1761-1802) fled and the old organization of the diocese was broken up. With the Concordat of 1801 the diocese was re-established covering the departments of Moselle, Ardennes, and Forêts, and was put under the Archdiocese of Besançon. In 1817 the parts of the diocese which became Prussian territory were transferred to the Diocese of Trier. In 1823 the Grand Duchy of Luxembourg became part of the Diocese of Namur. In 1871 the core areas of the diocese became part of Germany, and in 1874 Metz diocese, then reconfined to the borders of the new German Lorraine department became immediately subject to the Holy See. As of 1910 there were about 533,000 Catholics living in the diocese of Metz.

When the 1905 French law on the Separation of the Churches and the State was enacted, doing away with public-law religious corporations, this did not apply to the Metz diocese then being within Germany. After World War I it was returned to France, but the concordatory status has been preserved since as part of the Local law in Alsace-Moselle. In 1940, after the French defeat, it came under German occupation till 1944 when it became French again. Together with the Archdiocese of Strasbourg the bishop of the see is nominated by the French government according to the concordat of 1801. The concordat further provides for the clergy being paid by the government and Catholic pupils in public schools can receive religious instruction according to diocesan guide lines.

== See also ==
- Catholic Church in France
