= Beaumesnil, Eure =

Beaumesnil
- Part of Mesnil-en-Ouche
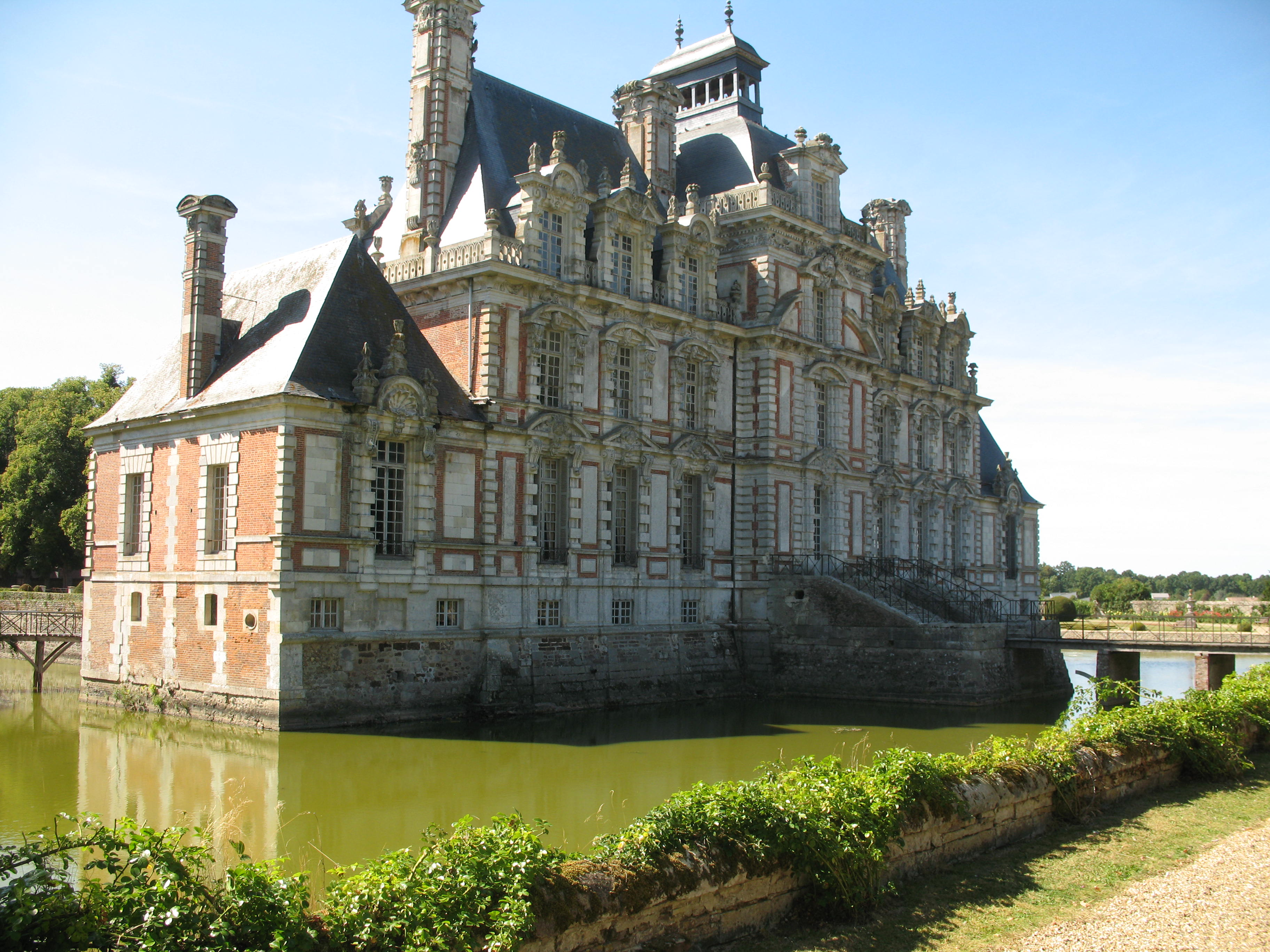

- Coat of arms
- Location of Beaumesnil
- Location within France Location within Normandy
- Coordinates: 49°00′47″N 0°42′22″E
- Country: France
- Region: Normandy
- Department: Eure
- Arrondissement: Bernay
- Canton: Bernay
- Commune: Mesnil-en-Ouche
- Area^{1}: 12.63 km^{2} (4.88 sq mi)
- Elevation: 169 m (554 ft)
- Highest elevation: 186 m (610 ft)
- Lowest elevation: 128 m (420 ft)
- Population (2023): 478
  - Density: 37.8/km^{2} (98.0/sq mi)
- Time zone: UTC+01:00 (CET)
  - Summer (DST): UTC+02:00 (CEST)
- Postal code: 27410
- ^{1} French Land Register data, which excludes lakes, ponds, glaciers > 1 km^{2} (0.386 sq mi or 247 acres) and river estuaries.

Beaumesnil (French pronunciation: [bomenil]) is a former commune in the Eure department in Normandy in northern France. On 1 January 2016, it was merged into the new commune of Mesnil-en-Ouche. The Château de Beaumesnil, a 17th-century Louis XIII baroque style château, is located to the north-east of the village.

== See also ==
- Communes of the Eure department
