= Aunac-sur-Charente =

- Commune
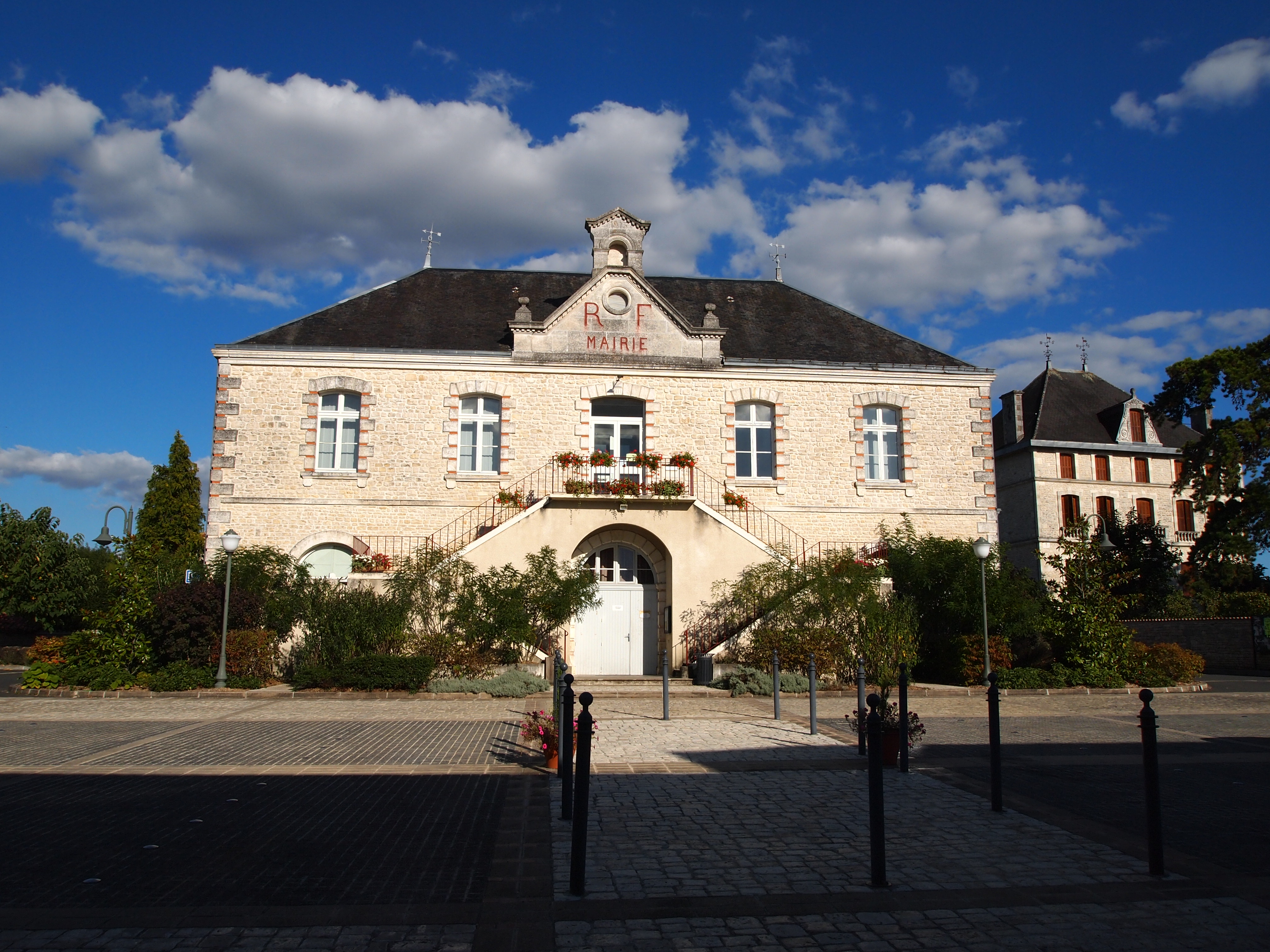
- The town hall in Aunac
- Location of Aunac-sur-Charente
- Location within France Location within Nouvelle-Aquitaine
- Coordinates: 45°55′08″N 0°14′31″E
- Country: France
- Region: Nouvelle-Aquitaine
- Department: Charente
- Arrondissement: Confolens
- Canton: Boixe-et-Manslois
- Intercommunality: CC Cœur de Charente

Government
  - Mayor (2025–2026): Didier Champaloux
- Area^{1}: 17.01 km^{2} (6.57 sq mi)
- Population (2023): 647
  - Density: 38.0/km^{2} (98.5/sq mi)
- Time zone: UTC+01:00 (CET)
  - Summer (DST): UTC+02:00 (CEST)
- INSEE/Postal code: 16023 /16460
- ^{1} French Land Register data, which excludes lakes, ponds, glaciers > 1 km^{2} (0.386 sq mi or 247 acres) and river estuaries.

Aunac-sur-Charente (French pronunciation: [onak syʁ ʃaʁɑ̃t], literally Aunac on Charente) is a commune in the department of Charente, southwestern France. The municipality was established on 1 January 2017 by merger of the former communes of Aunac (the seat), Bayers and Chenommet. On 1 January 2025, the former commune of Moutonneau was merged into Aunac-sur-Charente.

== See also ==
- Communes of the Charente department
