= Gabriel Nicolas Dauvet =

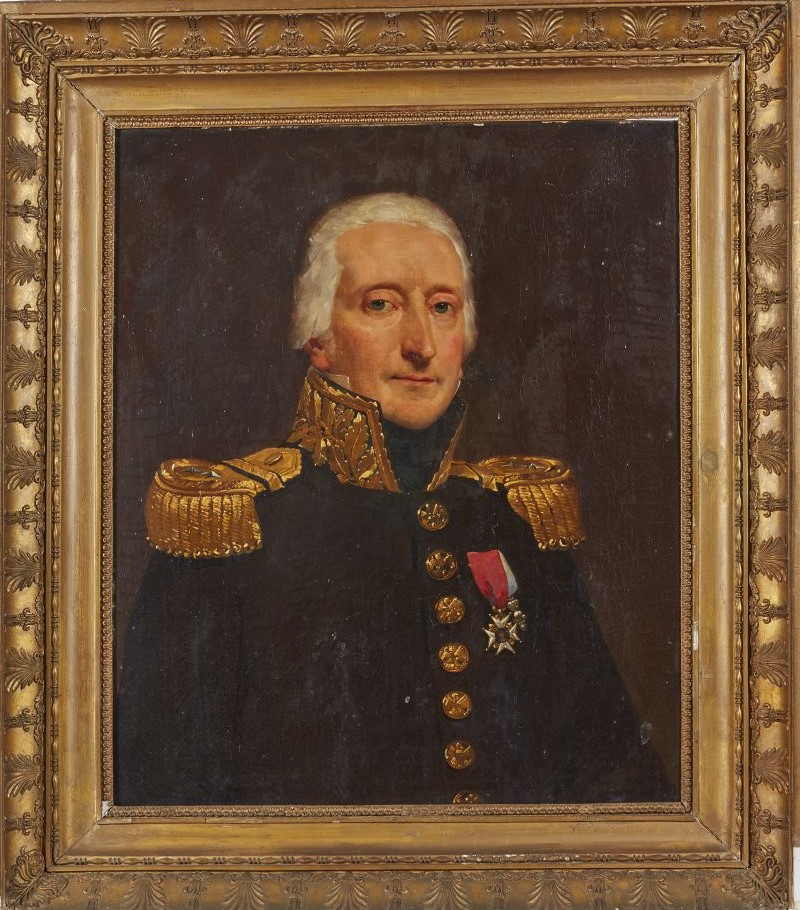
Portrait of the Marquis de Dauvet-Mainneville by Georges Rouget, 1815

Gabriel Nicolas Dauvet, Marquis de Dauvet-Maineville (16 September 1751 – 17 November 1819), was a French aristocrat and soldier.

== Early life ==
Dauvet was born on 16 September 1751 at the Château de Mainneville, a commune in the Eure department in Normandy in northern France. He was a son of Marshal Louis-Nicolas Dauvet de Mainneville (1717–1781) and his wife Marie-Angélique Groulard de Bogeffroy (1712–1790), a daughter of Guillaume Groulard, Marquis de Bogeffroy.

== Career ==
After the start of the French Revolution, he emigrated away from France for which he was sentenced to death in absentia on 15 July 1793 at the main court of the Seine-Maritime department. At the first Bourbon Restoration, he returned to his native country and received the rank of Maréchal de camp.

He was made a Chevalier of the Order of Saint Louis and awarded the Decoration of the Lily. In 1815, his portrait was painted by Georges Rouget.

== Personal life ==
In 1801 he married Marie-Françoise Vachon de Belmont-Briançon. Together, they were the parents of:

- Marie Françoise Dauvet de Mainneville (1802–1824), who married Honoré Théodoric d'Albert de Luynes, 8th Duke of Luynes, in 1822.
- Louis-Nicolas Dauvet de Mainneville (1807–1864).

Dauvet died on 17 November 1819 in Mainneville at the age of 68.

=== Descendants ===
Through his daughter Marie, he was a grandfather of Honoré-Louis d'Albert de Luynes, Duke of Chevreuse (1823–1854), who married Julie Valentine de Contades (1824–1900), a daughter of Jules Gaspard Amour de Contades (son of François-Jules de Contades) and Gabrielle Adèle Alexandrine Amys du Ponceau.
