= Guy-André de Montmorency-Laval =

French nobleman

Guy-André de Montmorency-Laval (21 October 1686 – 7 March 1745), Marquis of Lezay and Magnac, Baron of La Marche, was a French aristocrat.

== Early life ==
Guy-André was born on 21 October 1686. Like all the elders of the Laval and Montmorency family, his baptismal name was Guy, and he was referred to as a "Count of Laval" before any other title. He was the son of Pierre III de Laval-Montmorency (c. 1657–1687), (Note: Pierre III de Laval-Montmorency (c. 1657–1687), Marquis of Laval-Lezay, Marquis of Magnac, Count of La Bigeotière, Count of Fontaine-Chalendray, Lord of La Plessé, premier Baron de La Marche, served as Lieutenant-General for the King in Upper and Lower La Marche.) and Marie Thérèse Françoise de Salignac (d. 1726), Marquise of Magnac, Countess of Fontaines-Chalandray.

His paternal grandparents were Guy-Urbain de Laval-Montmorency, Baron of la Plesse, known as the Marquis de Laval-Lezay, and Françoise de Sesmaisons. His maternal grandparents were Antoine de Salignac, Marquis of Magnac and Lamothe-Fénelon, and Catherine de Montbéron.

== Career ==
Montmorency was First Colonel of the Mortemart regiment, formerly Conflans. He was injured by a musket shot on 15 October 1715, at the siége of Fribourg. In all the letters and commissions he received from the King, he regarded him as a cousin.

=== Cellamare conspiracy ===
Montmorency was involved in the Cellamare conspiracy, the plot against the Regent of France, Philippe d'Orléans that aimed to depose him of his position and place Philip V, then King of Spain, as the new regent of France. His role in the plot was referenced in the memoirs of Baroness de Staal, the correspondences of Madame la Duchesse d'Orléans, the memoirs of Marshal Claude de Villars and the memoirs of the Duke of Saint-Simon. Also involved was the Duke of Richelieu, who was then having a romantic affair with one of the Regent's daughters, Charlotte Aglaé d'Orléans. After the plot was uncovered, Montmorency was interrogated at the Bastille and imprisoned at the Fortress of Vincennes. By 1720, however, the guilty members were all pardoned and allowed to return to their residences.

== Personal life ==
In 1722 Montmorency married Marie-Anne de Turménies de Nointel (1684–1756), the widow of Mathieu de La Rochefoucauld, Marquis of Bayers. (Note: From her marriage to Mathieu de La Rochefoucauld, Marquis of Bayers (1660–1721), she was mother to (i) Marie Louise Françoise de La Rochefoucauld (1713–1791) — wife of Count Léopold Gabriel Christophe François Le Prud'homme (1700–1767), de Fontenoy and Count Christophe François Louis Le Prud'homme, de Fontenoy — and (ii) Mathieu-Roch de La Rochefoucauld (1714–1749), Marquis of Bayers.) She was the daughter of (a) Jean de Turménies (aka Turményes) (c. 1640–1702), Lord of Nointel and Presle, and (b) Marie Anne Le Bel (1642–1695). Their children were:

- Guy André Pierre de Montmorency-Laval (1723–1798), created 1st Duke of Laval in 1758; he married Jacqueline Hortense de Bullion de Fervaques in 1740.
- Louis-Joseph de Montmorency-Laval (1724–1808), the Bishop of Condom, Metz and Orléans who was made a Cardinal by Pope Pius VI in 1789.
- Guyonne-Marie-Christine de Montmorency-Laval, who married Henri-François de Grave, Marquis of Grave, in 1740.
- Marie-Anne de Montmorency-Laval (1725–c. 1780), who married the Belgian Duke Hyacinthe-François de Looz-Corswarem.

He died in Paris on 7 March 1745. His widow died on 17 November 1766.

== Notes ==
French nobility
Preceded by Pierre III de Laval-Montmorency	Marquis of Lezay; 1687–1745	Succeeded by Guy-André-Pierre de Montmorency-Laval
