= Duke of San Fernando Luis =

Dukedom of Spain

Dukedom of San Fernando Luis
- Creation date: 7 February 1816
- Created by: Ferdinand VII
- Peerage: Peerage of Spain
- First holder: Anne-Adrien-Pierre de Montmorency-Laval, 1st Duke of San Fernando Luis
- Present holder: Antoine de Lévis-Mirepoix, 7th Duke of San Fernando Luis

Duke of San Fernando Luis (Spanish: Duque de San Fernando Luis) is a hereditary title in the Peerage of Spain, accompanied by the dignity of Grandee and granted in 1816 by Ferdinand VII to Anne-Adrien-Pierre de Montmorency-Laval, for his efforts as Ambassador in Spain during the Bourbon Restoration.

== Dukes of San Fernando Luis ==
1. Anne-Adrien-Pierre de Montmorency-Laval, 1st Duke of San Fernando Luis
2. Charlotte-Adélaïde de Montmorency-Laval, 2nd Duchess of Fernando Luis
3. Guy de Lévis-Mirepoix, 3rd Duke of San Fernando Luis
4. Henri de Lévis-Mirepoix, 4th Duke of San Fernando Luis
5. Antoine de Lévis-Mirepoix, 5th Duke of San Fernando Luis
6. Charles-Henri de Lévis-Mirepoix, 6th Duke of San Fernando Luis
7. Antoine de Lévis-Mirepoix, 7th Duke of San Fernando Luis

== See also ==
- List of dukes in the peerage of Spain
- List of current grandees of Spain

== Bibliography ==
- Hidalgos de España, Real Asociación de (2018). Elenco de Grandezas y Títulos Nobiliarios Españoles. Ediciones Hidalguía. ISBN 978-84-94841-02-6.
