= Anne-Adrien-Pierre de Montmorency-Laval =

French noble (1768–1837)

The Most Excellent The Duke of San Fernando Luis GE
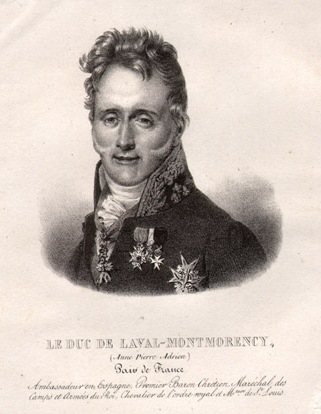
- Litography, 1835

Ambassador of France to the United Kingdom
- In office 1828–1830
- Monarch: Charles X
- Preceded by: Jules de Polignac
- Succeeded by: Charles Maurice de Talleyrand-Périgord

Personal details
- Born: 29 October 1768 Paris
- Died: 16 June 1837 (aged 68) Paris
- Occupation: Parliamentarian, diplomat, soldier
- Known for: Foreign minister, Ambassador of France

Anne-Adrien-Pierre de Montmorency, 1st Duke of San Fernando Luis, 3rd Duke of Laval-Montmorency, GE (29 October 1768, in Paris – 16 June 1837, in Paris), was a peer of France and of Spain.

He was an heir of the noble families of Montmorency and of Laval, styled Marquis de Laval then Prince de Montmorency-Laval before succeeding to his father's titles in 1817. He was additionally created a grandee of Spain and Duke of San Fernando Luis.

Adrien de Montmorency-Laval was a French army officer, before serving as French foreign minister and as an ambassador during the Bourbon Restoration.

== Early years ==
His father was Lieutenant-General Anne-Alexandre de Montmorency, 2nd Duc de Laval, and his mother was Marie-Louise de Montmorency-Luxembourg (1750–1829).

Born in 1768 while his formidable great-grandfather, Marshal Guy-André-Pierre de Montmorency, the 1st duke was alive, Adrien was sent to be raised under the tuition of his uncle Cardinal Louis-Joseph de Montmorency-Laval, Prince-Bishop of Metz and Grand Almoner of France in preparation for taking holy orders.

Shortly after starting at the seminary of the Saint-Sulpice in Paris, his elder brother Guy de Montmorency, marquis de Laval, died unexpectedly in 1786; he had married Pauline-Renée-Sophie de Voyer de Paulmy d'Argenson in 1784. His brother's death, prompted him to leave church training and participate in court life at Versailles.

Montmorency-Laval joined the French army, being commissioned in the Alsace Cavalry Regiment, commanded by Charles, vicomte de Noailles (later duc de Mouchy) where he served alongside Marc-René de Voyer de Paulmy, marquis d'Argenson (1771–1842), his brother-in-law and lifelong friend.

Montmorency-Laval family arms

== Marriage and children ==
On 14 May 1788, he married his second cousin (their great-grandfather was Anne-Jacques de Bullion, marquis de Fervacques, Governor of Marne), Bonne-Charlotte-Renée-Adélaïde de Montmorency-Luxembourg (1773–1840), daughter of Anne-Charles-Sigismond, duc de Piney-Luxembourg (1737–1803) and head of the senior branch of the Montmorencys, by his wife Madeleine-Suzanne-Adélaïde de Voyer de Paulmy d'Argenson.

The Duke and his wife had three children:

- Guy-Anne-Marie-Louis-Henri-Adalric, prince de Laval (1796–1819), Huntmaster of Morbihan;
- Charlotte-Adélaïde (1798–1872), 2nd Duchess of San Fernando Luis, who married in 1817, Gustave de Lévis, marquis de Mirepoix: descendants include the historian, Antoine de Lévis-Mirepoix;
- Marguerite-Emmanuelle-Pauline (1811–1861) married Aimé, marquis de Couronnel: ancestors of the Rarécourt family.

Through his wife's family (the Colignys) their descendants inherited great wealth, as both her elder brothers died childless and in 1791 her younger sister Marie-Madeleine married Miguel Caetano Álvares Pereira de Melo, 5th Duque de Cadaval, emigrating to Portugal.

== Diplomatic career ==
Upon the outbreak of the French Revolution, after locating remaining family members in Paris, Adrien de Laval fled to England. As a French émigré in London, the marquis became friendly with the Prince of Wales and his circle.

During the revolutionary wars his father appointed him as aide-de-camp and despatched him to Italy as a captain in the Montmorency Regiment being stationed at Rome. After the ban on émigrés was lifted in 1800 he returned to France. Adrien de Laval was one of the first to congratulate Louis XVIII at Calais in 1814, and the king promoted him maréchal de camp (major-general) and bestowed on him the style of Prince de Montmorency-Laval; he succeeded to his father's dukedom in 1817.

On 15 August 1814, he was appointed French ambassador to Spain. There he came into conflict with Pedro Cevallos. But on receiving news of the return of Napoleon from Elba, a reconciliation was effected and Montmorency-Laval agreed to stay in Madrid, contrary to instructions from the French government. He successfully managed the somewhat tense relations between the Spanish Borbóns and the newly restored French Bourbons, being honoured in 1815 as a knight of the Golden Fleece and made Duke of San Fernando Luis with the rank of grandee. His next ambassadorial posting was to Rome, where he arrived just before the end of Pius VII's reign and was present during the conclave for the election of his successor as pope; he supported the efforts of Austria in favour of Cardinal Castiglioni's candidacy. However, Cardinal Annibale della Genga was elected as Leo XII.

On 20 March 1828, the Duc de Laval was appointed French ambassador to Austria. His name was also mooted as a candidate to be king of Greece, but he twice refused King Charles X's proposals.

He was then posted as Ambassador to the Court of St James's, returning to Paris just before Charles X's exile. At Talleyrand's request, he dealt with unpleasant issues in London caused by his relatives, Louis, duc de Valençay and his father Edmond, duca di Dino, who had become addicted to gambling.

Declining to swear allegiance to King Louis-Philippe, the Duke and Duchess retired to the chateau de Montigny, where they received visitors, including Talleyrand. The Duke died on 16 June 1837 and, having been predeceased by his son at Naples in 1819, his youngest brother Eugène succeeded to his French titles before they became extinct, whereas his Spanish ducado and grandeza devolved upon his elder daughter and her descendants.

== Honours and titles ==
Collar of the Saint-Esprit

- Duke of France
- Grandee of Spain
- Count of the Holy Roman Empire
- Grand Cross, Legion of Honour
- Knight, Order of the Holy Spirit
- Grand Cross, Order of Saint Louis
- Knight, Order of Malta
- Knight, Order of the Golden Fleece

== See also ==
- The Red and the Black
- Peerage of France
- List of Ambassadors of France to the United Kingdom

Political offices
Preceded by Auguste, comte de La Ferronays	Minister of Foreign Affairs; 24 April 1829 - 14 May 1829	Succeeded by Joseph-Marie, comte Portalis
