= Bayers =

- Part of Aunac-sur-Charente
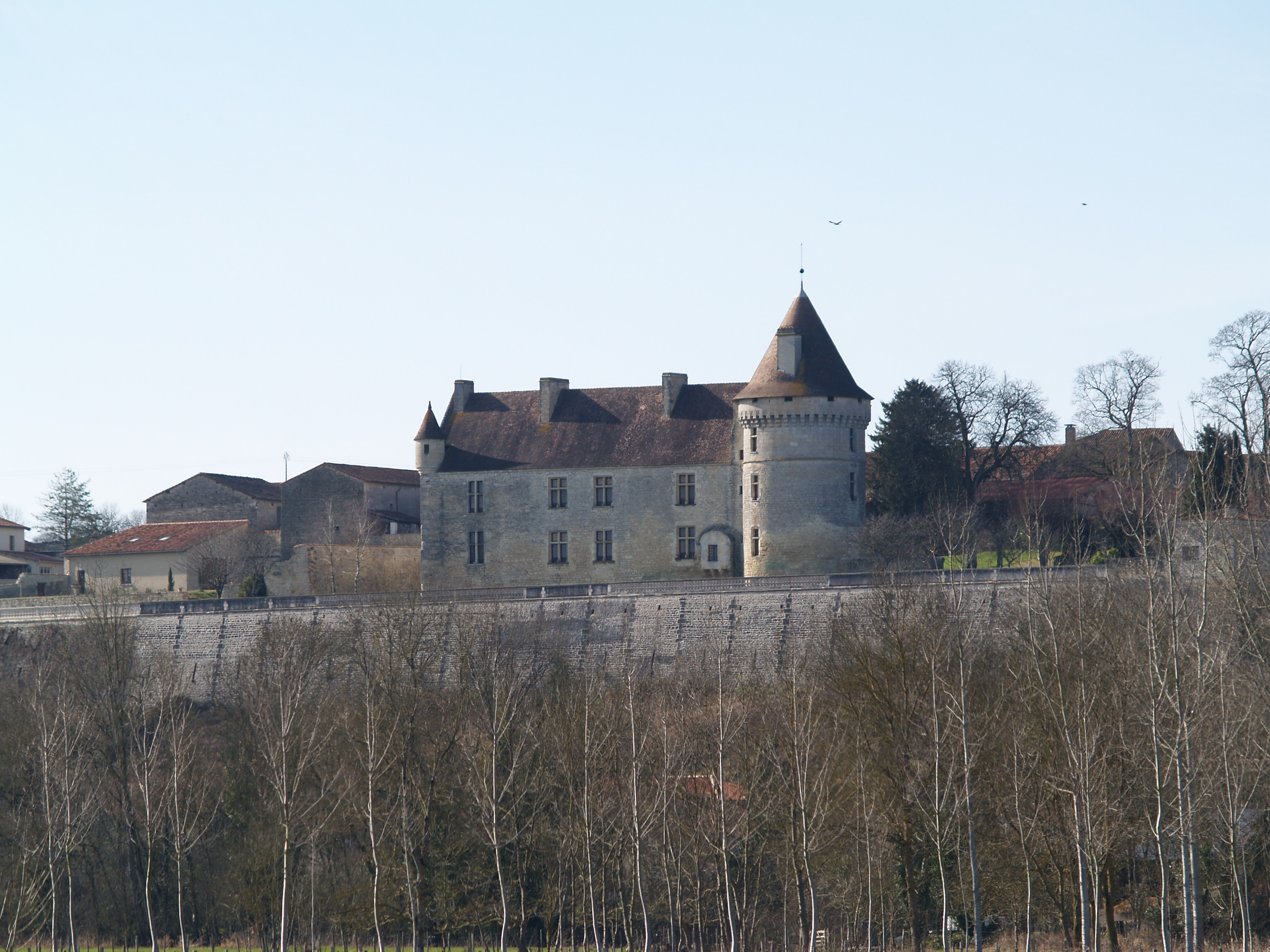
- Chateau
- Location of Bayers
- Location within France Location within Nouvelle-Aquitaine
- Coordinates: 45°55′20″N 0°13′48″E
- Country: France
- Region: Nouvelle-Aquitaine
- Department: Charente
- Arrondissement: Confolens
- Canton: Boixe-et-Manslois
- Commune: Aunac-sur-Charente
- Area^{1}: 3.59 km^{2} (1.39 sq mi)
- Elevation: 104 m (341 ft)
- Highest elevation: 123 m (404 ft)
- Lowest elevation: 67 m (220 ft)
- Population (2017): 117
  - Density: 32.6/km^{2} (84.4/sq mi)
- Time zone: UTC+01:00 (CET)
  - Summer (DST): UTC+02:00 (CEST)
- Postal code: 16460
- ^{1} French Land Register data, which excludes lakes, ponds, glaciers > 1 km^{2} (0.386 sq mi or 247 acres) and river estuaries.

Bayers (French pronunciation: [baje]) is a former commune in the Charente department in southwestern France. On 1 January 2017, it was merged into the new commune Aunac-sur-Charente.

== Population ==
Historical population

| Year | Pop. | ±% p.a. |
|---|---|---|
| 1793 | 428 | — |
| 1821 | 454 | +0.21% |
| 1846 | 458 | +0.04% |
| 1872 | 367 | −0.85% |
| 1901 | 265 | −1.12% |
| 1926 | 208 | −0.96% |
| 1946 | 189 | −0.48% |
| 1962 | 177 | −0.41% |

| Year | Pop. | ±% p.a. |
|---|---|---|
| 1968 | 156 | −2.08% |
| 1975 | 153 | −0.28% |
| 1982 | 149 | −0.38% |
| 1990 | 156 | +0.58% |
| 1999 | 129 | −2.09% |
| 2006 | 123 | −0.68% |
| 2017 | 117 | −0.45% |

Source: EHESS and INSEE (2017)

== See also ==
- Communes of the Charente department
