= Angoumois =

Historic county and province of France

- Flag Coat of arms

- Coordinates: 45°39′N 0°10′E
- Country: France
- Time zone: CET
- Counts: Marachaire (561–569); Francis of Angoulême (1496–1515)

Angoumois (French pronunciation: [ɑ̃ɡumwa]; Occitan: Anguemosés), historically the County of Angoulême, was a county and province of France, originally inferior to the parent duchy of Aquitaine, similar to the Périgord to its east but lower and generally less forested, equally with occasional vineyards throughout. Its capital was Angoulême with its citadel and castle above the river Charente.

It almost corresponds to the Charente Department which also takes in the east of the coastal comté de Saintonge.

== History ==
This area was a county and province of France, originally inferior to the parent duchy of Aquitaine, similar to the Périgord to its east. Many of the historic churches and castles, or castle ruins in the county, survive. Today it is noted for sunflowers and Cognac, the archetypal brandy, one of its small towns being at its origin, as much as its historic mainstay crops of corn and wheat. In the High Middle Ages, an enlarged Aquitaine pledged loyalty to the Angevin kings of England. Their claims in France triggered the Hundred Years' War, in which the kingdom of France emerged victorious in the 1450s, with many incorporated areas coming to be ruled directly by the French kings.

The county was created on the Gallo-Roman civitas of Iculisma, the current Angoulême. It included the following "pays" (lit. countries), or natural regions of France: Ruffec, Horte and Tardoire and part of Confolentais, and was part, with Cognac, of the possessions of the House of Valois-Angoulême when they acceded to the throne of France. First placed under the authority of the Count of Angoulême, it was gradually integrated, from the 15th century, into the administration of modern France.

Map of France in 1030

Map of France in 1154
