= Traditionalist conservatism =

Political ideology advocating traditional morals and social order

Traditionalist conservatism, often known as classical conservatism, is a political and social philosophy that emphasizes the importance of transcendent moral principles, manifested through certain posited natural laws to which it is claimed society should adhere. It is one of many different forms of conservatism. Traditionalist conservatism, as known today, is rooted in Edmund Burke's political philosophy, as well as the similar views of Joseph de Maistre, who designated the rationalist rejection of Christianity during previous decades as being directly responsible for the Reign of Terror which followed the French Revolution. Traditionalists value social ties and the preservation of ancestral institutions above what they perceive as excessive rationalism and individualism. One of the first uses of the phrase "conservatism" began around 1818 with a monarchist newspaper named Le Conservateur, written by François-René de Chateaubriand with the help of Louis de Bonald.

The concepts of nation, culture, custom, convention, religious roots, and tradition are heavily emphasized in traditionalist conservatism. Theoretical reason is regarded as of secondary importance to practical reason. The state is also viewed as a social endeavor with spiritual and organic characteristics. Traditionalists think that any positive change arises based within the community's traditions rather than as a consequence of seeking a complete and deliberate break with the past. Leadership, authority, and hierarchy are seen as natural to humans. Traditionalism, in the forms of Jacobitism, the Counter-Enlightenment and early Romanticism, arose in Europe during the 18th century as a backlash against the Enlightenment, as well as the English and French Revolutions. More recent forms have included early German Romanticism, Carlism, and the Gaelic revival. Traditionalist conservatism began to establish itself as an intellectual and political force in the mid-20th century.

== Key principles ==
=== Religious faith and natural law ===
Natural law is championed by Thomas Aquinas in the Summa Theologiae. There, he affirms the principle of noncontradiction ("the same thing cannot be affirmed and denied at the same time") as being the first principle of theoretical reason, and ("good is to be done and pursued and evil avoided") as the first principle of practical reason, or that which precedes and determines one's actions. The account of Medieval Christian philosophy is the appreciation of the concept of the summum bonum or "highest good". It is only through the silent contemplation that someone is able to achieve the idea of the good. The rest of natural law was first developed somewhat in Aristotle's work, also was referenced and affirmed in the works by Cicero, and it has been developed by the Christian Albert the Great. This is not meant to imply that traditionalist conservatives must be Thomists and embrace a robustly Thomistic natural law theory. Individuals who embrace non-Thomistic understandings of natural law rooted in, e.g., non-Aristotelian accounts affirmed in segments of Greco-Roman, patristic, medieval, and Reformation thought, can identify with traditionalist conservatism.

=== Tradition and custom ===
Traditionalists think that tradition and custom should guide man and his worldview, as their names imply. Each generation inherits its ancestors' experience and culture, which man is able to transmit down to his offspring through custom and precedent. Edmund Burke, noted that "the individual is foolish, but the species is wise." Furthermore, according to John Kekes, "tradition represents for conservatives a continuum enmeshing the individual and social, and is immune to reasoned critique." Traditional conservatism typically prefers practical reason instead of theoretical reason.

Conservatism, it has been argued, is based on living tradition rather than abstract political thinking. Within conservatism, political journalist Edmund Fawcett and historian Xiao Gongqin argues the existence of two strains of conservative thought, a flexible conservatism associated with Edmund Burke (which allows for limited reform), and an inflexible conservatism associated with Joseph de Maistre (which is more reactionary).

Within flexible conservatism, some commentators may break it down further, contrasting the "pragmatic conservatism" which is still quite skeptical of abstract theoretical reason, vs. the "rational conservatism" which does not have skepticism of said reason, and simply favors some sort of hierarchy as sufficient.

=== Stratification, organicism, and authority ===
Traditionalist conservatives believe that human society is essentially hierarchical (i.e., it always involves various interdependent inequalities, degrees, and classes) and that political structures that recognize this fact prove the most just, thriving, and generally beneficial. Stratification allows for the preservation of the whole community simultaneously, instead of protecting one part at the expense of the others.

Organicism also characterizes conservative thought. Edmund Burke notably viewed society from an organicist standpoint, as opposed to a more mechanistic view developed by liberal thinkers. Two concepts play a role in organicism in conservative thought:

- The internal elements of the organic society cannot be randomly reconfigured (similar to a living creature).
- The organic society is based upon natural needs and instincts, rather than that of a new ideological blueprint conceived by political theorists.

Traditional authority is a common tenet of conservatism, albeit expressed in different forms. Alexandre Kojève distinguished between two forms of traditional authority: the father (fathers, priests, monarchs) and the master (aristocrats, military commanders). Obedience to said authority, whether familial or religious, continues to be a central tenet of conservatism to this day.

=== Integralism and divine law ===
Integralism, typically a Catholic idea but also a broader religious one, asserts that faith and religious principles ought to be the basis for public law and policy when possible. The goal of such a system is to integrate religious authority with political power. While integralist principles have been sporadically associated with traditionalism, it was largely popularized by the works of Joseph de Maistre.

=== Agrarianism ===
The countryside, as well as the values associated with it, are greatly valued (sometimes even being romanticized as in pastoral poetry). Agrarian ideals (such as conserving small family farms, open land, natural resource conservation, and land stewardship) are important to certain traditionalists' conception of rural life. Louis de Bonald wrote a short piece on a comparison of the agriculturalism to industrialism.

=== Family structure ===
The importance of proper family structures is a common value expressed in conservatism. The concept of traditional morality is often coalesced with familialism and family values, being viewed as the bedrock of society within traditionalist thought. Louis de Bonald wrote a piece on marital dissolution named "On Divorce" in 1802, outlining his opposition to the practice. Bonald stated that the broader human society was composed of three subunits (religious society – the church, domestic society – the family, public society – the state). He added that since the family made up one of these core categories, divorce would thereby represent an assault on the social order.

=== Morality ===
Morality, specifically traditional moral values, is a common area of importance within traditional conservatism, going back to Edmund Burke. Burke believed that a notion of sensibility was at the root of man's moral intuition. Furthermore, he theorized that divine moral law was both transcendent and immanent within humans. While moral discussions exist across the political aisle, conservatism is distinct for including notions of purity-based reasoning. The type of morality attributed to Edmund Burke is referred to some as moral traditionalism.

=== Communitarianism ===
Communitarianism is an ideology that broadly prioritizes the importance of the community over the individual's freedoms. Joseph de Maistre was notably against individualism, and blamed Rousseau's individualism on the destructive nature of the French Revolution. Some may argue that the communitarian ethic has considerable overlap with the conservative movement, although they remain distinct. While communitarians may draw upon similar elements of moral infrastructure to make their arguments, the communitarian opposition to liberalism is still more limited than that of conservatives. Furthermore, the communitarian prescription for society is more limited in scope than that of social conservatives. The term is typically used in two different senses; philosophical communitarianism which rejects liberal precepts and atomistic theory, vs. ideological communitarianism which is a syncretistic belief that holds in priority the positive right to social services for members of said community. Communitarianism may overlap with stewardship, in an environmental sense as well.

=== Social order ===
Social order is a common tenet of conservatism, namely the maintenance of social ties, whether the family or the law. The concept may also tie into social cohesion. Joseph de Maistre defended the necessity of the public executioner as encouraging stability. In the St Petersburg Dialogues, he wrote: "all power, all subordination rests on the executioner: he is the horror and the bond of human association. Remove this incomprehensible agent from the world, and the very moment order gives way to chaos, thrones topple, and society disappears."

The concept of social order is not exclusive to conservatism, although it tends to be fairly prevalent within it. Both Jean Jacques Rousseau and Joseph de Maistre believed in social order, the difference was that Maistre preferred the status quo, indivisibility of law and rule, and the mesh of Church with State. Meanwhile, Rousseau preferred social contract and the ability to withdraw from such (and pick the ruler) as well as a separation of Church and state. Furthermore, Rousseau went on the criticize the "cult of the state" as well.

=== Classicism and high culture ===
Traditionalists defend classical Western civilization and value an education informed by the sifting of texts starting in the Roman World and refined under Medieval Scholasticism and Renaissance humanism. Similarly, traditionalist conservatives are Classicists who revere high culture in all of its manifestations (e.g. literature, Classical music, architecture, art, and theatre).

=== Localism ===
Traditionalists consider localism a core principle, described as a sense of devotion to one's homeland, in contrast to nationalists, who value the role of the state or nation over the local community. Traditionalist conservatives believe that allegiance to family, local community, and region is often more important than political commitments. Traditionalists also prioritize community closeness above nationalist state interest, preferring the civil society of Burke's "little platoons". However, this does not mean that Conservatives are against state authority. Quite the opposite, rather Conservatives prefer simply that the state allow and encourage units like families and churches to thrive and develop.

Alternatively, some theorists state that nationalism can easily be radicalized and lead to jingoism, which sees the state as apart from the local community and family structure rather than as a product of both.

An example of a traditionalist conservative approach to immigration may be seen in Bishop John Joseph Frederick Otto Zardetti's September 21, 1892 "Sermon on the Mother and the Bride", which was a defence of Roman Catholic German-Americans desire to preserve their faith, ancestral culture, and to continue speaking their heritage language of the German language in the United States, against both the English only movement and accusations of being Hyphenated Americans.

== History ==
=== British influences ===
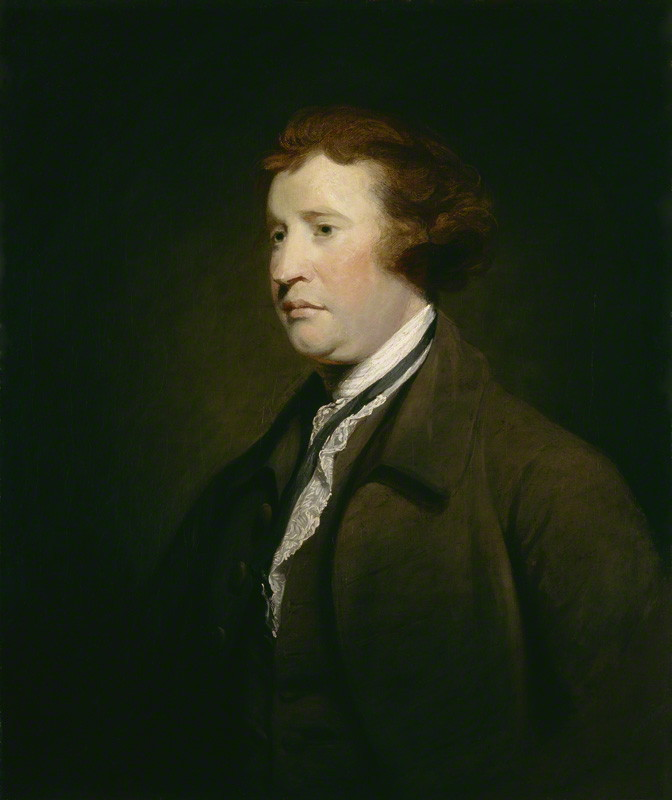
Edmund Burke

Edmund Burke, an Anglo-Irish Whig statesman and philosopher whose political principles were rooted in moral natural law and the Western heritage, is one of the first expositors of traditionalist conservatism, although Toryism represented an even earlier, more primitive form of traditionalist conservatism. Burke believed in prescriptive rights, which he considered to be "God-given". He argued for what he called "ordered liberty" (best reflected in the unwritten law of the British constitutional monarchy). He also fought for universal ideals that were supported by institutions such as the church, the family, and the state. He was a fierce critic of the principles behind the French Revolution, and in 1790, his observations on its excesses and radicalism were collected in Reflections on the Revolution in France. In Reflections, Burke called for the constitutional enactment of specific, concrete rights and warned that abstract rights could be easily abused to justify tyranny. American social critic and historian Russell Kirk wrote: "The Reflections burns with all the wrath and anguish of a prophet who saw the traditions of Christendom and the fabric of civil society dissolving before his eyes."

Burke's influence was felt by later intellectuals and authors in both Britain and continental Europe. The English Romantic poets Samuel Taylor Coleridge, William Wordsworth and Robert Southey, as well as Scottish Romantic author Sir Walter Scott, and the counter-revolutionary writers François-René de Chateaubriand, Louis de Bonald and Joseph de Maistre were all affected by his ideas. Burke's legacy was best represented in the United States by the Federalist Party and its leaders, such as President John Adams and Secretary of the Treasury Alexander Hamilton.

=== French influences ===
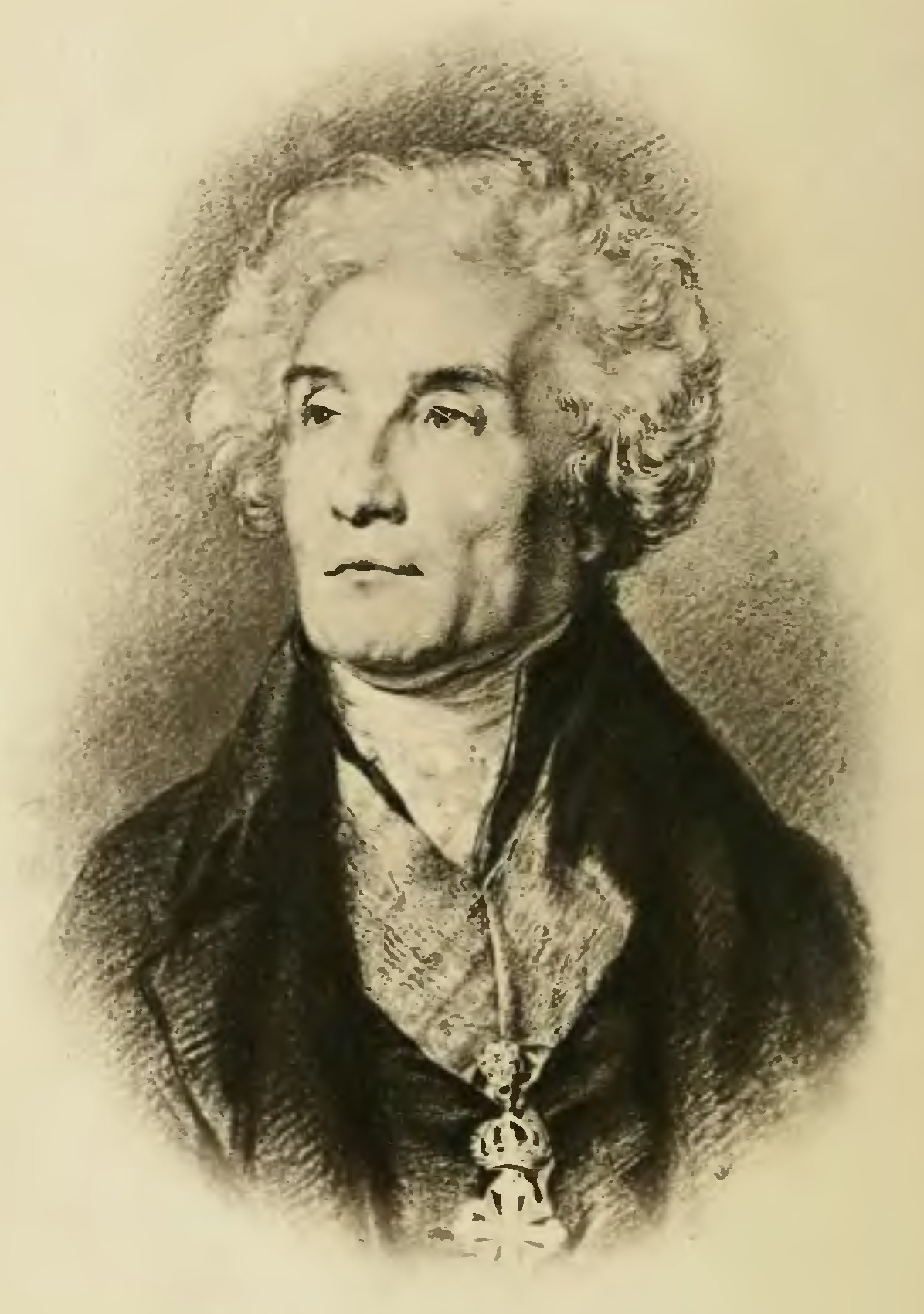
Joseph de Maistre (1753–1821)

Joseph de Maistre, a French lawyer, was another founder of conservatism. He was an ultramontane Catholic, and thoroughly rejected progressivism and rationalism. In 1796, he published a political pamphlet entitled, Considerations on France, that mirrored Burke's Reflections. Maistre viewed the French Revolution as "evil schism", and a movement premised on the "sentiment of hatred". After the demise of Napoleon, Maistre returned to France to meet with pro-royalist circles. In 1819, Maistre published a piece called Du Pape which outlined the Pope as the key sovereign, unto which authority derives from.

=== Critics of material progress ===
Three cultural conservatives and skeptics of material development, Samuel Taylor Coleridge, Thomas Carlyle, and John Henry Newman, were staunch supporters of Burke's classical conservatism.

According to conservative scholar Peter Viereck, Coleridge and his colleague and fellow poet William Wordsworth began as followers of the French Revolution and the radical utopianism it engendered. Their collection of poems, Lyrical Ballads, published in 1798, however, rejected the Enlightenment notion of reason triumphing over faith and tradition. Later works by Coleridge, such as Lay Sermons (1816), Biographia Literaria (1817) and Aids to Reflection (1825), defended traditional conservative positions on hierarchy and organic society, criticism of materialism and the merchant class, and the need for "inner growth" that is rooted in a traditional and religious culture. Coleridge was a strong supporter of social institutions and an outspoken opponent of Jeremy Bentham and his utilitarian theory.

Thomas Carlyle, a writer, historian, and essayist, was an early traditionalist thinker, defending medieval ideals such as aristocracy, hierarchy, organic society, and class unity against communism and laissez-faire capitalism's "cash nexus." The "cash nexus," according to Carlyle, occurs when social interactions are reduced to economic gain. Carlyle, a lover of the poor, claimed that mobs, plutocrats, anarchists, communists, socialists, liberals, and others were threatening the fabric of British society by exploiting them and perpetuating class animosity. A devotee of Germanic culture and Romanticism, Carlyle is best known for his works, Sartor Resartus (1833–1834) and Past and Present (1843).

The Oxford Movement, a religious movement aimed at restoring Anglicanism's Catholic nature, gave the Church of England a "catholic rebirth" in the mid-19th century. The Tractarians (so named for the publication of their Tracts for the Times) criticized theological liberalism while preserving "dogma, ritual, poetry, [and] tradition," led by John Keble, Edward Pusey, and John Henry Newman. Newman (who converted to Roman Catholicism in 1845 and was later made a Cardinal and a canonized saint) and the Tractarians, like Coleridge and Carlyle, were critical of material progress, or the idea that money, prosperity, and economic gain constituted the totality of human existence.

=== Cultural and artistic criticism ===
Culture and the arts were also important to British traditionalist conservatives, and two of the most prominent defenders of tradition in culture and the arts were Matthew Arnold and John Ruskin.

A poet and cultural commentator, Matthew Arnold is most recognized for his poems and literary, social, and religious criticism. His book Culture and Anarchy (1869) criticized Victorian middle-class norms (Arnold referred to middle class tastes in literature as "philistinism") and advocated a return to ancient literature. Arnold was likewise skeptical of the plutocratic grasping at socioeconomic issues that had been denounced by Coleridge, Carlyle, and the Oxford Movement. Arnold was a vehement critic of the Liberal Party and its Nonconformist base. He mocked Liberal efforts to disestablish the Anglican Church in Ireland, establish a Catholic university there, allow dissenters to be buried in Church of England cemeteries, demand temperance, and ignore the need to improve middle class members rather than impose their unreasonable beliefs on society. Education was essential, and by that, Arnold meant a close reading and attachment to the cultural classics, coupled with critical reflection. He feared anarchy—the fragmentation of life into isolated facts that is caused by dangerous educational panaceas that emerge from materialistic and utilitarian philosophies. He was appalled at the shamelessness of the sensationalistic new journalism of the sort he witnessed on his tour of the United States in 1888. He prophesied, "If one were searching for the best means to efface and kill in a whole nation the discipline of self-respect, the feeling for what is elevated, he could do no better than take the American newspapers."

One of the issues that traditionalist conservatives have often emphasized is that capitalism is just as suspect as the classical liberalism that gave birth to it. Cultural and artistic critic John Ruskin, a medievalist who considered himself a "Christian communist" and cared much about standards in culture, the arts, and society, continued this tradition. The Industrial Revolution, according to Ruskin (and all 19th-century cultural conservatives), had caused dislocation, rootlessness, and vast urbanization of the poor. He wrote The Stones of Venice (1851–1853), a work of art criticism that attacked the Classical heritage while upholding Gothic art and architecture. The Seven Lamps of Architecture and Unto This Last (1860) were two of his other masterpieces.

=== One-nation conservatism ===
Burke, Coleridge, Carlyle, Newman, and other traditionalist conservatives' beliefs were distilled into former British Prime Minister Benjamin Disraeli's politics and ideology. When he was younger, Disraeli was an outspoken opponent of middle-class capitalism and the Manchester liberals' industrial policies (the Reform Bill and the Corn Laws). In order to ameliorate the suffering of the urban poor in the aftermath of the Industrial Revolution, Disraeli proposed "one-nation conservatism," in which a coalition of aristocrats and commoners would band together to counter the liberal middle class's influence. This new coalition would be a way to interact with disenfranchised people while also rooting them in old conservative principles. Disraeli's ideas (especially his critique of utilitarianism) were popularized in the "Young England" movement and in books like Vindication of the English Constitution (1835), The Radical Tory (1837), and his "social novels," Coningsby (1844) and Sybil (1845). His one-nation conservatism was revived a few years later in Lord Randolph Churchill's Tory democracy and in the early 21st century in British philosopher Phillip Blond's Red Tory thesis.

=== Distributism ===
Hilaire Belloc in 1915

In the early 20th century, traditionalist conservatism found its defenders through the efforts of Hilaire Belloc, G. K. Chesterton and other proponents of the socioeconomic system they advocated: distributism. Originating in the papal encyclical Rerum novarum, distributism employed the concept of subsidiarity as a "third way" solution to the twin evils of communism and capitalism. It favors local economies, small business, the agrarian way of life and craftsmen and artists. Otto von Bismarck implemented one of the first modern welfare systems in Germany during the 1880s. Traditional communities akin to those found in the Middle Ages were advocated in books like Belloc's The Servile State (1912), Economics for Helen (1924), and An Essay on the Restoration of Property (1936), and Chesterton's The Outline of Sanity (1926), while big business and big government were condemned. Distributist views were accepted in the United States by the journalist Herbert Agar and Catholic activist Dorothy Day as well as through the influence of the German-born British economist E. F. Schumacher, and were comparable to Wilhelm Roepke's work.

T. S. Eliot was a staunch supporter of Western culture and traditional Christianity. Eliot was a political reactionary who used literary modernism to achieve traditionalist goals. Following in the footsteps of Edmund Burke, Samuel Taylor Coleridge, Thomas Carlyle, John Ruskin, G. K. Chesterton, and Hilaire Belloc, he wrote After Strange Gods (1934), and Notes towards the Definition of Culture (1948). At Harvard University, where he was educated by Irving Babbitt and George Santayana, Eliot was acquainted with Allen Tate and Russell Kirk.

T. S. Eliot praised Christopher Dawson as the most potent intellectual influence in Britain, and he was a prominent player in 20th-century traditionalism. The belief that religion was at the center of all civilization, especially Western culture, was central to his work, and his books reflected this view, notably The Age of Gods (1928), Religion and Culture (1948), and Religion and the Rise of Western Culture (1950). Dawson, a contributor to Eliot's Criterion, believed that religion and culture were crucial to rebuilding the West after World War II in the aftermath of fascism and the advent of communism.

== In the United Kingdom ==
=== Philosophers ===
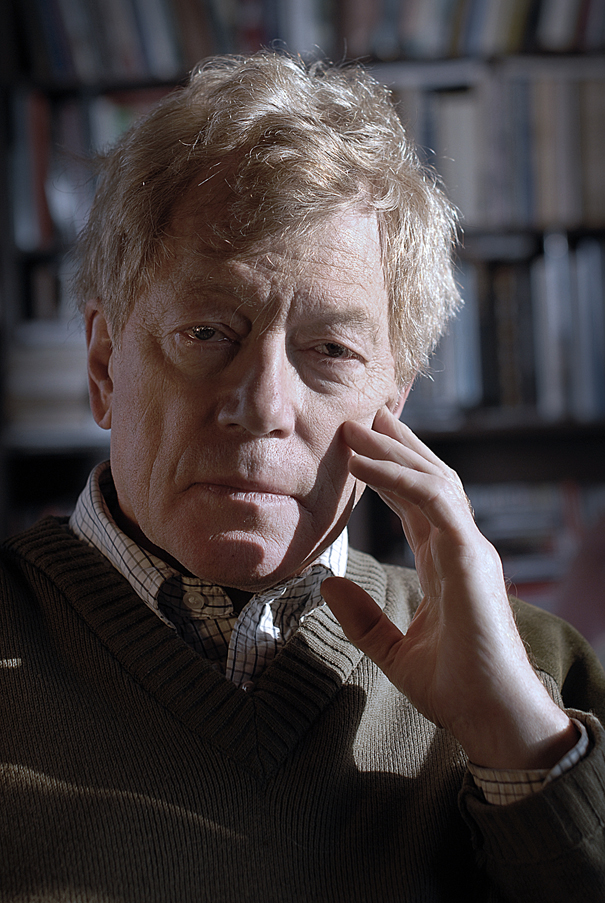
Roger Scruton

Roger Scruton, a British philosopher, was a self-described traditionalist and conservative. One of his most well-known books, The Meaning of Conservatism (1980), is on foreign policy, animal rights, arts and culture, and philosophy. Scruton was a member of the American Enterprise Institute, the Institute for the Psychological Sciences, the Trinity Forum, and the Center for European Renewal. Modern Age, National Review, The American Spectator, The New Criterion, and City Journal were among the many publications for which he wrote.

Phillip Blond, a British philosopher, has recently gained notoriety as a proponent of traditionalist philosophy, specifically progressive conservatism, or Red Toryism. Blond believes that Red Toryism would rejuvenate British conservatism and society by combining civic communitarianism, localism, and traditional values. He has formed a think tank, ResPublica.

=== Publications and political organizations ===
The oldest traditionalist publication in the United Kingdom is The Salisbury Review, which was founded by British philosopher Roger Scruton. The Salisbury Review's current managing editor is Merrie Cave.

A group of traditionalist MPs known as the Cornerstone Group was created in 2005 within the British Conservative Party. The Cornerstone Group represents "faith, flag, and family" and stands for traditional values. Edward Leigh and John Henry Hayes are two notable members.

== In Europe ==
The Edmund Burke Foundation is a traditionalist educational foundation established in the Netherlands and is modeled after the Intercollegiate Studies Institute. It was created by traditionalists such as academic Andreas Kinneging and journalist Bart Jan Spruyt as a think tank. The Center for European Renewal is linked with it.

In 2007, a number of leading traditionalist scholars from Europe, as well as representatives of the Edmund Burke Foundation and the Intercollegiate Studies Institute, created the Center for European Renewal, which is designed to be the European version of the Intercollegiate Studies Institute.

== In the United States ==
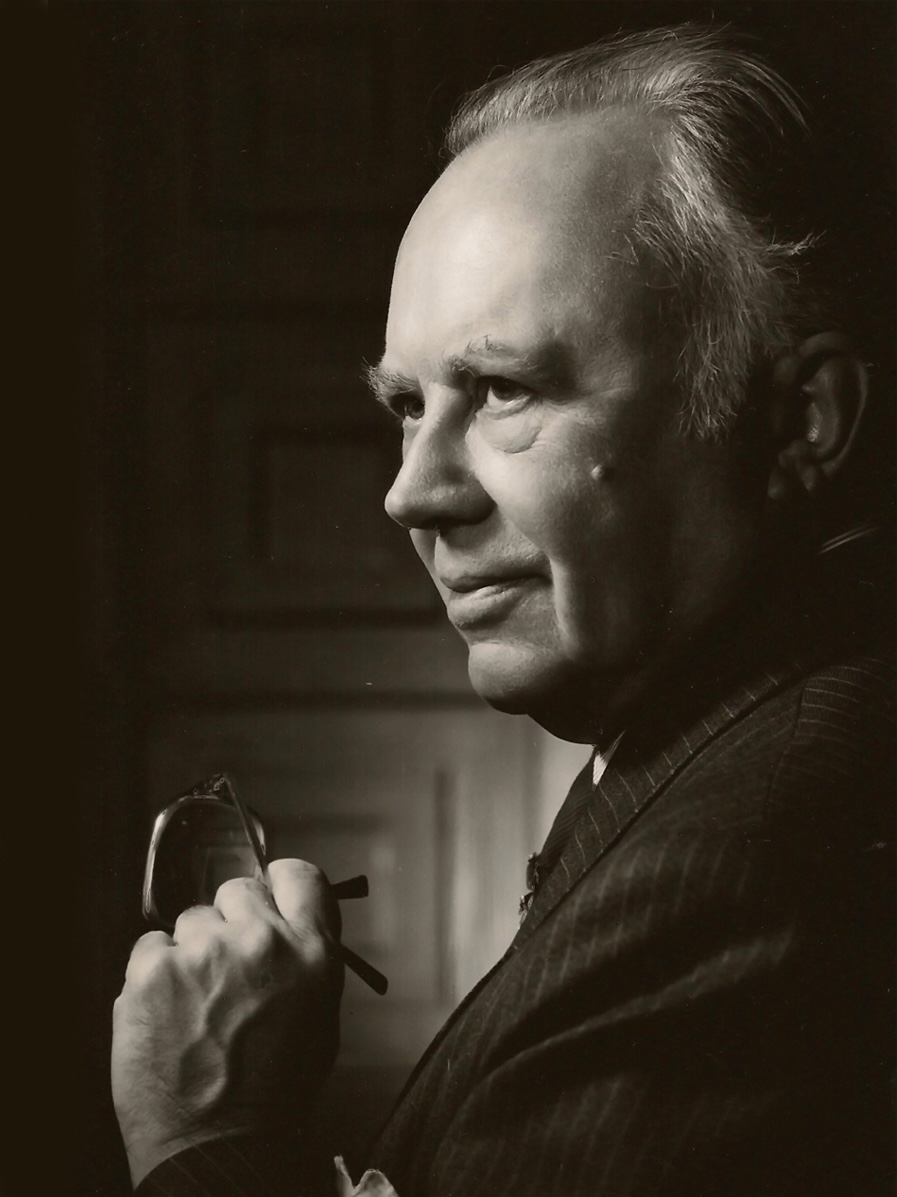
Russell Kirk

The Federalists had no ties to European-style nobility, royalty, or organized churches when it came to "classical conservatism." John Adams was one of the first champions of a traditional social order.

The Whig Party had an approach that mirrored Burkean conservatism in the post-Revolutionary era. Rufus Choate argued that lawyers were the guardians and preservers of the Constitution. In the antebellum period, George Ticknor and Edward Everett were the "Guardians of Civilization." Orestes Brownson examined how America satisfies Catholic tradition and Western civilization. The Southern Agrarians, or Fugitives, were another group of traditionalist conservatives. In 1930, some of the Fugitives published I'll Take My Stand, which applied agrarian standards to politics and economics.

Following WWII, the initial stirrings of a "traditionalist movement" emerged. Certain conservative scholars and writers garnered the attention of the popular press. Russell Kirk's The Conservative Mind, an expansion of his PhD dissertation written in Scotland, was the book that defined the traditionalist school. Kirk was an independent scholar, writer, critic, and man of letters. He was friends with William F. Buckley Jr., a National Review columnist, editor, and syndicated columnist. When Barry Goldwater combated the Republican Party's Eastern Establishment in 1964, Kirk backed him in the primaries and campaigned for him. After Goldwater's defeat, the New Right reunited in the late 1970s and found a new leader in Ronald Reagan. Ronald Reagan created a coalition of libertarians, foreign-policy hawks, business conservatives, as well as Christian social conservatives and maintained his power by solidifying a newer form of conservative alliance that would continue to dominate the political landscape of the American conservatism to this day.

== Relationship with Moderate Conservatism ==
Edmund Burke’s views are generally considered by scholars and adherents to be emblematic of and foundational to Traditionalist Conservatism. However, some traditionalist thinkers, such as Adam Wielomski, argue that Burke’s views are in fact Liberal Conservative, and that the two are incompatible. They posit that reactionary ultraconservatism is the only truly correct form of Traditionalist Conservatism, and of Conservatism in general. For them, Moderate conservatism is an embodiment of liberalism because it allowed itself to be influenced by revolutionary ideologies and their followers and became syncretic, which they assert sabotages the restoration and renewal of the pre-bourgeois revolution social order, the main objective of ultraconservatives in opposition to the French Revolution. This strain of thought is strongly integralist and opposed to any concession to modernism, deriving from Joseph de Maistre's philosophy. They point to figures like Alexis de Tocqueville, self-described Liberals later recognized as liberal conservatives or conservative liberals as evidence of this claim.

Conversely, authors such as Miguel Ayuso Torres and Nicolás Gómez Dávila consider that traditionalism nominally should not be considered a form of conservatism, and that instead it is essentially purely Reactionary and Counter-revolutionary, while conservatism as an ideology is perceived by these authors as essentially "moderate Revolutionism" and "gradual Progressivism" since its origins are seen by them to lie in the Girondins and the Right-wing of the French Revolution, who only wanted to preserve traditional values and some traditional institutions like the Monarchy for Utilitarian motives, but not in their view the integral aspects of Traditional Society such as an organization based in natural law and customary law. They denounce conservatism as modernist in its origin due to its supposed lack of compromise with the Perennial philosophy of Medieval Scholasticism (or its Greco-Roman equivalents), and instead its alleged embrace of enlightenment philosophy to conserve the liberal revolutions without reaction to the errors of modern political philosophy, and propose that a radical change and a return to tradition in its Metaphysics is urgently necessary. Despite that, these thinkers do not mean that traditionalism is not "healthily conservative" (in the verbal rather than ideological sense), since they admit that a certain coincidence with conservatism is a prerequisite for reactionism (but only by accident, not through causal mechanisms).

But the paradigm of the conservative has been drawn precisely on the one who conserves what should not be conserved. Jaime Balmes, the Catalan philosopher of common sense, regarding the conservative party, but which can be applied to the conservative man, also said it ironically: the conservative conserves, yes, the revolution. That is largely what conservatism consists of, in the conservation of what should not be conserved, in the conservation of what tradition broke. Reactionism, on the other hand, implies reaction against the revolution, against the revolution that seems never to be satisfied with anything, but also against the one that seems to be satisfied in some of its stages and which is ultimately the one that consolidates itself, in an unstable equilibrium, of course.

— Miguel Ayuso

These assertions and the worldviews upon which they are based have been widely criticized as falsely dichotomous and ahistorical by historians and philosophers for ignoring both the evolutionary and changing nature of pre-modern society and the theoretical and practical overlap and shared principles and beliefs of the ideologies in question, as well as for being based on misunderstandings of the concept and institution of tradition and the history of Western civilization. Complicating these perspectives are figures such as Erik von Kuehnelt-Leddihn, strongly traditionalist, reactionary, pro-aristocratic, and pro-Christian yet also outspokenly economically liberal and libertarian, and who see moderate Enlightenment and Counter-Enlightenment philosophy as sharing significant common ground and as largely in continuity with earlier Western philosophy. He asserted that liberal autocracies like Austria-Hungary were fully situated in the tradition of Western civilization, and that Scholasticism was the direct predecessor of modern rationalism and empiricism, in opposition to Straussian arguments to the contrary.

== Political organizations ==
The Trinity Forum, Ellis Sandoz's Eric Voegelin Institute and the Eric Voegelin Society, the Conservative Institute's New Centurion Program, the T. S. Eliot Society, the Malcolm Muggeridge Society, and the Free Enterprise Institute's Center for the American Idea are all traditionalist groups. The Wilbur Foundation is a prominent supporter of traditionalist activities, particularly the Russell Kirk Center.

== Literary ==
Literary traditionalists are frequently associated with political conservatives and the right wing, whilst experimental works and the avant-garde are frequently associated with progressives and the left wing. John Barth, a postmodern writer and literary theorist, said: "I confess to missing, in apprentice seminars in the later 1970s and the 1980s, that lively Make-It-New spirit of the Buffalo Sixties. A roomful of young traditionalists can be as depressing as a roomful of young Republicans."

James Fenimore Cooper, Nathaniel Hawthorne, James Russell Lowell, W. H. Mallock, Robert Frost and T. S. Eliot are among the literary figures covered in Russell Kirk's The Conservative Mind (1953). The writings of Rudyard Kipling and Phyllis McGinley are presented as instances of literary traditionalism in Kirk's The Conservative Reader (1982). Kirk was also a well-known author of spooky and suspense fiction with a Gothic flavor. Ray Bradbury and Madeleine L'Engle both praised novels such as Old House of Fear, A Creature of the Twilight, and Lord of the Hollow Dark as well as short stories such as "Lex Talionis", "Lost Lake", "Beyond the Stumps", "Ex Tenebris," and "Fate's Purse." Kirk was also close friends with a number of 20th-century literary heavyweights, including T. S. Eliot, Roy Campbell, Wyndham Lewis, Ray Bradbury, Madeleine L'Engle, Fernando Sánchez Dragó, and Flannery O'Connor, all of whom wrote conservative poetry or fiction.

Evelyn Waugh and G. K. Chesterton – British novelists and traditionalist Catholics – are often considered traditionalist conservatives.

== See also ==
- Christian democracy
- Communitarianism
- Counter-Enlightenment
- Corporatism
- Classical liberalism
- Distributism
- High Tories
- Historical school of economics
- Integralism
- Localism (politics)
- Monarchism
- National conservatism
- Natural order (philosophy)
- Neoauthoritarianism (China)
- New Humanism
- New traditionalism
- Organicism
- Paleoconservatism
- Philosophical naturalism
- Red Tory
- Regionalism
- Right-wing authoritarianism
- Royalism
- Social conservatism
- Tory
- Tory (political faction)
- Traditionalism (Spain)

== Bibliography ==
- Deutsch, Kenneth L.; Fishman, Ethan (2010). The Dilemmas of American Conservatism. University Press of Kentucky. ISBN 978-0-813-13962-3.
- Vincent, Andrew (2009). Modern Political Ideologies. John Wiley & Sons. ISBN 978-1-444-31105-1.
