= Considerations on France =

1796 political pamphlet by Joseph de Maistre

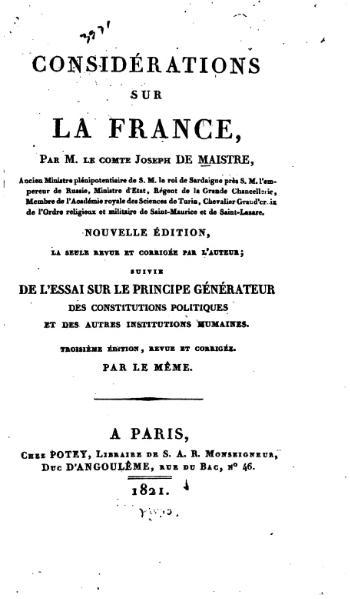
- 1821 title page of Considérations sur la France
- Author: Joseph de Maistre
- Original title: Considérations sur la France
- Language: French
- Genre: Political philosophy · Social criticism · Culture war
- Publication date: 1796
- Publication place: France
- Pages: 250
- Text: Considerations on France at Internet Archive

Considerations on France (French: Considérations sur la France) is a 1796 political pamphlet and treatise by the Savoyard philosopher Joseph de Maistre about the ongoing French Revolution. Maistre presents a providential interpretation of the Revolution and argues for a new alliance of throne and altar under a restored Bourbon monarchy. The work is the best-known French equivalent of Edmund Burke's work Reflections on the Revolution in France (1790).

== Thesis ==
Maistre stated that France has a divine mission as the principal instrument of good and evil on Earth. He interpreted the Revolution of 1789 as a providential event in which the monarchy, the aristocracy and the Ancien Régime in general, instead of directing the influence of French civilization to the benefit of mankind, had promoted the atheistic doctrines of the 18th-century philosophes. He claimed that the crimes of the Reign of Terror were the logical consequence of Enlightenment thought as well as its divinely-decreed punishment for spreading Enlightenment ideas.

== Reception ==
Maistre's political pamphlet quickly established his European reputation as a formidable defendant of throne and altar. The pretender to the throne of France, the future king Louis XVIII, sent Maistre his greetings upon the publication. To honour Maistre for his work, Napoleon made him French against his will in 1802.

The circumstances at the time of its publication in 1796 meant that Maistre's call for a restoration of the monarchy remained unanswered. But in 1814, when his program was implemented, Maistre would be regarded as a prophet. The prominent French author Jules Barbey d'Aurevilly, who was an admirer of Maistre, spoke of a "delayed explosion" and compared it to a cannonball shot with an unusually long interval between the flash and the boom.

== Style ==
The work has received much attention for its stylistic qualities. The prominent literary critic Charles Augustin Sainte-Beuve called it a 'sublime pamphlet.' Scholar of Romanticism Charles L. Lombard characterized it as primarily a creative work, filled with paradox and drama. French historian Jean-Louis Darcel suggested that the most seductive aspect of the work was its tone:

The sparkle of the visionary, a prophetic tone, and in its best pages, an apocalyptic lyricism linking up with the scriptural origins of Judeo-Christian civilization, this is what seemed new, what struck the first readers.

Historian of ideas Carolina Armenteros, who has written four works on Maistre, characterized the prose style as follows:

The Considérations sur la France (1797) uses the ancient technique of deinôsis, a Greek term signifying the religious horror that mortals experience in the presence of a terrifying divinity. The imprecations, vociferations and vituperations of his style are so many codes of his anti-modernity.

According to French historian Pierre Glaudes, Maistre's appropriation of Burke's notion of the sublime provided him with both an interpretive key for understanding the Revolution and a new rhetoric for elucidating and imposing its transcendent meaning. In this way, politics and æsthetics are portrayed as intimately bound together.

== See also ==
- Conservatism in France

== Sources ==
- Bertrin, George (1913). "Joseph-Marie, Comte de Maistre" . In Herbermann, Charles (ed.). Catholic Encyclopedia. New York: Robert Appleton Company.
- Lebrun, Richard (1967). "Joseph de Maistre, how Catholic a Reaction?" (PDF). CCHA Study Sessions. 34: 29–45. Archived from the original (PDF) on 2007-01-07.
