= Reflections on the Revolution in France =

1790 political pamphlet by Edmund Burke

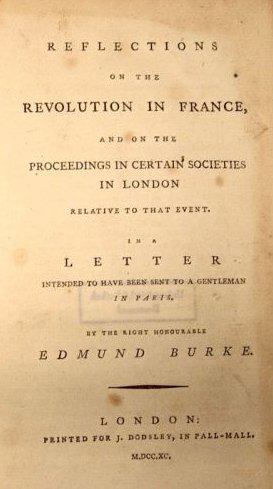
- Author: Edmund Burke
- Genre: Political theory
- Publisher: James Dodsley, Pall Mall, London
- Publication date: November 1790
- Publication place: Great Britain
- Media type: Pamphlet
- OCLC: 49294790
- Dewey Decimal: 944.04
- LC Class: DC150.B9
- Text: Reflections on the Revolution in France at Wikisource

Reflections on the Revolution in France (Note: Full title: Reflections on the Revolution in France, and on the Proceedings in Certain Societies in London Relative to That Event. In a Letter Intended to Have Been Sent to a Gentleman in Paris) is a political pamphlet written by the British statesman Edmund Burke and published in November 1790. It is fundamentally a contrast of the French Revolution to that time with the unwritten British Constitution and, to a significant degree, an argument with British supporters and interpreters of the events in France. One of the best-known intellectual attacks against the French Revolution, Reflections is a defining tract of modern conservatism as well as an important contribution to international theory. The Norton Anthology of English Literature describes Reflections as becoming the "most eloquent statement of British conservatism favoring monarchy, aristocracy, property, hereditary succession, and the wisdom of the ages." Above all else, it has been one of the defining efforts of Edmund Burke's transformation of "traditionalism into a self-conscious and fully conceived political philosophy of conservatism".

The pamphlet has not been easy to classify. Before seeing this work as a pamphlet, Burke wrote in the mode of a letter, invoking expectations of openness and selectivity that added a layer of meaning. Academics have had trouble identifying whether Burke, or his tract, can best be understood as "a realist or an idealist, Rationalist or a Revolutionist". Thanks to its thoroughness, rhetorical skill and literary power, it has become one of the most widely known of Burke's writings and a classic text in political theory. In the 20th century, it influenced a number of conservative intellectuals, who recast Burke's Whiggish arguments as a critique of Bolshevik programmes.

== Background ==
Burke served in the House of Commons of Great Britain, representing the Whig party, in close alliance with liberal politician Lord Rockingham. In Burke's political career, he vigorously defended constitutional limitation of the Crown's authority, denounced the religious persecution of Catholics in his native Ireland, voiced the grievances of Britain's American colonies, supported American Independence and vigorously pursued impeachment of Warren Hastings, the Governor-General of British India, for corruption and abuse of power. For these actions, Burke was widely respected by liberals in Great Britain, the United States and the European continent. Earlier in his career, Burke had championed many liberal causes and sided with the Americans in their war for independence. Thus, opponents and allies alike were surprised at the strength of his conviction that the French Revolution was "a disaster" and the revolutionists "a swinish multitude".

Soon after the fall of the Bastille in 1789, the French aristocrat Charles-Jean-François Depont asked his impressions of the Revolution and Burke replied with two letters. The longer, second letter, drafted after he read Richard Price's speech A Discourse on the Love of Our Country in January 1790, became Reflections on the Revolution in France. Published in November 1790, the work was an instant bestseller as thirteen thousand copies were purchased in the first five weeks and by the following September had gone through eleven editions. According to Stephen Greenblatt in The Norton Anthology of English Literature, "part of its appeal to contemporary readers lay in the highly wrought accounts of the mob's violent treatment of the French king and queen (who at the time Burke was writing were imprisoned in Paris...)." The French king and queen were executed three years later, in January and October 1793 respectively.

== Arguments ==
In the Reflections, Burke argued that the French Revolution would end disastrously because its abstract foundations, purportedly rational, ignored the complexities of human nature and society. He wrote that genuine equality must be judged by God and that liberty was a construct of the law and no excuse to do whatever one would like. In his opinion, the revolutionaries did not understand that "there are no rights without corresponding duties, or without some strict qualifications".

Burke focused on the practicality of solutions instead of ideas, writing: "What is the use of discussing a man's abstract right to food or to medicine? The question is upon the method of procuring and administering them. In this deliberation I shall always advise to call in the aid of the farmer and the physician, rather than the professor of metaphysics". Following St. Augustine and Cicero, he believed in "human heart"-based government. Nevertheless, he was both contemptuous and apprehensive of Enlightenment ideas from intellectuals such as David Hume, Edward Gibbon, Jean-Jacques Rousseau, Voltaire and Anne Robert Jacques Turgot; intellectuals who did not believe in a divine moral order and original sin. Burke said that society should be handled like a living organism and that people and society are limitlessly complicated, leading him to conflict with Thomas Hobbes' assertion that politics might be reducible to a deductive system akin to mathematics.

As a Whig, Burke expressly repudiated the belief in divinely appointed monarchic authority and the idea that a people have no right to depose an oppressive government. However, he advocated central roles for private property, tradition and prejudice (i.e. adherence to values regardless of their rational basis) to give citizens a stake in their nation's social order. He argued for gradual, constitutional reform, not revolution (in every case, except the most qualified case), emphasizing that a political doctrine founded upon abstractions such as liberty and the rights of man could be easily abused to justify tyranny. He saw inherited rights, restated in England from the Magna Carta to the Declaration of Right, as firm and concrete providing continuity (like tradition, prejudice and inheritable private property). By contrast, enforcement of speculative abstract rights might waver and be subject to change based on currents of politics. Instead, he called for the constitutional enactment of specific, concrete rights and liberties as protection against governmental oppression.

In the phrase, "[prejudice] renders a man's virtue his habit", Burke defends people's cherished, but untaught, irrational prejudices (the greater it behooved them, the more they cherished it). Because a person's moral estimation is limited, people are better off drawing from the "general bank and capital of nations and of ages" than from their own intellects.

Burke predicted that the Revolution's concomitant disorder would make the army "mutinous and full of faction" and then a "popular general", commanding the soldiery's allegiance, would become "master of your assembly, the master of your whole republic". Although he may have been thinking of Gilbert du Motier, Marquis de Lafayette, Napoleon fulfilled this prophecy on the 18th Brumaire, two years after Burke's death.

Most of the House of Commons disagreed with Burke and his popularity declined. As the French Revolution broke into factions, the Whig Party broke in two, namely the New Whig party and the Old Whig party. As founder of the Old Whigs, Burke always took the opportunity to engage in debate with the New Whigs about French Jacobinism.

After trying to loosen the Protestant minority's control of Irish government, he was voted out of the House of Commons with a great pension. He later adopted French and Irish children, believing himself correct in rescuing them from government oppression. Before dying, he ordered his family to bury him secretly, believing his cadaver would be a political target for desecration should the Jacobins prevail in England.

== Intellectual influence ==
Reflections on the Revolution in France was widely read upon publication in 1790. However, Burke's soft treatment of the French royal family alienated some British audiences. His political opponents speculated that Burke was mentally unwell, or was a secret Catholic outraged by the Dechristianization of France during the French Revolution. Critics responded swiftly, beginning with A Vindication of the Rights of Men (1790) by Mary Wollstonecraft and soon followed by the Rights of Man (1791) by Thomas Paine. Nonetheless, Burke's work became popular with George III and the Savoyard philosopher Joseph de Maistre.

In Wales, Burke’s work widely circulated via bilingual channels. The term “Swinish multitude” appeared in Welsh as “lliaws mochaidd” (a lot of pigs) in "Y Geirgrawn" (1796), and William Richards’s English-Welsh dictionary represented it as “y fochaidd werin” (the peasant pig), while criticising Burke as a "placeman". The evidence of early Welsh reception of Reflections on the Revolution in France (and other works) through translation and lexicography has been used by scholars such as Hywel Davies to argue against the French Revolution having directly affected 1790s contemporary Welsh politics and identity. Rather, Davies states that English reactionary, conservative counter-thought, such as Reflections, did so to a greater extent.

Historically, Reflections on the Revolution in France became the founding philosophic opus of conservatism when some of Burke's predictions occurred, namely when the Reign of Terror under the new French Republic executed thousands (including many nuns and clergy) from 1793 to 1794 to purge so-called counter-revolutionary elements of society. In turn, that led to the political reaction of General Napoleon Bonaparte's government which appeared to some to be a military dictatorship. Burke had predicted the rise of a military dictatorship and that the revolutionary government instead of protecting the rights of the people would be corrupt and violent.

In the 19th century, positivist French historian Hippolyte Taine repeated Burke's arguments in Origins of Contemporary France (1876–1885), namely that centralisation of power is the essential fault of the Revolutionary French government system; that it does not promote democratic control; and that the Revolution transferred power from the divinely chosen aristocracy to an "enlightened" heartless elite more incompetent and tyrannical than the aristocrats.

In the 20th century, Western conservatives applied Burke's anti-revolutionary Reflections to popular revolutions, thus establishing Burke's iconic political value to conservatives. For example, Friedrich Hayek, a noted Austrian economist, acknowledged an intellectual debt to Burke. Christopher Hitchens wrote that the "tremendous power of the Reflections lies" in being "the first serious argument that revolutions devour their own children and turn into their own opposites".

However, historians have regarded Burke's arguments as inconsistent with the actual history of the events. Despite being the most respected conservative historian of the events, Alfred Cobban acknowledged that Burke's pamphlet in so far as it "deals with the causes of the Revolution [...] they are not merely inadequate, but misleading" and that its main success is as a "violent parti pris". Cobban notes that Burke was extremely well informed on America, Ireland and India, but in the case of the French Revolution relied on weak information and poor sources and as a result his thesis does not cohere to the ground reality of France at the onset of the Revolution, where the situation was indeed dire enough to sweep existing institutions. Cobban concludes: "As literature, as political theory, as anything but history, his Reflections is magnificent".

In 2020, Reflections on the Revolution in France was banned in China, as part of the Chinese Communist Party's wider censorship of certain books under Xi Jinping's general secretaryship.

== Quotes from Reflections on the Revolution in France ==
All circumstances taken together, the French revolution is the most astonishing that has hitherto happened in the world. The most wonderful things are brought about in many instances by means the most absurd and ridiculous; in the most ridiculous modes; and apparently, by the most contemptible instruments. Every thing seems out of nature in this strange chaos of levity and ferocity, and of all sorts of crimes jumbled together with all sorts of follies.

In viewing this tragi-comic scene, the most opposite passions necessarily succeed, and sometimes mix with each other in the mind; alternate contempt and indignation; alternate laughter and tears; alternate scorn and horror.

A spirit of innovation is generally the result of a selfish temper and confined views. People will not look forward to posterity, who never look backward to their ancestors.

They are surrounded by an army not raised either by the authority of their crown or by their command, and which, if they should order to dissolve itself, would instantly dissolve them. Our political system is placed in a just correspondence and symmetry with the order of the world, and with the mode of existence decreed to a permanent body composed of transitory parts; wherein, by the disposition of a stupendous wisdom, moulding together the great mysterious incorporation of the human race, the whole, at one time, is never old, or middle-aged, or young, but in a condition of unchangeable constancy, moves on through the varied tenour of perpetual decay, fall, renovation, and progression. Thus, by preserving the method of nature in the conduct of the state, in what we improve we are never wholly new; in what we retain we are never wholly obsolete.

If civil society be made for the advantage of man, all the advantages for which it is made become his right. [...] Men have a right to [...] justice; as between their fellows, whether their fellows are in politic function or in ordinary occupation. They have a right to the fruits of their industry; and to the means of making their industry fruitful. They have a right to the acquisitions of their parents; to the nourishment and improvement of their offspring; to instruction in life, and to consolation in death.

All the pleasing illusions, which made power gentle, and obedience liberal, which harmonized the different shades of life, and which, by a bland assimilation, incorporated into politics the sentiments which beautify and soften private society, are to be dissolved by this new conquering empire of light and reason. All the decent drapery of life is to be rudely torn off.

Where trade and manufactures are wanting to a people, an the spirit of nobility and religion remains, sentiment supplies, and not always ill supplies their place; but if commerce and the arts should be lost in an experiment to try how well a state may stand without these old fundamental principles, what sort of a thing must be a nation of gross, stupid, ferocious, and at the same time, poor and sordid barbarians, destitute of religion, honor, or manly pride, possessing nothing at present, and hoping for nothing hereafter? I wish you may not be going fast, and by the shortest cut, to that horrible and disgustful situation. Already there appears a poverty of conception, a coarseness and vulgarity in all the proceedings of the assembly and of all their instructors. Their liberty is not liberal. Their science is presumptuous ignorance. Their humanity is savage and brutal.

Society is indeed a contract. Subordinate contracts for objects of mere occasional interest may be dissolved at pleasure – but the state ought not to be considered as nothing better than a partnership agreement in a trade of pepper and coffee, calico or tobacco, or some other such low concern, to be taken up for a little temporary interest, and to be dissolved by the fancy of the parties. It is to be looked on with other reverence; because it is not a partnership in things subservient only to the gross animal existence of a temporary and perishable nature. It is a partnership in all science; a partnership in all art; a partnership in every virtue, and in all perfection. As the ends of such a partnership cannot be obtained in many generations, it becomes a partnership not only between those who are living, but between those who are living, those who are dead, and those who are to be born.

"People who never look back to their ancestors will not look forward to posterity".

"You will observe that from Magna Charta to the Declaration of Right it has been the uniform policy of our constitution to claim and assert our liberties as an entailed inheritance derived to us from our forefathers, and to be transmitted to our posterity — as an estate specially belonging to the people of this kingdom, without any reference whatever to any other more general or prior right. By this means our constitution preserves a unity in so great a diversity of its parts. We have an inheritable crown, an inheritable peerage, and a House of Commons and a people inheriting privileges, franchises, and liberties from a long line of ancestors."

“Better to be despised for too anxious apprehensions, than ruined by too confident a security.”

== See also ==
- Considerations on France (1796) by Joseph de Maistre

== Bibliography ==
- Armitage, Dave (2000). "Edmund Burke and Reason of State" (PDF). Journal of the History of Ideas. 61 (4). University of Philadelphia Press: 617–634. doi:10.1353/jhi.2000.0033. S2CID 171026778.
- Bruyn, Frans De (2001). "Anti-Semitism, Millenarianism, and Radical Dissent in Edmund Burke's Reflections on the Revolution in France". Eighteenth-Century Studies. 34 (4). Johns Hopkins University Press: 577–600. doi:10.1353/ecs.2001.0040. S2CID 162166315.
- Cobban, Alfred (1968). Aspects of the French Revolution. New York: George Braziller.
- Hampsher-Monk, Ian (2005). "Edmund Burke's Changing Justification for Intervention". The Historical Journal. 48 (1). Cambridge University Press: 65–100. doi:10.1017/s0018246x04004224. S2CID 145680137.
- Mazlish, Bruce (1958). "The Conservative Revolution of Edmund Burke". The Review of Politics. 20 (1). Cambridge University Press: 21–23. doi:10.1017/s0034670500020842. S2CID 144225315.
- Macpherson, C. R. (1980). Burke. New York: Hilland Wang.
- Spinner, Jeff (1991). "Constructing Communities: Edmund Burke on Revolution". Polity. 23 (3). Palgrave Macmillan Journals: 395–421. doi:10.2307/3235133. JSTOR 3235133. S2CID 147079449.
