= Rodolphe de Maistre =

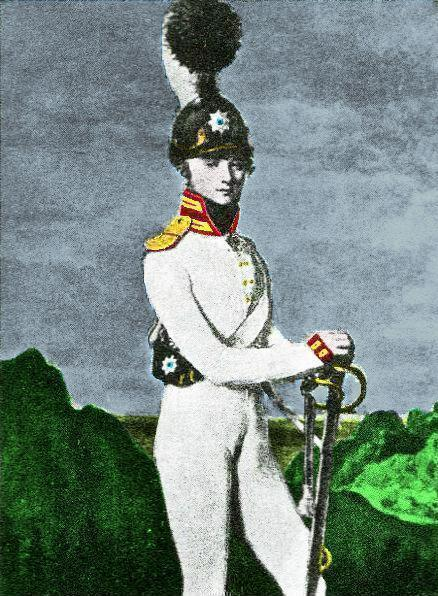
- Born: 22 September 1789; Chambery
- Died: 5 February 1866 (aged 76); Turino
- Occupation: Military officer
- Father: Joseph de Maistre

Rodolphe de Maistre (born 22 September 1789 in Chambéry, Savoy, died near Turin, 5 February 1866) was a military officer who fought for the Russian Empire at the battles of Friedland (1807), Smolensk, Moskova (Borodino), Bérézina (1812), Dresde, Leipzig (1813).

He then served as General of the garrison of Genoa, and Governor of Nice (today in France), for the King of Sardinia.

He was the son of the philosopher Joseph de Maistre, author of the St Petersburg Dialogues.
