= An Examination of the Philosophy of Bacon =

Philosophical critique of Francis Bacon

- Author: Joseph de Maistre
- Original title: Examen de la philosophie de Bacon
- Language: French
- Genre: Philosophy of science · History of science · Epistemology · Metaphysics
- Publication date: 1836
- English publication date: 1998

An Examination of the Philosophy of Bacon (French: Examen de la Philosophie de Bacon) is a posthumous work by Savoyard philosopher Joseph de Maistre, analyzing and criticizing the philosophy of Francis Bacon. It was published in 1836 and translated into English by Richard Lebrun in 1998.

== Thesis ==
Maistre considers Bacon to be the fountainhead of a destructive rationalistic ideology, blaming him for much of the scientism and atheism of the Age of Enlightenment. The argumentation against Bacon's philosophy is based on Maistre's epistemology first enunciated in the St Petersburg Dialogues (1819), according to which science depends on the innate ideas that are common to all human minds. Without such first principles, Maistre argues, experiments would be useless because there would be no basis for judging their validity. Maistre also argues that genius plays a pivotal role in great scientific discoveries, as demonstrated by inspired intellects such as Johannes Kepler, Galileo Galilei, and Isaac Newton, contrary to Bacon's theory about conforming to a mechanistic method.

== Reception ==
Although not as well known as some of Maistre's other works, its importance has long been recognized in France. Augustin Bonnetty remarked that "it would perhaps be necessary to go back to Pascal's Lettres provinciales to find a more severe, more mocking, more pointed critique." Gustave Flaubert quoted a few sentences from the work in his novel Bouvard et Pécuchet (1881)—a critique of bourgeoisie society:

“Bacon est absolument dépourvu de l’esprit d’analyse; non seulement ne savait pas résoudre les questions, mais ne savait pas même les poser. // Bacon, absolutely destitute of the spirit of analysis, not only did not know how to resolve questions, but did not even know how to pose them.”

“Bacon, man étranger à toutes les sciences et dont toutes les idées fondamentales étaient fausses. // Bacon, a man foreign to all sciences and whose fundamental ideas were false to the point of ridiculousness!”

Charles Augustin Sainte-Beuve, one of the most distinguished literary critics in nineteenth-century France, thought that Maistre's chapters on final causes and on the union of religion and science contained "certainly some of the finest pages that have ever been written in a human language."

Scholars have also claimed that Maistre's work anticipated the philosophy of modern science. According to Frederick Holdsworth, Maistre described for the first time many of the principles on which modern scientific method is based on such matters as the nature of causality, the inevitable human-centeredness of all scientific understanding, the role of intuition in scientific discovery, and the inescapability of metaphysical considerations. Larry Siedentop concluded that Maistre reached "important and original conclusions about scientific method – conclusions which have since been accepted by the philosophy of science." Owen Bradley claims that "Maistre's critique of Enlightenment notions of science is significant in its own right as a highly modern approach to the history of science."
