= Joseph de Maistre's Life, Thought, and Influence =

2001 book edited by Richard Lebrun

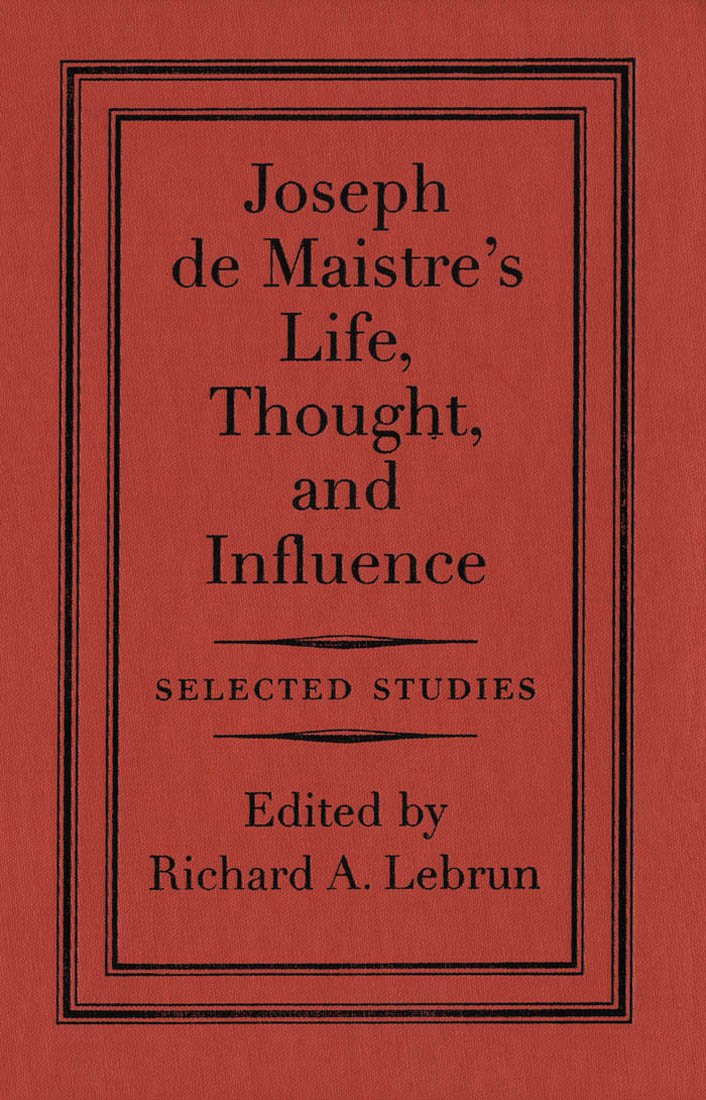
- Author: Richard Lebrun (editor)
- Language: English
- Publisher: McGill–Queen's University Press
- Publication date: 8 October 2001
- Publication place: United States
- Pages: 344
- ISBN: 9780773522886

Joseph de Maistre's Life, Thought, and Influence: Selected Studies is an anthology about the Savoyard diplomat and philosopher Joseph de Maistre. It was edited by Richard Lebrun for McGill–Queen's University Press, which published it in 2001. It includes chapters about Maistre's life, career, theories on religion, politics and language, relation to contemporaries and international legacy.

== Contents ==
- "Introduction" by Richard Lebrun
- "The Roads of Exile, 1792–1817" by Jean-Louis Darcel
- "The Apprentice Years of a Counter-Revolutionary: Joseph de Maistre in Lausanne, 1793–1797" by Jean-Louis Darcel
- "Joseph de Maistre and the House of Savoy: Some Aspects of his Career" Jean-Louis Darcel
- "Maistre's Theory of Sacrifice" by Owen Bradley
- "Joseph de Maistre Economist" by Jean Denizet
- "Joseph de Maistre's Theory of Language: Language and Revolution" by Benjamin Thurston
- "Joseph de Maistre, New Mentor of the Prince: Unveiling the Mysteries of Political Science" by Jean-Louis Darcel
- "Joseph de Maistre's Catholic Philosophy of Authority" by Jean-Yves Pranchère
- "Joseph de Maistre and Edmund Burke: A Comparison" by Richard Lebrun
- "Maistre’s Twin? Louis de Bonald and the Counter-Enlightenment" by W. Jay Reedy
- "The Social Bond according to the Catholic Counter-Revolution: Maistre and Bonald" by Jean-Yves Pranchère
- "Joseph de Maistre and Carl Schmitt" by Graeme Garrard
- "Joseph de Maistre's Works in Russia: A Look at Their Reception" by Vera Miltchyna
- "Joseph de Maistre in the Anglophone World" by Richard Lebrun
- "The Persistence of Maistrian Thought" by Jean-Yves Pranchère
