= Neo-ultramontanism =

Roman Catholic papal infallibility belief

Neo-ultramontanism (or new ultramontanism) is the belief of certain Roman Catholics, primarily during the period immediately prior to the First Vatican Council, that papal infallibility was not restricted to a small number of papal statements but applied ipso facto (by virtue of being said by the Pope) to all papal teachings and statements.

Although few contemporary historians of the Roman Catholic Church distinguish between neo-ultramontanism and the more moderate ultramontanism of mainstream nineteenth-century Roman Catholicism, there were substantial differences between the two. The neo-ultramontanes wanted to pass by decree the most extreme definition of papal infallibility possible and did not wish for debates at all. They were, indeed, regarded as imprudent by more moderate ultramontanists who won the debate at the First Vatican Council.

== Origins and history ==
Neo-ultramontanism as a movement dates back to the writings of Joseph de Maistre, who in Du Pape ("The Pope"), argued essentially that what the Pope says is true to the exclusion of all other contrary truths. In the following period the ideals of neo-ultramontanism were formulated – though for many years in a quite incoherent manner – to free the Roman Catholic Church from the power of the secular state. Many who know about it see neo-ultramontanism as the most extreme reaction to the ideas promoted by the French Revolution, which made them turn to the papacy as the last bastion of truth. Its main bastion in these early days was the French journal Univers under the leadership of Louis Veuillot.

The term neo-ultramontanism, however, was not coined until 1893, when it was used by one of its strongest adherents, the British lay convert William George Ward and adopted by Cardinal Henry Manning. Cuthbert Butler, an historian of the First Vatican Council, summarized Ward's viewpoint:

He held that the infallible element of bulls, encyclicals, etc., should not be restricted to their formal definitions but ran through the entire doctrinal instructions; the decrees of the Roman Congregation, if adopted by the Pope and published with his authority, thereby were stamped with the mark of infallibility, in short "his every doctrinal pronouncement is infallibly rendered by the Holy Ghost".

During the lead-up to the First Vatican Council the neo-ultramontanes were very well organized and included within their ranks a substantial portion of the 601 bishops who voted on the question of infallibility at that council. They were concentrated in Western Europe, but did not manage to win the debate, which liberal historians attribute to their lack of theological and historical understanding of how the doctrine of infallibility was first proposed.

After the First Vatican Council, neo-ultramontanism as a semi-organized movement declined as its chief adherents were not replaced. Pope Leo XIII never attempted to exercise infallibility and by the time of his death all the neo-ultramontane publications had been closed down or had changed their views on what was now "history" (the First Vatican Council and the debates within it). However, some liberal theologians and historians have argued since the beginning of John Paul II's papacy that a view of papal infallibility analogous to that proposed by neo-ultramontanes has made a comeback. This has been especially true since the controversy surrounding the aftermath of Ordinatio sacerdotalis in 1994 and "On Not Inventing Doctrine", Nicholas Lash's article in The Tablet about that letter published a year and a half later. However, neither Pope John Paul II nor Pope Benedict XVI have cited nineteenth-century neo-ultramontanists as influences on their theological or ecclesiological viewpoints.

== Criticism of the term ==
Many Catholic Church historians are critical of the term neo-ultramontanism because they believe that it fails to clarify clearly the position of those who advocated it and that it was never in any general use, always being confined to a few of either its staunchest advocates or to strong opponents of its beliefs like the Lord Acton.

== See also ==
- Papal primacy
- Papal supremacy
- Traditionalist Catholicism
- Unam sanctam
