= Neo-Catholic =

Neo-Catholicism may refer to:

- Liberal Catholicism, an intellectual movement in French Catholicism in the wake of the French revolution
- Mainstream Catholicism after Vatican I (1870) from the point of view of the Old Catholic Church
- Mainstream Catholicism after the 2nd Vatican Council from the perspective of Traditionalist Catholics
- Neocatólicos, a counter-revolutionary political tradition, faction or movement in late 19th-century Spain
- Neo-Catholicism, abbreviated as Neo-C, a fictional representation of Catholicism in the science-fiction television series Altered Carbon and the book it is based on

== See also ==
- Neo-ultramontanism
- Neo-scholasticism (Neo-Thomism)
- Neo-Christian (Swedenborgianism)
