= Clerical philosophers =

Group of Catholic intellectuals

Clerical philosophers is the name given to a group of Catholic intellectuals, namely the Savoyard Joseph de Maistre, and the French Louis de Bonald and François-René de Chateaubriand, who sought to undermine the intellectual foundations of the French Revolution in reaction to what they perceived as its overt anti-religious and destructive character.

== Aftermath of the French Revolution ==
In the Revolution's aftermath, France was continually wracked with the quarrels between the right-wing Bourbonist restorationists and left-wing Revolutionaries; herein arose the clerical philosophers whose answer was restoring monarchy and reinstalling the Roman Catholic Church as the official State Church of France.

== Return to a Golden Age ==
Since then, France's history features said recurrent patterns of political thought, with reactionaries longing for an erstwhile pre-Revolutionary Golden Age, by repudiating two centuries of progress since the Revolution in 1789. (see Action Française)

== Joseph de Maistre ==
Joseph de Maistre, even though not a French citizen (being a magistrate and diplomat of the Kingdom of Piedmont-Sardinia), is the Bourbon Restoration's philosopher of reaction; his writings are authoritative sources of reactionary ideas advocating authoritarian government of a society classified according to a divinely-established "natural inequality". A pessimist about Man's nature, he repudiated the Revolution's humanist principles and socio-political institutions, because they originated in the anti-Christian Enlightenment, saying it was God who created the State, not a human social contract; societal order and stability are paramount, yet feasible only via obedience to a Church-anointed absolute monarch; and that civil law expressed custom and tradition, not the fickle opinion of the people. In the book, Examen de la philosophie de Bacon (An Examination of the Philosophy of Bacon), he attacked Francis Bacon's materialism.

== Louis de Bonald ==
Louis de Bonald was of the same cloth as De Maistre. He buttressed the convictions of already-convinced reactionaries; attacked the Revolution for creating individualism and centralization in government; championed absolute monarchy and the Church as the only means of securing domestic tranquility. He proposed restoring the mediaeval guild system to ensure the rights (and obligations) of every French social class.

== François-René de Chateaubriand ==
François-René de Chateaubriand was an eloquent writer described as Rousseau in Catholic (black) dress and is considered the first Romantic writer. Although not reactionary per se, he accepted Revolutionary change, but not its social principles. He mingled new institutions with old memories, traditions with ideals of the ancien régime, so in dressing the monarchic Restoration in Catholic trappings, he sought to the Bourbon Régime's stability via the people's devotion. Moreover, Chateaubriand wrote Christian-themed novels, such as Atala and Genie du Christianisme (The Genius of Christianity).

== Support for a conservative social order ==
Politically, they saw the Church as essential in maintaining a conservative social order and the Monarchy.
