= Carolina Armenteros =

Spanish intellectual historian

Carolina Armenteros is a Spanish intellectual historian of Europe specializing in the era of 1750–1914. Along with Richard Lebrun, she is one of the leading scholars of Joseph de Maistre. She has also published on gender studies and philosophy of religion.

She is educated at Stanford University and the University of Cambridge. She has taught and conducted research at the University of Cambridge, the Université Sorbonne Nouvelle, the American University of Paris, and the University of Groningen. She is the recipient of a British Academy Research Fellowship and of several Visiting Fellowships at Wolfson College, Cambridge. She currently directs the Center for European Studies at the Pontificia Universidad Católica Madre y Maestra in the Dominican Republic.

== Works ==
- Historicising the French Revolution. Cambridge Scholars Publishing. 2008. ISBN 9781847186409.
- The New Enfant du Siècle: Joseph de Maistre as a Writer. St. Andrews Studies in French History and Culture. 2010. ISBN 978-1-907548-00-0.
- The French Idea of History: Joseph de Maistre and his Heirs, 1794–1854. Cornell University Press. 2011. ISBN 0-8014-4943-X.
- Joseph de Maistre and his European Readers: From Friedrich von Gentz to Isaiah Berlin. Brill Publishers. 2011. ISBN 9789004193949.
- Joseph de Maistre and the Legacy of Enlightenment. The Voltaire Foundation. 2011. ISBN 9780729410083.
- Monarchy and Liberalism in Spain: The Building of the Nation-State, 1780-1931. Routledge. 2020. ISBN 9780367409906.
- Decolonialidad, emancipación y utopías en América Latina y el Caribe. 2022. ISBN 9798829936594.
- A Companion to Italian Constitutional History, 1804-1938: The House of Savoy and the Making of the Nation-State. Brill Academic Pub. 2023. ISBN 9789004537309.
