= Conservatism in France =

Conservatism in France refers to the political philosophy and ideology of conservatism as it has developed in France. It is usually based on upholding French culture, social hierarchy, and tradition. It stresses nationalism and has historically been associated with monarchism. It originated as a reactionary and counter-revolutionary movement in the Bourbon Restoration period following the French Revolution, and it has been a prominent ideology in France ever since.

== History ==
=== French revolution ===
Early conservatism in France focused on the rejection of the secularism of the French Revolution, support for the role of the Catholic Church, and the restoration of the monarchy. After the first fall of Napoleon in 1814, the House of Bourbon returned to power in the Bourbon Restoration. Louis XVIII and Charles X, brothers of the executed King Louis XVI, successively mounted the throne and instituted a conservative government intended to restore the proprieties, if not all the institutions, of the Ancien Régime. The Ultra-royalists were members of the nobility who strongly supported Roman Catholicism as the state religion of France, the Bourbon monarchy, social hierarchy, and census suffrage against popular will and the interests of the bourgeoisie and their liberal and democratic tendencies.

=== Post-revolution ===
After the July Revolution of 1830, Louis Philippe I, a member of the more liberal Orléans branch of the House of Bourbon, proclaimed himself as King of the French. The Second French Empire saw an Imperial Bonapartist regime of Napoleon III from 1852 to 1870. The Bourbon monarchist cause was on the verge of victory in the 1870s, but then collapsed because the proposed king, Henri, Count of Chambord, refused to fly the tri-coloured flag.

The turn of the century saw the rise of Action Française—an ultraconservative, reactionary, nationalist, and royalist movement that advocated a restoration of the monarchy. Its ideology was dominated by the precepts of Charles Maurras, following his adherence and his conversion of the movement's founders to royalism. The movement supported a restoration of the House of Bourbon and, after the 1905 law on the separation of Church and State, the restoration of Roman Catholicism as the state religion—all as rallying points in distinction to the Third Republic of France, which was considered corrupt and atheistic by many of its opponents.

=== World Wars ===
Tensions between Christian rightists and secular leftists heightened in the 1890–1910 era, but moderated after the spirit of unity in fighting World War I.

An authoritarian form of conservatism characterised the Vichy regime of 1940–1944 under Marshal Philippe Pétain with heightened antisemitism, opposition to individualism, emphasis on family life, and national direction of the economy. Révolution nationale was the official ideology promoted by the regime, which despite its name was reactionary rather than revolutionary as the program opposed almost every change introduced by the French Revolution.

=== Post-war era ===
Conservatism has been the major political force in France since World War II, although the number of conservative groups and their lack of stability defy simple categorisation. Following the war, conservatives supported Gaullist groups and parties, espoused nationalism, and emphasised tradition, social order, and the regeneration of France. Unusually, post-war conservatism in France was formed around the personality of a leader—army general and aristocrat Charles de Gaulle who led the Free French Forces against Nazi Germany—and it did not draw on traditional French conservatism, but on the Bonapartist tradition.

Gaullism in France continues under The Republicans (formerly Union for a Popular Movement), a party previously led by Nicolas Sarkozy, who served as President of France from 2007 to 2012 and whose ideology is known as Sarkozysm.

=== Contemporary politics ===
In 2021, the French intellectual Éric Zemmour founded the nationalist party Reconquête, which has been described as a more rightist version of Marine Le Pen's National Rally.

== See also ==
- Clerical philosophers
