= The Pope (book) =

1819 book by Joseph de Maistre

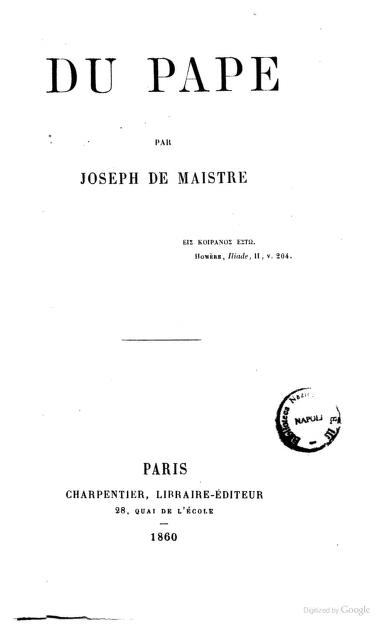
- Title page
- Author: Joseph de Maistre
- Original title: Du Pape
- Language: French
- Publication date: 1819
- OCLC: 16747422
- Dewey Decimal: 262.13
- LC Class: BX1805 .M32
- Text: The Pope at Internet Archive

The Pope (French: Du Pape), also titled On the Pope in English, is an 1819 book written by Savoyard philosopher Joseph de Maistre, which many consider to be his literary masterpiece.

== Sovereignty of papal power ==
Maistre argues that, in the Church, the Pope is sovereign, and that it is an essential characteristic of all sovereign power that its decisions should be subject to no appeal.

== Role of papal infallibility ==
Maistre mostly writes from the perspective of the ordinary magisterium having an infallible character, whereas the First Vatican Council defined a dogma on the infallibility of the extraordinary papal magisterium, in the limited circumstances when the Pope decides that it is time to define a dogma. Nevertheless, among modern theologians it is generally agreed that certain forms of the ordinary magisterium can at times be infallible, such as the bull Apostolicae curae or the encyclical Ordinatio sacerdotalis, as John Paul II explained in Ad Tuendam Fidem.

== Relations with temporal powers ==
Maistre examines the relations of the pope with temporal powers.

== Relations with schismatic Churches ==
As to the schismatic Churches, Maistre believed that they would fall into philosophic indifference as Catholicism was the only religion fully capable of being compatible with science.
