= St Petersburg Dialogues =

1821 book by Joseph de Maistre

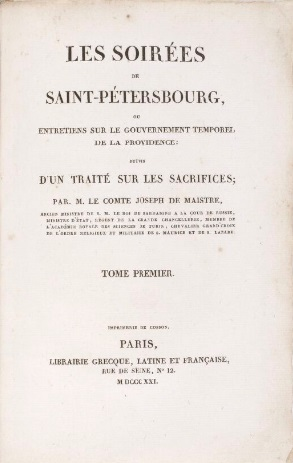
- Title page of volume one
- Author: Joseph de Maistre
- Original title: Les Soirées de Saint-Pétersbourg
- Translator: Richard Lebrun
- Language: French
- Genre: dialogue
- Publisher: Librairie grecque, latine et française
- Publication date: 1821
- Publication place: France
- English publication date: 1993

St Petersburg Dialogues: or Conversations on the Temporal Government of Providence (French: Les Soirées de Saint-Pétersbourg, ou Entretiens sur le Gouvernement Temporel de la Providence) is a 1821 book by the Savoyard diplomat and philosopher Joseph de Maistre.

== Summary ==
In a series of dialogues, three characters, called the Count, the Senator and the Chevalier, meet in Saint Petersburg and explore a range of subjects related to theodicy, punishment and epistemology. The book argues that the continuous blood sacrifice of men is a constant and fundamental law in all of human life and society.

A passage in the first dialogue attempts to explain the foundations of society by comparing executioners to the conventionally more honoured soldiers, maintaining that all society needs the final form of sovereignty that is provided by the executioner and which stops men ripping each other to pieces.

French	English
Est-ce un homme ? Oui : Dieu le reçoit dans ses temples et lui permet de prier. Il n’est pas criminel ; cependant aucune langue ne consent à dire, par exemple, qu’il est vertueux, qu’il est honnête homme, qu’il est estimable, etc. Nul éloge moral ne peut lui convenir, car tous supposent des rapports avec les hommes, et il n’en a point. Et cependant toute grandeur, toute puissance, toute subordination repose sur l’exécuteur : il est l’horreur et le lien de l’association humaine. Otez du monde cet agent incompréhensible ; dans l’instant même l’ordre fait place au chaos, les trônes s’abîment et la société disparaît. Dieu, qui est l’auteur de la souveraineté, l’est donc aussi du châtiment : il a jeté notre terre sur ces deux pôles: car Jêhovah est le maître des deux pôles, et sur eux il fait tourner le monde (Domini enim sunt cardines terrae et posuit super eos orbem).	Is he a man? Yes: God receives him in his temples and permits him to pray. He is not a criminal; yet no language will consent to say, for example, that he is virtuous, that he is an honest man, that he is estimable, etc. No moral praise can be applied to him, since all such praise presupposes relations with other men, and he has none. And yet all greatness, all power, all subordination depend upon the executioner: he is the horror and the bond of human association. Remove from the world this incomprehensible agent, and at that very instant order gives way to chaos, thrones collapse, and society disappears. God, who is the author of sovereignty, is therefore also the author of punishment: he has cast our world upon these two poles: for Jehovah is the master of the hinges of the earth, and upon them he has set the world (Domini enim sunt cardines terrae et posuit super eos orbem).

== Reception ==
St Petersburg Dialogues is Maistre's most famous and influential work. The scholar Mark Wegierski writes that it is "extraordinary" in its wide range, which includes "pointed criticisms of Locke and Voltaire, the beginnings of a logothetic linguistic theory, as well as such controversial passages as those in praise of the executioner, and on the divinity of war".

According to the Maistre scholar Carolina Armenteros, the essayistic style of the dialogues expresses an "organicism … opposed to the mechanistic rationalism of the Enlightenment," offering "a pre-romantic and imaginative ideal of the search for truth that springs from respect for variation and particularity … an ideal rooted in awe." Isaiah Berlin called the part about the executioner "the most famous passage in the whole of Maistre’s works".

== Sources ==
- Berlin, Isaiah (25–28 October 1965). The Second Onslaught: Joseph de Maistre and Open Obscurantism (PDF) (Speech). Two Enemies of the Enlightenment. Wolfson College, Oxford.
