= Joseph de Maistre =

Savoyard political philosopher (1753–1821)

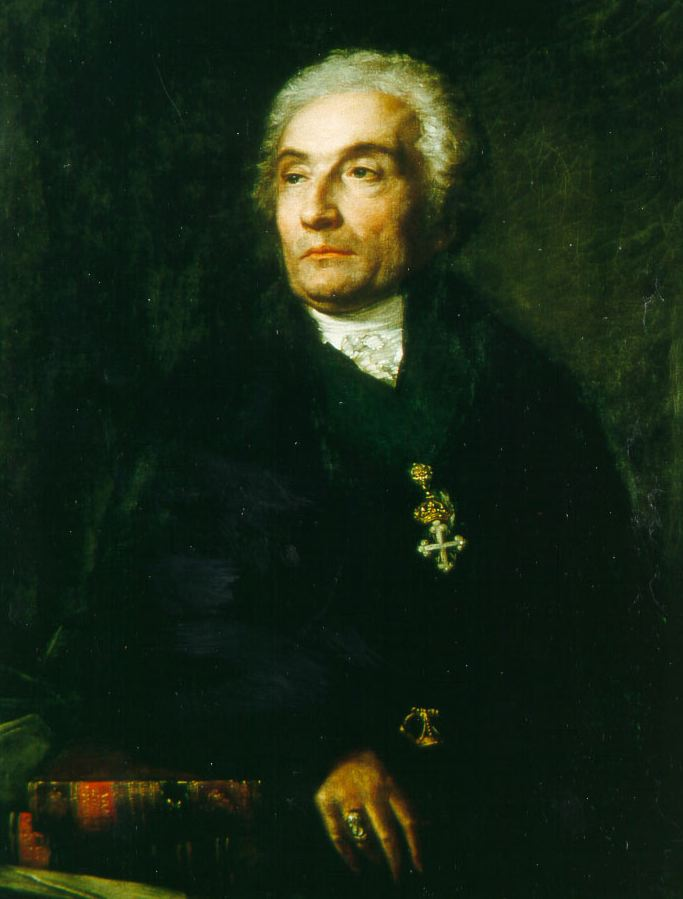
- Portrait of Maistre by von Vogelstein, c. 1810
- Born: 1 April 1753; Chambéry, Kingdom of Sardinia
- Died: 26 February 1821 (aged 67); Turin, Kingdom of Sardinia

Philosophical work
- Era: 18th-century philosophy
- Region: Western philosophy
- School: Conservatism; Traditionalism; Ultramontanism; Clericalism; Monarchism; Royalism; Medievalism; Mysticism; Counter-Enlightenment; Romanticism
- Main interests: Political philosophy; Political theology
- Notable works: Considerations on France On the Pope St Petersburg Dialogues
- Notable ideas: Providentialism; Necessity of sacrifice; Legitimacy of authority; Legitimacy of tradition

Joseph Marie, comte de Maistre (Note: Maistre is traditionally pronounced [mɛstʁ] (i.e. sounding the "s" and rhyming with bourgmestre); that is how it is usually heard at university and in historical movies (as in Sacha Guitry's 1948 film Le Diable boiteux). The pronunciation [mɛːtʁ] (rhymes with maître) is sometimes heard under the influence of the modernized pronunciation, adopted by some descendants (such as Patrice de Maistre)) (1 April 1753 – 26 February 1821), was a Savoyard lawyer, diplomat, and political philosopher. He is chiefly remembered as one of the intellectual forefathers of modern conservatism.

Born in the Kingdom of Sardinia, Maistre was noted for his advocacy of monarchism and social stratification in the period immediately following the French Revolution. French by language and culture, Maistre was nonetheless a subject of the King of Piedmont–Sardinia, whom he served in various government positions, including stints in the Savoy Senate (1787–1792), as ambassador to the Russian Empire (1803–1817), and as minister of state to the court in Turin (1817–1821). (Note: The issue of Maistre's national identity has long been contentious. Sources such as the Encyclopædia Britannica and the Catholic Encyclopedia identify Maistre as French by culture, if not by law. In 1802, after the invasion of Savoy and Piedmont by the armies of the French First Republic, Maistre had fled to Cagliari, the ancient capital of the Kingdom of Sardinia. The French authorities listed him as an émigré, subject to the confiscation of his properties and to punishment should he attempt to return to Savoy. According to his son Rodolphe, on that occasion Maistre wrote to the French ambassador to Naples arguing that "He had not been born French, and did not desire to become French, and that, never having set foot in the lands conquered by France, he could not have become French." — Œuvres complètes de Joseph de Maistre, Lyon, 1884, vol. I, p. XVIII. In 1860, Albert Blanc, professor of law at the University of Turin, in his preface to a collection of Maistre's diplomatic correspondence wrote that "this philosopher [Maistre] was a politician; this Catholic was an Italian; he foretold the destiny of the House of Savoy, he supported the end of the Austrian rule [of northern Italy], he has been, during this century, one of the first defenders of [Italian] independence." — Correspondance diplomatique de Joseph de Maistre, Paris, 1860, vol. I, pp. III-IV.)

A key figure of the Counter-Enlightenment and a precursor of Romanticism, Maistre regarded monarchy both as a divinely sanctioned institution and as the only stable form of government. Maistre argued that the rationalist rejection of Christianity was directly responsible for the Reign of Terror and the chaos that followed the Revolution of 1789 in France. He therefore called for the restoration of the House of Bourbon to the throne of France and for the ultimate authority of the Pope in both spiritual and temporal matters.

== Biography ==
Maistre was born in 1753 at Chambéry, Duchy of Savoy, at that time part of the Kingdom of Piedmont-Sardinia which was ruled by the House of Savoy from their capital in Turin. His family was of French and Italian origin. His grandfather André (Andrea) Maistre (1661–1722), whose parents François Maistre (1630–1674) and Margarita Maistre (née Dalmassi) (died 1717) originated in the County of Nice, had been a draper and councilman in Nice (then under the rule of the House of Savoy) and his father François-Xavier Maistre (1705–1789), who moved to Chambéry in 1740, became a magistrate and senator, eventually receiving the title of count from the King of Piedmont-Sardinia. His mother's family, whose surname was Desmotz, were from Rumilly. He was the eldest of ten surviving children and godfather to his younger brother, Xavier, who would become a major general and a popular writer of fiction.

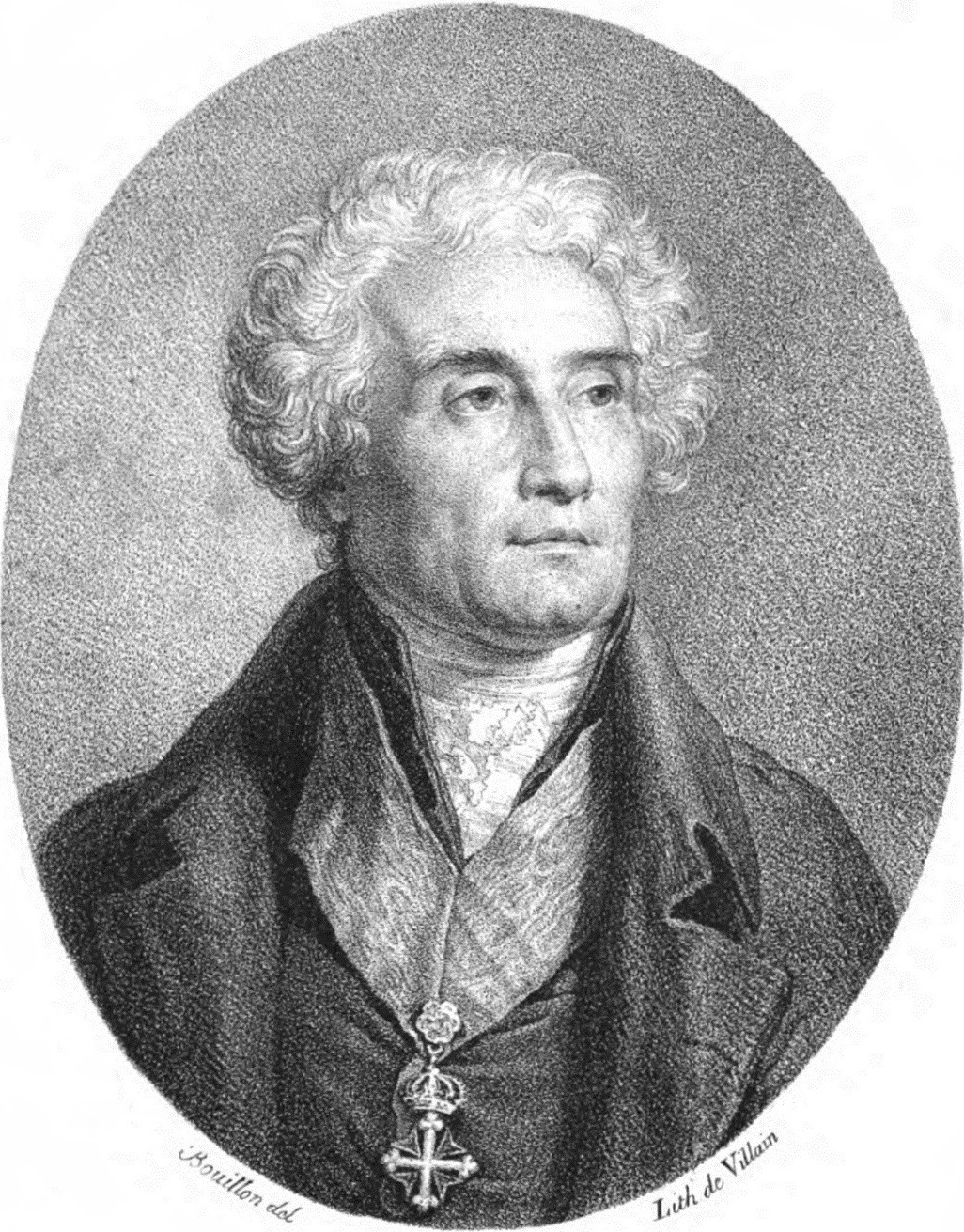
Stipple engraving of Maistre from a painting by Pierre Bouillon in which he is shown wearing the insignia of the Order of Saints Maurice and Lazarus

Maistre was likely educated by the Jesuits. He was a member of both a Jesuit organisation which held nine-day Catholic retreats and a member of the Penitents Noirs, a Catholic aristocratic confraternity which sat with criminals on the night before their execution, which may have given him an exposure to executions. After completing his training in the law at the University of Turin in 1774, he followed in his father's footsteps by becoming a senator in 1787. In his early years, Maistre was a liberal and supporter of Gallicanism. The philosopher and mystic Louis Claude de Saint-Martin was a major and lasting influence for Maistre. In one of his first public addresses Maistre praised the American Revolution proclaiming, "Liberty, insulted in Europe, has winged its flight to another hemisphere."

A member of the progressive Scottish Rite Masonic lodge at Chambéry from 1774 to 1790, Maistre originally favoured political reform in France, supporting the efforts of the magistrates in the Parlements to force King Louis XVI to convene the Estates General. As a landowner in France, Maistre was eligible to join that body and there is some evidence that he contemplated that possibility. Maistre was alarmed by the decision of the Estates-General to combine aristocracy, clergy and commoners into a single legislative body which became the National Constituent Assembly. After the passing of the August Decrees on 4 August 1789, he decisively turned against the course of political events in France.

Maistre fled Chambéry when it was taken by a French revolutionary army in 1792, but he was unable to find a position in the royal court in Turin and returned the following year. Deciding that he could not support the French-controlled regime, Maistre departed again, this time for Lausanne, Switzerland, where he discussed politics and theology at the salon of Madame de Staël, and began his career as a counter-revolutionary writer, with works such as Lettres d'un Royaliste Savoisien ("Letters from a Savoyard Royalist", 1793), Discours à Mme. la Marquise Costa de Beauregard, sur la Vie et la Mort de son Fils ("Discourse to the Marchioness Costa de Beauregard, on the Life and Death of her Son", 1794) and Cinq paradoxes à la Marquise de Nav... ("Five Paradoxes for the Marchioness of Nav...", 1795).

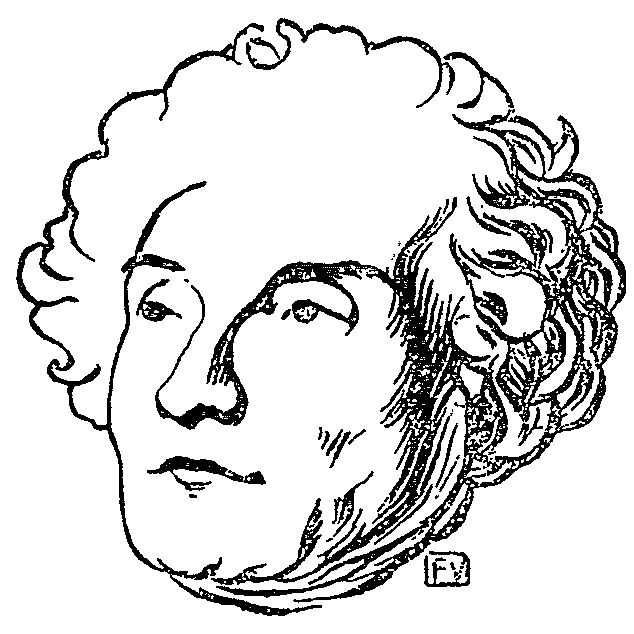
Portrait of Maistre by Swiss painter Félix Vallotton from La Revue blanche, 1895

From Lausanne, Maistre went to Venice and then to Cagliari, where the King of Piedmont-Sardinia held the court and the government of the kingdom after French armies took Turin in 1798. Maistre's relations with the court at Cagliari were not always easy. In 1802, he was sent to Saint Petersburg in Russia as ambassador to Tsar Alexander I. His diplomatic responsibilities were few and he became a well-loved fixture in aristocratic and wealthy merchant circles, converting some of his friends to Roman Catholicism and writing his most influential works on political philosophy. After the defeat of Napoleon and the restoration of the House of Savoy's dominion over Piedmont and Savoy under the terms of the Congress of Vienna, Maistre returned in 1817 to Turin and served there as magistrate and minister of state until his death. He died on 26 February 1821 and is buried in the Jesuit Church of the Holy Martyrs (Chiesa dei Santi Martiri).

=== Personal life ===
Maistre was married to Françoise de Morand de Saint-Sulpice (1759–1839), daughter of colonel of the Chablais regiment Jean-Pierre de Morand (1703–1759) and his wife Anne Marie Favier du Noyer (1732–1812), with whom he had three children: daughters Adèle (1787–1862), who married administrator Hippolyte Terray de Rozières (1774–1849) and Constance (1793–1882), who married soldier Eugène-Alexandre de Montmorency-Laval, fourth duc de Laval (1773–1851), and son Rudolphe (1789–1866), military officer who fought for the Russian Empire at the battles of Friedland, Smolensk, Moskova (Borodino), Bérézina, Dresden, and Leipzig.

== Intellectual thought ==
=== Politics ===
In Considérations sur la France ("Considerations on France", 1796), where he argued that the French Revolution was divine punishment for the promotion of Enlightenment thought by the Ancien Régime. In his short book Essay on the Generative Principle of Political Constitutions and other Human Institutions, Maistre repeats his argument from the Considerations that constitutions are not the product of human reason, but rather come from God, who through guided human actions slowly brings them to maturity, with written constitutions being "scraps of paper".

What was novel in Maistre's writings was not his enthusiastic defense of monarchical and religious authority per se, but rather his arguments concerning the practical need for ultimate authority to lie with an individual capable of decisive action as well as his analysis of the social foundations of that authority's legitimacy. In his own words which he addressed to a group of aristocratic French émigrés, "You ought to know how to be royalists. Before, this was an instinct, but today it is a science. You must love the sovereign as you love order, with all the forces of intelligence."

Despite his preference for monarchy, Maistre acknowledged that republics could be the superior form of government, depending on the situation and the people. Maistre also defended the government of the United States because its people were heirs to the democratic spirit of Great Britain, which he felt France lacked. He admired Edmund Burke and is supposed to have read English conservatives and has been linked to Burke's thought, although Burke and de Maistre are more often contrasted. Maistre regarded the constitution of the United Kingdom as "the most complex unity and the most propitious equilibrium of political powers that the world has ever seen".

=== Religion ===
Central to Maistre's rejection of the French Revolution was his belief that it was a rupture with the past and the Catholic Church, and that this rupture was the cause of scourges of the revolution such as Robespierre and Napoleon. After the appearance in 1816 of his French translation of Plutarch's treatise On the Delay of Divine Justice in the Punishment of the Guilty, Maistre published "On the Pope" in 1819, the most complete exposition of his religious conception of authority. According to Maistre, any attempt to justify government on rational grounds will only lead to unresolvable arguments about the legitimacy and expediency of any existing government and that this in turn will lead to violence and chaos. As a result, Maistre argued that the legitimacy of government must be based on compelling, but non-rational grounds which its subjects must not be allowed to question. Maistre went on to argue that authority in politics should derive from religion and that in Europe this religious authority must ultimately lie with the Pope.

Maistre criticised Enlightenment thinkers, particularly the French Encyclopaedists and Rousseau, for treating human beings as fundamentally rational and for grounding their theories in abstract reasoning rather than historical observation. To Rousseau's claim in The Social Contract that "man is born free, yet is everywhere in chains", Maistre retorts by asking why "sheep, who are born carnivorous, nevertheless everywhere nibble grass". After the Revolution, he became an ardent defender of his educators the Jesuits, increasingly associating the spirit of the Revolution with the Jesuits' traditional enemies, the Jansenists. He wrote Letters on the Spanish Inquisition which defended the inquisition.

=== Ethics ===
In addition to his voluminous correspondence, Maistre left two books that were published posthumously. Soirées de St. Pétersbourg (1821) is a theodicy in the form of a Platonic dialogue in which Maistre argues that evil exists because of its place in the divine plan, according to which the blood sacrifice of innocents returns men to God via the expiation of the sins of the guilty. Maistre sees this as a law of human history as unquestionable as it is mysterious. Yet contrary to the cliché that links reactionary thought to dogmatism, the fragmentary Soirées de St. Pétersbourg develop a train of thoughts, as Andreas Dorschel puts it, in a searching, tentative and even experimental fashion.

=== Science ===
Examen de la Philosophie de Bacon ("An Examination of the Philosophy of Bacon", 1836) is a critique of the thought of Francis Bacon, whom Maistre considers to be the fountainhead of the destructive rationalistic thought. Maistre also argued, romantically, that genius plays a pivotal role in great scientific discoveries, as demonstrated by inspired intellects such as Johannes Kepler, Galileo Galilei and Isaac Newton, contrary to Bacon's theory about conforming to a mechanistic method.

== Legacy and reputation ==
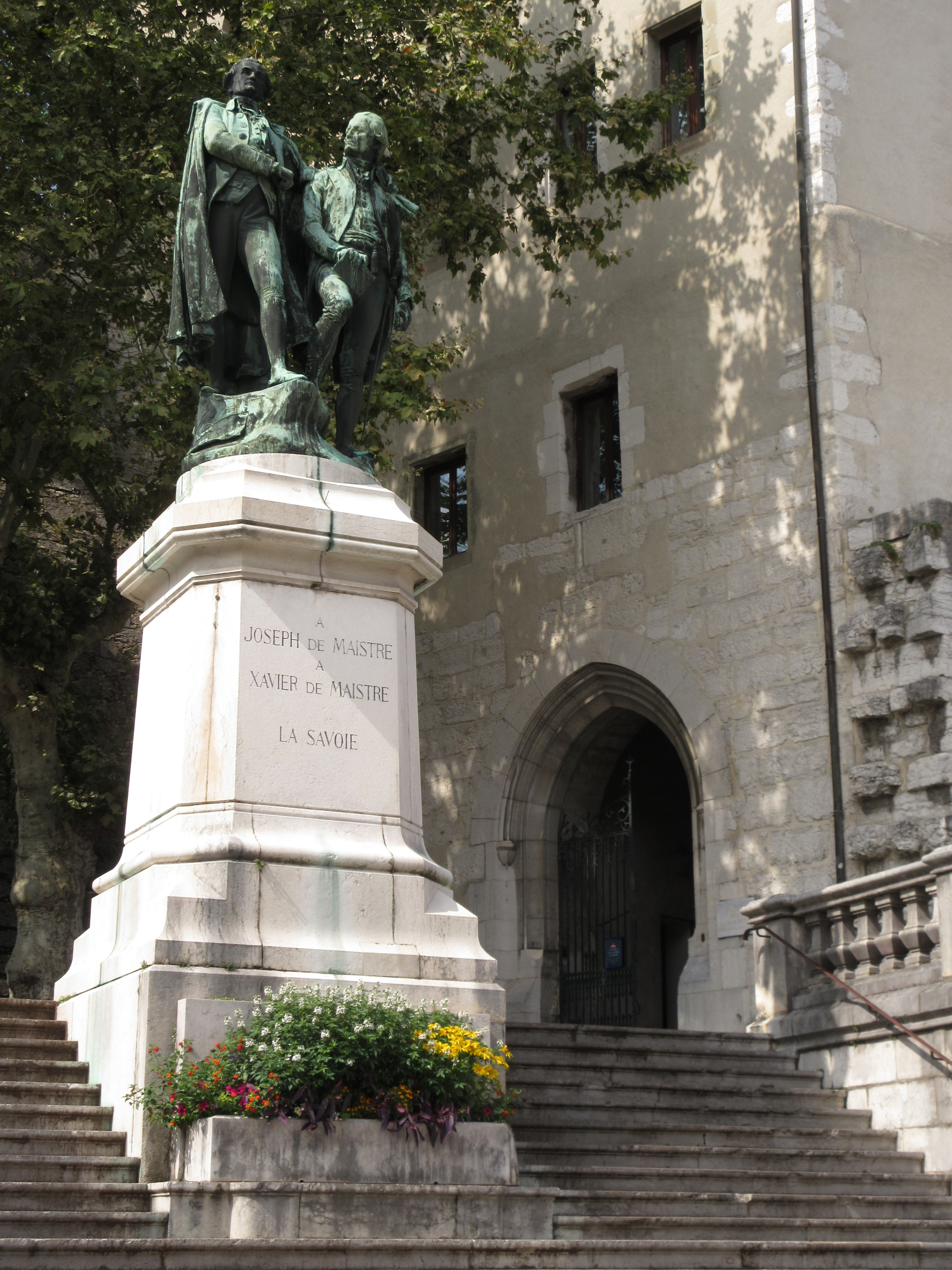
Statue of the Joseph and Xavier de Maistre brothers outside the old fortress in their hometown Chambéry

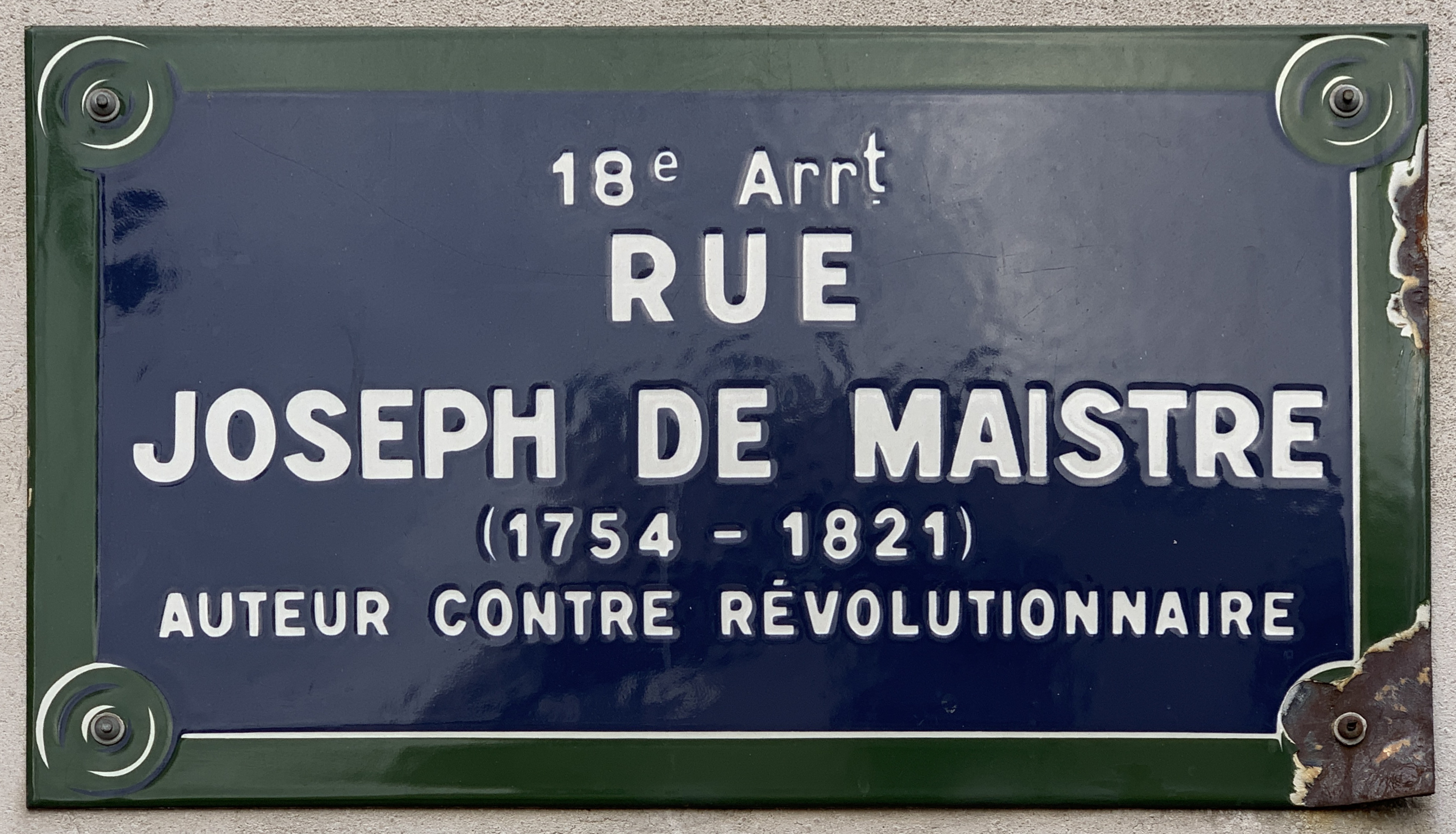
Street named after Joseph de Maistre in Montmartre, Paris

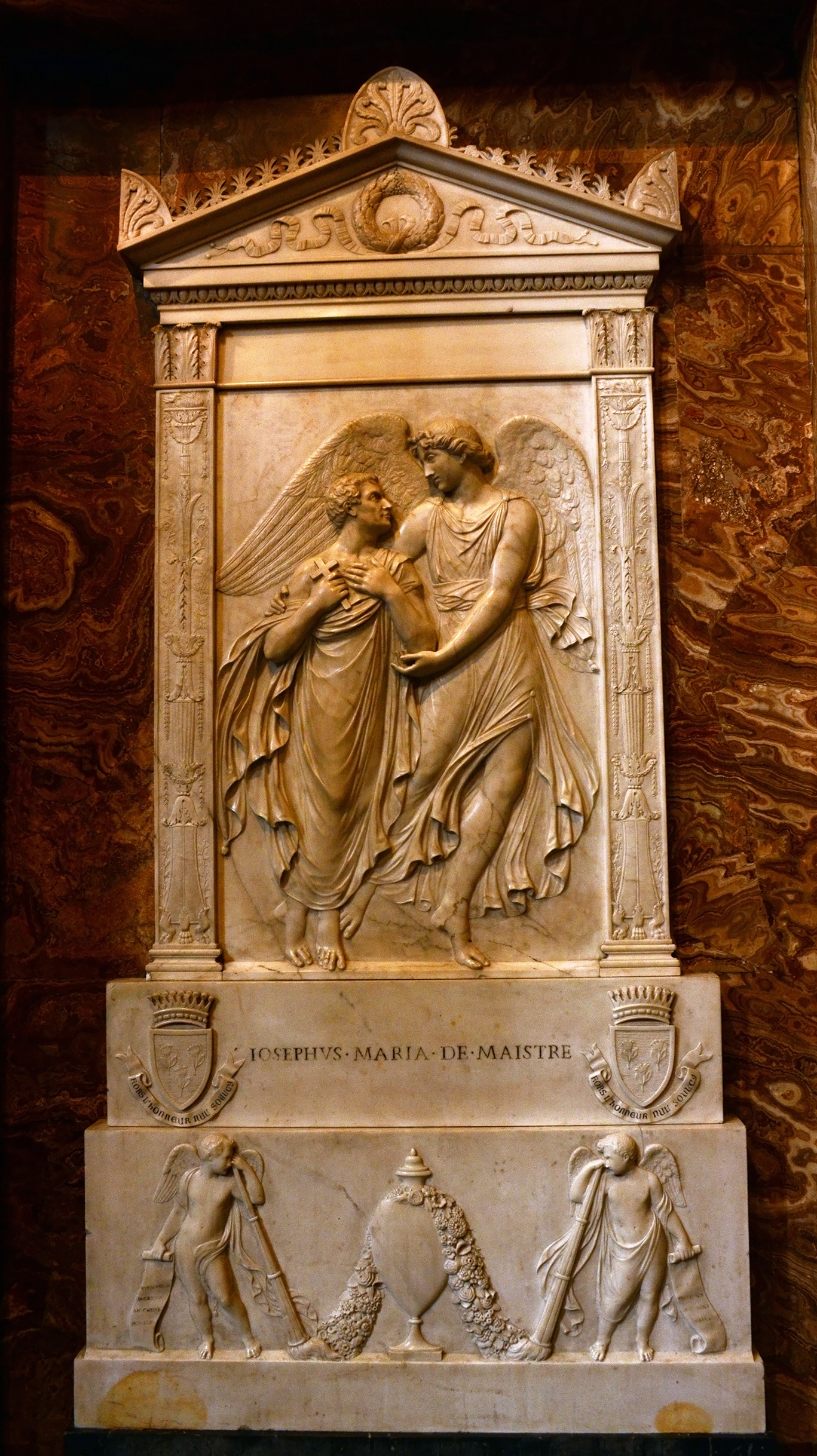
Joseph de Maistre's tomb at the Church of the Holy Martyrs in Turin

=== Political thought ===
Together with the Anglo-Irish statesman and philosopher Edmund Burke, Maistre is commonly regarded as one of the founders of European conservatism. Maistre exerted a powerful influence on the Spanish political thinker Juan Donoso Cortés, the French royalist Charles Maurras and his nationalist movement Action Française as well as the German philosopher of law Carl Schmitt.

However, according to Carolina Armenteros, who has written four books about Maistre, his writings influenced not only conservative political thinkers but also the utopian socialists. Early sociologists such as Auguste Comte and Henri de Saint-Simon explicitly acknowledged the influence of Maistre on their own thinking about the sources of social cohesion, legitimacy and political authority.

Maistre has been criticized by classical liberals. Literary critic Émile Faguet described Maistre as "a fierce absolutist, a furious theocrat, an intransigent legitimist, apostle of a monstrous trinity composed of pope, king and hangman, always and everywhere the champion of the hardest, narrowest and most inflexible dogmatism, a dark figure out of the Middle Ages, part learned doctor, part inquisitor, part executioner". Political historian Isaiah Berlin regarded Maistre as a proto-fascist in certain respects, arguing that he saw human society as dependent on the recognition and channelling of irrational and destructive impulses by governing elites. Nevertheless, Italian fascism openly rejected Maistre's reactionary conservatism.

Isaiah Berlin regarded Maistre as "the most brilliant and the most polemical of the critics of the philosophy that underlay the French Revolution" pointing to the modernity of much of his thinking. He also put him as one of the more important thinkers within the Counter-Enlightenment.

=== Literature ===
Maistre's skills as a writer and polemicist ensured that he continues to be read. Matthew Arnold, an influential 19th-century critic, wrote as follows while comparing Maistre's style with that of his Anglo-Irish counterpart Edmund Burke:

"Joseph de Maistre is another of those men whose word, like that of Burke, has vitality. In imaginative power he is altogether inferior to Burke. On the other hand, his thought moves in closer order than Burke's, more rapidly, more directly; he has fewer superfluities. Burke is a great writer, but Joseph de Maistre's use of the French language is more powerful, more thoroughly satisfactory, than Burke's use of the English. It is masterly; it shows us to perfection of what that admirable instrument, the French language, is capable."

The Catholic Encyclopedia of 1910 describes his writing style as "strong, lively, picturesque" and states that his "animation and good humour temper his dogmatic tone". George Saintsbury called him "unquestionably one of the greatest thinkers and writers of the eighteenth century". Although a political opponent, Alphonse de Lamartine called him the "Plato of the Alps". Admiring the splendour of his prose, Lamartine stated:

"That brief, nervous, lucid style, stripped of phrases, robust of limb, did not at all recall the softness of the eighteenth century, nor the declamations of the latest French books: it was born and steeped in the breath of the Alps; it was virgin, it was young, it was harsh and savage; it had no human respect, it felt its solitude; it improvised depth and form all at once ... That man was new among the enfants du siècle [children of the century]."

Maistre was an influence on the Romantic movement, which shared his political organicism and his opposition to rationalism, though Romantic attitudes towards the French Revolution varied individually and by place. Maistre is often referred to as a Romantic. Among those who admired him was the French poet Charles Baudelaire, who described himself a disciple of the Savoyard counter-revolutionary, claiming that Maistre had taught him how to think. Jules Barbey d'Aurevilly places Maistre first among his "prophets of the past" [les prophètes du passé] in his book by that name.

Prominent authors and intellectuals have mentioned Maistre in their literature. In Joris-Karl Huysmans' Decadent novel À rebours, Maistre is described as “that impervious sectarian, so magisterially, so pompously dull and empty." Walter Benjamin quotes at length from the Soirées de St. Petersbourg in his analysis of Baudelaire in The Arcades Project. At the beginning of Stendhal's novel Le Rouge et le Noir, Julien Sorel is described as knowing the New Testament and Maistre's Du Pape, "and [believing] in the one as little as in the other." Maistre's observations on Russian life, contained in his diplomatic memoirs and in his personal correspondence, were among Leo Tolstoy's sources for his novel War and Peace.

== Works ==
=== Original works ===
- Nobilis Ioseph Maistre Camberiensis ad i.u. lauream anno 1772. die 29. Aprilis hora 5. pomeridiana. [.] Turin, 1772. – Joseph de Maistre's decree thesis, kept in the National Library of the University of Turin.
- Éloge de Victor-Amédée III. Chambéry, 1775.
- Lettres d'un royaliste savoisien à ses compatriotes. 1793.
- Étude sur la souveraineté. 1794.
- De l'État de nature, ou Examen d'un écrit de Jean-Jacques Rousseau. 1795.
- Considérations sur la France. London [Basel], 1796.
- Intorno allo stato del Piemonte rispetto alla carta moneta. Turin; Aosta; Venice, 1797–1799.
- Essai sur le Principe Générateur des Constitutions Politiques. 1814 [1st. pub. 1809].
- Du Pape, Tome Second. 1819.
- De l'Église Gallicane. Édit. Rodolphe de Maistre. Lyon; Paris; Bois-le-Duc, 1821.
- Les Soirées de Saint-Pétersbourg ou Entretiens sur le Gouvernement Temporel de la Providence, Tome Second. Édit. Rodolphe de Maistre. 1821.
- Lettres à un Gentilhomme Russe sur l'Inquisition Espagnole. Édit. Rodolphe de Maistre. 1822.
- Examen de la Philosophie de Bacon, ou: l'on Traite Différentes Questions de Philosophie Rationnelle, Tome Second. Édit. Rodolphe de Maistre. 1836.
- Lettres et Opuscules Inédits du Comte Joseph de Maistre, Tome Second. Édit. Rodolphe de Maistre. Paris, 1853.
- Mémoires Politiques et Correspondance Diplomatique. Édit. Albert Blanc. Paris, 1859.

=== English translations ===
- Memoir on the Union of Savoy and Switzerland. 1795.
- O'Flaherty, Thomas J. (trans.). Letters on the Spanish Inquisition: A Rare Work, and the Best Which has Ever Appeared on the Subject.
  - 1st ed. 1830 (stereotype ed. 1843).
  - 2nd ed. 1850.
- Fletcher, John (trans.). Letters on the Spanish Inquisition. 1838.
- Little, Charles C., and James Brown (translators). Essay on the Generative Principle of Political Constitutions. 1847.
- Dawson, Æneas McD. (trans.). The Pope: Considered in His Relations with the Church, Temporal Sovereignties, Separated Churches and the Cause of Civilization. 1850.
- Dawson, Æneas McD. (trans.). Letters to a Russian Gentleman, on the Spanish Inquisition. 1851.
- In Menczer, Béla, 1962. Catholic Political Thought, 1789–1848. University of Notre Dame Press.
  - "Human and Divine Nomenclature", pp. 61–66.
  - "War, Peace, and Social Order", pp. 66–69.
  - "On Sophistry and Tyranny", pp. 69–71.
  - "Russia and the Christian West", pp. 72–76.
- Lively, Jack (ed.). The Works of Joseph de Maistre. Macmillan, 1965. ISBN 978-0805203042.
- Lebrun, Richard (ed.). Works of Joseph de Maistre:
  - The Pope. Howard Fertig, 1975. ISBN 978-1296620059.
  - St. Petersburg Dialogues. McGill-Queen's University Press, 1993. ISBN 978-0773509825.
  - Considerations on France. McGill-Queen's University Press, 1974, and Cambridge University Press, 1994. ISBN 978-0773501829.
  - Against Rousseau: "On the State of Nature" and "On the Sovereignty of the People". McGill-Queen's University Press, 1996. ISBN 978-0773514157.
  - Examination of the Philosophy of Bacon. McGill-Queen's University Press, 1998. ISBN 978-0773517271.
- Blum, Christopher Olaf (ed. and trans.). Critics of the Enlightenment. ISI Books, 2004. ISBN 978-1932236132.
  - 1798, "Reflections on Protestantism in its Relations to Sovereignty", pp. 133–56.
  - 1819, "On the Pope", pp. 157–96.
- Lively, Jack (ed.). The Generative Principle of Political Constitutions: Studies on Sovereignty, Religion, and Enlightenment. Transaction Publishers, 2011. ISBN 978-1412842655.
- In Blum, Christopher O. (ed. and trans.). Critics of the Enlightenment. Cluny Media, 2020. ISBN 978-1952826160.
  - 1797, "Considerations on France" (excerpt of first two sections), pp. 75–90.
  - 1819, "On the Pope", pp. 91–100.

== See also ==
- Louis Gabriel Ambroise de Bonald
- François-René de Chateaubriand
- Clerical philosophers
- Conservatism in France

== Sources ==
- Armenteros, Carolina (2007). "From Human Nature to Normal Humanity: Joseph de Maistre, Rousseau, and the Origins of Moral Statistics," Journal of the History of Ideas, Vol. 68, No. 1, pp. 107–30.
- Armenteros, Carolina (2007). "Parabolas and the Fate of Nations: Early Conservative Historicism in Joseph de Maistre's De la Souveraineté du Peuple," History of Political Thought, Vol. 28, No. 2, pp. 230–52.
- Armenteros, Carolina et al.. (2010). The New Enfant du Siècle: Joseph de Maistre as a Writer, St. Andrews Studies in French History and Culture.
- Armenteros, Carolina (2011). The French Idea of History: Joseph de Maistre and his Heirs, 1794–1854. Ithaca, NY and London: Cornell University Press ISBN 0-8014-4943-X
- Armenteros, Carolina; Lebrun, Richard (2011). Joseph de Maistre and his European Readers: From Friedrich von Gentz to Isaiah Berlin. Leiden and Boston: Brill.
- Armenteros, Carolina and Richard Lebrun (2011). Joseph de Maistre and the Legacy of Enlightenment. Oxford: The Voltaire Foundation.
- Austern, Donald M. (1974). The Political Theories of Edmund Burke and Joseph de Maistre as Representative of the Schools of Conservative Libertarianism and Conservative Authoritarianism. Amherst: Boston College Doctoral Thesis.
- Barbey D'Aurevilly, Jules (1889). "Joseph de Maistre". In: Les Prophètes du Passé. Paris: Calmann Lévy, pp. 50–69.
- Barthelet, Philippe (2005). Joseph de Maistre: Les Dossiers H. Geneva: L'Age d'Homme.
- Berlin, Isaiah (25–28 October 1965). The Second Onslaught: Joseph de Maistre and Open Obscurantism (PDF) (Speech). Two Enemies of the Enlightenment. Wolfson College, Oxford.
- Bertrin, George (1913). "Joseph-Marie, Comte de Maistre" . In Herbermann, Charles (ed.). Catholic Encyclopedia. New York: Robert Appleton Company.
- Blamires, Cyprian P. (1985). Three Critiques of the French Revolution: Maistre, Bonald and Saint-Simon. Oxford: Oxford University Doctoral Thesis.
- Bradley, Owen (1999). A Modern Maistre: The Social and Political Thought of Joseph de Maistre. Lincoln and London: University of Nebraska Press.
- Brandes, Georg (1903). "Joseph de Maistre." In: Main Currents in Nineteenth Century Literature, Vol. 3. The Reaction in France. New York: The Macmillan Company, pp. 87–112
- Buchanan, Patrick (2007). State of Emergency. New York: St. Martin's Griffin. ISBN 978-0-312-37436-5.
- Camcastle, Cara (2005). The More Moderate Side of Joseph de Maistre. Ottawa: McGill-Queen's University Press.
- Caponigri, A.R. (1942). Some Aspects of the Philosophy of Joseph de Maistre. PhD Thesis, University of Chicago.
- Comte, Auguste (1858). The Catechism of Positive Religion. Translated by Congreve, Richard. London: John Chapman. ISBN 978-1-108-00087-1 – via Internet Archive.
- Croce, Benedetto (1922). "Il Duca di Serra-Capriola e Giuseppe de Maistre". In: Archivio Storico per le Province Napoletane, Vol. XLVII, pp. 313–335.
- Edwards, David W. (1977). "Count Joseph de Maistre and Russian Educational Policy, 1803-1828", Slavic Review, Vol. 36, pp. 54–75.
- Eichrodt, Joan B. (1968). Orthodoxy, Autocracy, Nationality, and Joseph de Maistre. New York: Columbia University Master's Thesis.
- Faust, A.J. (1882). "Count Joseph de Maistre," The American Catholic Quarterly Review, Vol. VII, pp. 17–41.
- Fisichella, Domenico (1963). Giusnaturalismo e Teoria della Sovranità in Joseph de Maistre. Messina: Firenze (Rep. in Politica e Mutamento Sociale. Lungro di Cosenza: Costantino Marco Editore, 2002, pp. 191–243 ISBN 88-85350-97-6.)
- Fisichella, Domenico (1993). Il Pensiero Politico di Joseph de Maistre. Roma-Bari: Laterza ISBN 88-420-4157-2.
- Fisichella, Domenico (2005). Joseph de Maistre, Pensatore Europeo. Roma-Bari: Laterza ISBN 88-420-7598-1.
- Garrard, Graeme (1995). Maistre, Judge of Jean-Jacques. An Examination of the Relationship between Jean-Jacques Rousseau, Joseph de Maistre, and the French Enlightenment. Oxford: Oxford University Doctoral Thesis.
- Garrard, Graeme (1996). "Joseph de Maistre's Civilization and Its Discontents," Journal of the History of Ideas, Vol. 57, No. 3, pp. 429–46.
- Ghervas, Stella (2008). Réinventer la Tradition: Alexandre Stourdza et l'Europe de la Sainte-Alliance. Paris: Honoré Champion. ISBN 978-2-7453-1669-1.
- Gianturco, Elio (1937). Joseph de Maistre and Giambattista Vico (Italian Roots of the Maistre's Political Culture). New York: Columbia University.
- Gianturco, Elio (1936). "Juridical Culture and Politico-historical Judgement in Joseph de Maistre", Roman Revue, Vol. 27, pp. 254–262.
- Glaudes, Pierre (1997). Joseph de Maistre et Les figures de l'Histoire: Trois Essais sur un Précurseur du Romantisme Français. In: Cahiers Romantiques. Saint Genouph: Librairie Nizet.
- Godechot, Jacques (1982). The Counter-Revolution, Princeton University Press.
- Lebrun, Richard A. (1988). Joseph de Maistre: An Intellectual Militant. Montreal: McGill-Queen's University Press. ISBN 0-7735-0645-4.
- Lebrun, Richard A. (ed., 1988). Maistre Studies, Lanham, MD: University Press of America.
- Lebrun, Richard A. (2001). Joseph de Maistre's Life, Thought and Influence: Selected Studies. Ottawa: McGill-Queen's University Press.
- Lombard, Charles (1976). Joseph de Maistre. Boston: Twayne. ISBN 0-8057-6247-7.
- Lebrun, Richard (1967). "Joseph de Maistre, how Catholic a Reaction?" (PDF). CCHA Study Sessions. 34: 29–45. Archived from the original (PDF) on 7 January 2007.
- Legittimo, Gianfranco (1963). Sociologi Cattolici Italiani: De Maistre, Taparelli, Toniolo. Roma: Il Quadrato.
- Maistre, Rodolphe de, Hexis d'un soir ou de la prénotion d'un retour de l'Esprit dans la science, La Compagnie Littéraire, 2016, 154p. [1] (ISBN 978-2-87683-566-5)
- Mandoul, Jean (1900). Un Homme d'État Italien: Joseph de Maistre et la Politique de la Maison de Savoie. Paris: Alcan.
- Mazlish, Bruce (1955). Burke, Bonald and de Maistre. A Study in Conservatism. New York: Columbia University Doctoral Thesis.
- McMahon, Darrin M. (2002). Enemies of the Enlightenment: The French Counter-Enlightenment and the Making of Modernity. Oxford University Press.
- Menczer, Béla (1962). "Joseph de Maistre." In: Catholic Political Thought, 1789–1848. University of Notre Dame Press, pp. 59–61.
- Monteton, Charles Philippe Dijon de (2007). Die Entzauberung des Gesellschaftsvertrags. Ein Vergleich der Anti-Sozial-Kontrakts-Theorien von Carl Ludwig von Haller und Joseph Graf de Maistre im Kontext der politischen Ideengeschichte. Frankfurt am Main et al. ISBN 978-3-631-55538-5.
- Morley, John (1909). "Joseph de Maistre." In: Critical Miscellanies. London: Macmillan & Co., pp. 257–338.
- Muret, Charlotte Touzalin (1933). French Royalist Doctrines since the Revolution. New York: Columbia University Press.
- Pickering, Mary (1993). Auguste Comte: An Intellectual Biography. Vol. 1. Cambridge: Cambridge University Press. ISBN 052143405X.
- Pranchère, Jean-Yves (1992). Qu'est-ce que la Royauté? Joseph de Maistre. Paris: Vrin.
- Pranchère, Jean-Yves (2005). L'Autorité contre les Lumières: la Philosophie de Joseph de Maistre. Geneva: Droz.
- Sacré-Cœur Mercier, Lucille du (1953). The Historical Thought of the Comte Joseph de Maistre. Washington: Catholic University of America Thesis.
- Siedentop, Larry Alan (1966). The Limits of Enlightenment. A Study of Conservative Political Thought in Early Nineteenth-Century France with Special Reference to Maine de Biran and Joseph de Maistre. Oxford: Oxford University Doctoral Thesis.
- Thorup, Mikkel (2005). "'A World Without Substance': Carl Schmitt and the Counter-Enlightenment," Distinktion: Scandinavian Journal of Social Theory, Vol. 6, No. 1, pp. 19–39.
- Thurston, Benjamin (2001). Joseph de Maistre. Logos and Logomachy. Oxford: Brasenose College-Oxford University Doctoral Thesis.
- Vermale, François (1921), Notes sur Joseph de Maistre Inconnu. Chambéry: Perrin, M. Dardel Successeur.
