= Richard Lebrun =

Canadian historian of ideas

Richard Lebrun is a Canadian historian and Emeritus Professor of History at the University of Manitoba. He is the leading scholar of Joseph de Maistre in English.

Lebrun was educated at St. John's University where he gained his BA in 1953 and at the University of Minnesota where he gained his MA in 1957 and his PhD in 1963.

Lebrun has edited and annotated the published and unpublished works of de Maistre.

== Works ==
- Throne and Altar: The Political and Religious Thought of Joseph de Maistre (Ottawa: University of Ottawa Press, 1965).
- Joseph de Maistre: An Intellectual Militant (Kingston and Montreal: McGill-Queen's University Press, 1988).
- (editor), Joseph de Maistre's Life, Thought, and Influence: Selected Studies (Montreal and Kingston: McGill-Queen's University Press, 2001).
- Lamennais: A Believer's Revolutionary Politics (Leiden & Boston: Brill, 2018) Translations by Richard A Lebrun & Jerry Ryan, Introduction and Annotations by Sylvain Milbach
