= The Counter-Enlightenment =

Essay by Isaiah Berlin

"The Counter-Enlightenment" is an essay by Isaiah Berlin that examines eighteenth- and nineteenth-century critics of Enlightenment rationalism and universalism, arguing that their ideas helped shape modern pluralism, historicism, and cultural particularism.

The essay was a synthesis of lectures and longer essays on the critics of the Enlightenment, especially Giambattista Vico, Johann Gottfried Herder, Joseph de Maistre and Johann Georg Hamann; his essays on Vico, Hamann and Herder were later collected in Three Critics of the Enlightenment. Berlin referred to this movement as the Counter-Enlightenment, a movement that arose primarily in late 18th and early 19th century Germany against the Enlightenment's rationalism, universalism and empiricism.

In the essay, Vico is presented as an early critic of attempts to understand human society through timeless rational principles detached from history, Herder as a defender of cultural plurality and national individuality, Hamann as a critic of abstract reason who stressed the role of language and imagination, and de Maistre as an authoritarian and anti-rationalist opponent of revolutionary universalism.

Commentators have argued that Berlin’s engagement with Counter-Enlightenment thinkers informed his view of ethics, a value pluralism and critique of monism. The essay was first published in 1973 in the Dictionary of the History of Ideas, and was later reprinted in a collection of Berlin's works, Against the Current, in 1981.

== Bibliography ==
- Berlin, Isaiah (1973). "The Counter-Enlightenment".
- Cherniss, Joshua; Hardy, Henry (25 May 2010). "Isaiah Berlin". Stanford Encyclopedia of Philosophy.
- Mali, Joseph; Wokler, Robert (2003). "Isaiah Berlin's Counter-Enlightenment". Transactions of the American Philosophical Society. 93 (5). University of Pennsylvania Press. JSTOR 20020351.
