= Against the Current: Essays in the History of Ideas =

Book by Isaiah Berlin

- 2001 Princeton University Press edition
- Author: Isaiah Berlin
- Subject: History of Ideas
- Publisher: Pimlico
- Publication date: 1979
- Media type: Print (Paperback)
- Pages: 300
- ISBN: 0-7126-6690-7

Against the Current: Essays in the History of Ideas (1979) is a collection of essays by the 20th-century philosopher and historian Isaiah Berlin.

== Summary ==
The collection was edited by Henry Hardy and featured an introduction by Roger Hausheer. The book collects previously published essays in which Berlin discusses the thoughts of 20th century ideologic dissenters who were opposed to the prevailing wisdom of their time. A wide range of individuals are discussed including Machiavelli, Giambattista Vico, Montesquieu, Alexander Herzen, Georges Sorel, Verdi, and Moses Hess

The collection represents Berlin's long-held interest in figures who held dissenting or minority views; but who, despite this, are now important influences on modern thought. By emphasizing these individuals, Berlin attempts to address the issue of imbalances in the history of ideas. As Hausheer explains in the introduction: "At every step forward in our collective development, Berlin seems to say, we must pause to listen to the voices crying out in tortured dissent, or just raised to utter criticism, whether cautiously reasoned or wildly inchoate: we ignore them at our peril, for they may tell us something vital about ourselves".

Included is "The Counter-Enlightenment" an essay first published in 1973. In this essay, Berlin explains his theory of a Counter-Enlightenment. Berlin traces the ideology of figures such as Giambattista Vico, from their opposition to enlightenment ideals to the emergence of Romanticism and Existentialism.

== Publication history ==
- Berlin, Isaiah (2000). Against the Current: Essays in the History of Ideas. Princeton: Princeton University Press. ISBN 9780691090269.
- Berlin, Isaiah (1979). Against the Current: Essays in the History of Ideas. London: Pimlico. ISBN 0-7126-6492-0.
