= Laurence Marks =

Laurence Marks may refer to:

- Laurence Marks (British writer) (born 1948), British TV writer
- Laurence Marks (American writer) (1915–1993), American writer for radio and television shows including M*A*S*H
- Laurence Marks (journalist) (1928–1996), British journalist for The Observer and The Sunday Times
- Laurence D. Marks (born 1954), American professor of materials science and engineering

== See also ==
- Laurence Mark (born 1949), American film producer
