= Graeme Garrard =

Canadian political theorist and writer (born 1965)

Graeme Garrard (born 1965) is a Canadian political theorist and writer. He is Emeritus Professor of Politics at Cardiff University in the UK.

== Life and career ==
Garrard was born to British parents in Toronto, Canada and educated at Trinity College, Toronto, before attending Balliol College, Oxford for his DPhil degree in Political Thought. His doctoral dissertation, supervised by Sir Larry Siedentop and Sir Isaiah Berlin, was on the place of Jean-Jacques Rousseau and Joseph de Maistre in the Counter-Enlightenment.

He has taught the history of political thought and political philosophy at Cardiff University in the UK since 1994. He has been a visiting associate professor at Dartmouth College and Williams College in the US, and was an instructor in government at the Harvard Summer School in Cambridge, Massachusetts from 2006 to 2018. He taught for a term at The American University of Paris in 2004, and in 2013 was a visiting fellow of Clare Hall, Cambridge.

Garrard is a Fellow of the Royal Historical Society, a Fellow of The Learned Society of Wales. and a Fellow of The Academy of Social Sciences.

As an undergraduate he served in the Royal Canadian Navy reserve from 1985 to 1990 under the University Naval Training Division (UNTD) programme. He was a member of the ship's company of the ‘stone frigate’ HMCS York in Toronto throughout this period. He left the Naval Reserve with the final rank of Lieutenant (Navy).

== Books ==
- Rousseau's Counter-Enlightenment: A Republican Critique of the Philosophes (SUNY Press, 2003). ISBN 0-7914-5604-8
- Counter-Enlightenments: From the Eighteenth Century to the Present (Routledge Publishing, 2006). ISBN 9780415852968
- How to Think Politically: Sages, Scholars and Statesmen Whose Ideas Have Shaped the World, co-authored with James Murphy (Bloomsbury Publishing, 2019). ISBN 9781472961778
- The Return of the State: And Why it is Essential for our Health, Wealth and Happiness (Yale University Press, 2022). ISBN 9780300256758
