= Three Critics of the Enlightenment =

Book by Isaiah Berlin

Three Critics of the Enlightenment: Vico, Hamann, Herder
- The 2000 hardback first edition
- Author: Isaiah Berlin
- Subject: Counter-Enlightenment
- Genre: History of philosophy
- Publisher: Pimlico
- Publication date: 2000
- Media type: Hardcover, paperback
- ISBN: 0-7126-6492-0
- OCLC: 611211986

Three Critics of the Enlightenment: Vico, Hamann, Herder is a collection of essays in the history of philosophy by 20th century philosopher and historian of ideas Isaiah Berlin. Edited by Henry Hardy and released posthumously in 2000, the collection comprises the previously published works Vico and Herder: Two Studies in the History of Ideas (1976) – an essay on Counter-Enlightenment thinkers Giambattista Vico and Johann Gottfried Herder – and The Magus of the North: J. G. Hamann and the Origins of Modern Irrationalism (1993), concerning irrationalist Johann Georg Hamann.

== Overview ==
Berlin's initial interest in the critics of the Enlightenment arose through reading the works of Marxist historian of ideas Georgi Plekhanov.

Vico and Herder are portrayed by Berlin as alternatives to the rationalistic epistemology which characterized the Enlightenment. Berlin held that the agenda of the Enlightenment could be understood in a number of ways, and that to view it from the perspectives of its critics (i.e. Vico, Herder and Hamann) was to bring its distinctive and controversial aspects into sharp focus. Three Critics was one of Berlin's many publications on the Enlightenment and its enemies that did much to popularise the concept of a Counter-Enlightenment movement that he characterised as relativist, anti-rationalist, vitalist and organic, and which he associated most closely with German Romanticism.

Berlin identifies Hamann as one of the first thinkers to conceive of human cognition as language – the articulation and use of symbols. Berlin saw Hamann as having recognised as the rationalist's Cartesian fallacy the notion that there are "clear and distinct" ideas "which can be contemplated by a kind of inner eye", without the use of language. Herder, coiner of the term Nazionalismus (nationalism) is portrayed by Berlin as conceiving of the nation as a "people's culture," the unique way of life of a particular folk, bound by ties of kinship and ties to land, defined by their unique history.

== Controversies ==
The historian Zeev Sternhell has raised questions concerning the editing of the work, pointing to Henry Hardy's replacement of Berlin's citations of secondary sources with primary sources on a number of occasions. He suggests that Hardy's editing "raises doubts as to Berlin's reading of his sources," and concludes with the following observation: "The question whether systematically omitting the secondary sources and replacing them with texts that Berlin himself did not mention, which probably means he did not read them, can be considered a legitimate procedure is highly dubious."

== Publication history ==
- Berlin, Isaiah (2000). Three Critics of the Enlightenment. Princeton: Princeton University Press. ISBN 0-691-05726-5.
- Berlin, Isaiah (2000). Three Critics of the Enlightenment. London: Pimlico. ISBN 0-7126-6492-0.
