= Andrew Malcolm (author) =

British author & campaigner (born 1948)

- Born: 10 October 1948 (age 78); England, U.K.
- Education: Cambridge University
- Occupations: Author, campaigner
- Writing career
- Language: English

Andrew Malcolm (born 10 October 1948) is a British author and campaigner.

He pursued a seven-year-long breach-of-contract claim against Oxford University Press, which he won with a landmark legal judgment in the Court of Appeal in 1990. Reporting on the verdict in The Observer, Laurence Marks wrote, "It is the first time in living memory that Grub Street has won such a victory over its oppressors". The case ended in July 1992 with a Tomlin order, a damages settlement under the terms of which the servants and agents of Oxford University are permanently barred from denigrating Malcolm or his work Making Names. Making Names is the first book in literary history to be afforded such legal protection.

Malcolm campaigned against the charitable status and tax exemption of the Oxford University Press, and was described by Private Eye as "the scourge of OUP".

== Making Names ==
Malcolm self-published Making Names in 1992 under the imprint Akme. According to WorldCat, the book is held in 21 libraries. In 1999 he published his second book, The Remedy, an account of his battle with the Oxford University Press.

Malcolm's first book, Making Names, is a philosophical dialogue

"in which two strangers meet one summer's morning in a near-miss car accident: Andrew Cause is a philosopher, Malcolm Effect a research scientist. In their ensuing day-long conversation, Cause subjects Effect to a sustained skeptical attack upon the inadequacies and inconsistencies of his world-view. Traditional problems are introduced, including those of mind and body, cause and effect, free will, universals and the nature of moral goodness. Cause identifies the scientist's particle theory of matter as a crucially mistaken and hopeless metaphysics which has now outlived any usefulness. Step by step, Effect is reduced to a state of confusion, and finally he demands that Cause produce an alternative. In a literally dramatic climax the philosopher invokes a new model which, he claims, gets to the heart of things..."

In May 1985, after nine months of negotiation, Making Names was accepted for publication, subject to certain revisions, by the Oxford University Press general books editor, Henry Hardy. In correspondence, Malcolm stated that he would only do further work if he received Oxford's firm commitment to the book's publication. Hardy gave him this commitment in a telephone call, which Malcolm recorded. In a subsequent letter, Hardy wrote, "I'm pleased that we are going to do your book, and hope that it's a terrific success." OUP had the book refereed by two Oxford philosophers, Alan Ryan of New College and Galen Strawson of St Hugh's. Ryan wrote, "It's philosophically rather good, I think - it makes one of the shrewdest cases for a sort of Collingwoodian Idealism that I've read... Making Names is well worth doing, both because it is interesting in itself, and because it's a bold attempt to do philosophy in an unusual literary format." Strawson reported, "Making Names is really quite an attractive book. It is in no way crazy. It is very easy to read. Malcolm has a real gift for informal exposition... He is very clear and he knows what he's talking about... I think Making Names might prove extremely effective as an introduction to philosophical problems and procedures."

In Hardy's own account, Malcolm's book then "fell victim to an internal disagreement at Oxford University Press" when its managing director, Richard Charkin, overruled Hardy's favourable view, served him with a disciplinary warning, and transferred him to another department of OUP. When Malcolm returned six months later with the book revised as agreed, he found that it was instead to be handled by a junior editor, Nicola Bion, who turned it down.

== Reviews ==
In an affidavit for the damages assessment, Professor Roy Edgley of Sussex University said, "Making Names is an exceptional piece of work, highly unusual in both its content and presentation. Malcolm's use of dialogue is in certain ways more fully dramatic than Plato's or Berkeley's, his writing is fluent and wonderfully easy to read. Most of the major philosophical problems are presented and argued, but it is not until the final chapter that Malcolm's fusion of philosophy and drama takes its most audacious step, when he presents his very striking version of the tragedy Electra. Malcolm has done something in this book which is unique."

Upon its publication in 1992, Making Names was reviewed by R. W. Noble in the TES: "Andrew Malcolm's Making Names, with its entertaining philosophical dialogues, is an interesting publishing event in itself, even if we were not aware of the fact that this book made legal history when the Appeal Court ruled that Oxford University Press infringed the law when they reneged on their contract to publish it....Malcolm, as his title forewarns us, deals with some modish issues of semiotics, but the overall contents are more comparable to some of Bertrand Russell's later writing, effectively communicating the essentials of philosophy and scientific theorising to students and general readers....The core dialogues in Making Names should prove to be a popular introductory text in public and college libraries, especially for students of philosophy, general studies, applied linguistics and English language teaching methods....Making Names is an original tour de force..."

Terence Kealey reviewed the book in The Spectator: "It is a comprehensive, professional textbook that introduces the philosophy that is taught in sixth-form colleges or polytechnics... Making Names is fun, it deserves to be published, and resourceful teachers will find it useful".

The October 1993 paperback edition carried commentary from Karl Popper, made in an April 1993 telephone call which Popper invited Malcolm to record and use: "I was deeply impressed by your Electra... I must say I read it... as if it were written by Sophocles. I really felt that you have caught the spirit of Greek tragedy, and I felt that you are a poet. I was deeply moved."

In 2002, The Oxford Student published a review reassessing the book: "Now, more than twenty years since its completion, Making Names is neither obsolete nor dispensable. The tragicomic legal struggle does little to lessen the intellectual merits of Making Names - its prose still shines, its questions still stand, and its 'Electra' remains one of the most powerful statements of the human condition written in the last century... An attentive reader would indeed find that Making Names is easily a good novel, and it is obvious to all that it is nothing short of a film script."

== Malcolm vs. Oxford University, 1986-1992 ==
Following OUP's refusal to publish his book, Malcolm issued a writ for breach of contract against the university on 23 December 1986. The case depended on whether the conversations and letters between Hardy and Malcolm constituted a contract. At the trial in March 1990, although Deputy Judge Gavin Lightman found that Hardy had made a firm commitment to Malcolm, he concluded that no legally binding contract had been entered into because specific details, such as the book's print run, format, and price, had not formally been agreed

Lightman's decision was overturned on appeal by a majority of two to one (Mustill LJ dissenting, but adding "for once it is satisfying to be in a minority"). Lord Justice Leggatt concluded: "It is difficult to know what the Deputy Judge [Lightman] meant by a 'firm commitment' other than an intention to create legal relations. Nothing short of that would have had any value whatever for Mr. Malcolm... To suggest that Mr. Hardy intended to induce Mr. Malcolm to revise the book by giving him a valueless assurance would be tantamount to an imputation of fraud... It follows that in my judgment when Mr. Hardy used the expressions 'commitment' and 'a fair royalty' he did in fact mean what he said; and I venture to think that it would take a lawyer to arrive at any other conclusion." Malcolm was awarded damages and costs.

== Authors' royalties and 'sheet dealing' ==
While the contract case clarified and in certain respects extended authors' rights, the ensuing assessment of damages proceedings (1991–1992) shed light on modern royalty agreements. In particular, the assessment dealt with 'sheet dealing'. Rather than, as formerly, paying royalties based on a book's cover price, publishers nowadays often prefer to pay royalties based on the publisher's net receipts, a practice which facilitates, amongst other things, multinational 'sheet dealing'. One of Malcolm's witnesses, author and former publishing executive Frederick Nolan, explained how this could benefit publishers at the expense of authors:

"It makes sense for the publisher to pay the author on the basis of what he receives, but it by no means makes it a good deal for the author. Example: 10,000 copies of a $20 book with a 10 percent cover-price royalty will earn him $20,000. The same number sold but discounted at 55 percent will net the publisher $90,000; the author's ten percent of that figure yields him $9,000. Which is one reason why publishers prefer "net receipts" contracts....Among the many other advantages (to the publisher) of such contracts is the fact that they make possible what is called a 'sheet deal'. In this, the (multinational) publisher of that same 10,000 copy print run, can substantially reduce his printing cost by 'running on' a further 10,000 copies (that is to say, printing but not binding them), and then further profit by selling these 'sheets' at cost-price or even lower if he so chooses to subsidiaries or overseas branches, then paying the author 10 percent of 'net receipts' from that deal. The overseas subsidiaries bind up the sheets into book form and sell at full price for a nice profit to the Group as a whole. The only one who loses is the author."

== Print on Demand ==
In 1999, Malcolm was invited to write two articles for the Times Literary Supplement, the first about the constitution of Oxford University Press and the second about the legal implications of the print-on-demand technology Oxford University Press was then introducing. In the latter article, Malcolm argued: "There are several powerful reasons why authors with existing contracts might wish to enforce the reversion of their copyrights in their out-of-print (printed on demand) works, and there is waiting to be set an important legal precedent which would at once allow them all to do so."

== The Remedy ==
In 1999 Malcolm published his second book, The Remedy, an account of the Oxford lawsuit. The Remedy was reviewed in the Times Higher Education Supplement by Henry Hardy, the editor who originally commissioned Making Names. Hardy wrote, "Andrew Malcolm has written two excellent books – an engaging and original introduction to philosophy in dialogue form, and this gripping story of the alleged ineptitude and skulduggery with which he was treated by a publisher to whom he offered it... Malcolm has a real gift for farce – and the portrayal of muddle and evasiveness on the part of the publishing grandees and their legal representatives is intensely tragicomic."

== The OUP Tax Exemption Debate ==
The Remedy was published in 1999, a controversial time for the OUP, following its 1998 closure of its modern poetry list. In February, Arts Minister Alan Howarth made a speech in Oxford in which he denounced the closure: "OUP is not merely a business. It is a department of the University of Oxford and has charitable status. It is part of a great university, which the Government supports financially and which exists to develop and transmit our intellectual culture...It is a perennial complaint by the English faculty that the barbarians are at the gate. Indeed they always are. But we don't expect the gatekeepers themselves, the custodians, to be barbarians."

With OUP's charitable status already in the news, The Remedy's appendix on the Oxbridge presses' tax exemption was seized on by the media, provoking much public discussion in the UK, USA, South Africa and India. In November, the Oxford Times made The Remedy's publication and the controversy over OUP's tax its front-page lead story. In 2001, Oxford finally lost a 25-year battle to retain its tax exemption in India. Asked by the Oxford Times if his campaigning had influenced the decision, Malcolm said, "I did get involved slightly last autumn by talking to the Indian Solicitor General. Whether that had any effect on the outcome I don't know, but it was a fine decision."

In 2007, from the National Archives at Kew, Malcolm obtained scans of CUP's and OUP's unsuccessful applications for tax-exemption made in the 1940s and 1950s and their later successful applications in the 1970s. He then indexed and posted these on the Akmedea website. Late in 2020, the papers held at Kew were withdrawn from public access and ruled closed for 50 years until 1 January 2029. This rendered the scans on the website their only public source.

== Malcolm vs. Oxford University, 2001–2002 ==
In his Times Higher Education Supplement review, Hardy wrote that in his original decision to publish Making Names, "he had the strong support – later withdrawn for reasons he never fully understood – of one of the Delegates." The Delegate referred to was Alan Ryan, who in 1985 in two reports had recommended Making Names' publication. On 13 April 2001, reacting to Hardy's review, Ryan wrote in the THES that he had changed his mind about publishing the book because "what had seemed fresh, lively and amusing seemed coarse and jeering the third time around." Malcolm claimed that this constituted a breach of the non-denigration clause of the 1992 settlement. Further litigation followed, and in March 2002 the case came before Mr. Justice Lightman, the judge whose ruling in Malcolm's publishing contract case twelve years earlier had been overturned. Lightman found that Ryan, though Warden of New College, was not an employee or servant of the university but an "independent contractor". After the judgement, Oxford claimed £41,622.50 costs. Malcolm was ordered to pay £12,500, and was then refused leave to appeal. His response was to write a letter to Oxford's solicitors in which he said, "I might, with the aid of certain benefactors, be able within a month or two to raise the entire sum of £12,500, and possibly even more, providing that the money is used by the University to endow a lecture series (or alternatively a part-time lectureship) in the subject of Publishing Law." Malcolm's offer was not taken up.

== Akme Expression ==
Malcolm's response to the 2002 judgment was to open a shop and gallery, Akme Expression, at 12 Broad Street in Oxford, opposite Balliol College and the Martyr's Mark. It was described in The Oxford Times as "the strangest bookshop and exhibition ever seen in Oxford."

The shop sold Malcolm's two books, with all proceeds going to Oxford University's £12,500 costs bill. In Publishing News, Andrew Blow asked, "Is there another bookshop in the world where the author can claim to have written all the stock?... Like other unusual bookshops, and like all great retail brands, Akme Expression is a monument to a monumental obsession." The shop's walls and window displays were filled with newspaper accounts of every story to have embarrassed Oxford in recent times. The gallery included "Another Oxford Story", based on the Oxford Story tourist attraction. Malcolm's exhibition was described in the Oxford Times: "At the bottom of the stairs is an Oxford don, in full academic dress, clutching a blood-stained knife in his hand. At the dummy don's feet lie two broken bottles of port, a crumpled blood-splattered Oxford University T-shirt and a sub-machine gun, while from her cell in the far end a model of the Patron Saint of Oxford, St. Frideswide, serenely surveys the grisly scene." There was also an AKME University installation, offering qualifications for sale. According to the Oxford Times, "the Presidency of Trickery College is priced at £12,500, the Mastership of Broke College is going for £500, while a first-class degree (any subject) is a snip at £200".

== Borders incident ==
Malcolm was invited by Borders in Oxford to hold a talk and book-signing session there on 4 October 2002. At the last minute, the event was cancelled by store management. According to a report in the Daily Telegraph, the event then "turned into farce when the management called the police, who arrived in three squad cars. Eight officers escorted the author and his audience from the shop, which said they were trespassing." Malcolm told the Oxford Mail, "this must have been the oddest invited book-signing in history: no window display, no poster, just an author quietly addressing his peaceable audience, while a team of security men solemnly requisitioned their table and chairs. It was not so much Nazi Germany as Monty Python. Now we know what free speech means in Oxford. In a way it's flattering. I never realised that what I have to say is so dangerous."

Following complaints from the public, Borders' international president Vin Altruda and UK managing director Philip Downer apologised: "We sincerely regret and apologise for the cancellation of Andrew Malcolm's event in Oxford, which should have gone ahead." Under heavy security, Malcolm's talk "Where is the university?" was rescheduled and held at a Borders store in Charing Cross Road, London, on 30 January 2003. Private Eye reported, "Andrew Malcolm, the scourge of OUP (Eyes passim), returned in triumph last week to the chain's Charing Cross Road store in London to pick up where he had left off."

== Akme Literary, Charity and Student Law libraries ==
In 1997 Malcolm launched an online law library posting various legal resources concerning publishing law. In 2006, www.akme was cited by the UK Charity Commission's consultation as having been influential in the new 'public benefit' requirement of the 2006 Charities Act with respect to the status of the university presses. The Act provoked fresh debate about the likely reform of the presses' tax liability. In 2009, The Guardian invited Malcolm to write an article on the subject.

In January 2006, Oxford became the first UK university to require enrolling students to sign contracts setting out a series of obligations. In response, Malcolm launched the Akme Student Law Library, providing a free archive of cases and other materials relating to university-student and college-student contract law.

It is claimed on the website that in October 2013, all the site's search links were erased from Google and the other internet search engines.

== Campaign for Oxford chancellor ==
In March 2003, following the death of Roy Jenkins, Malcolm ran for the post of Chancellor of Oxford University. According to a report in The Guardian, he put himself forward as a "hands-on reformer", promising to save Oxford's "battered reputation for integrity and academic excellence and help it regain its lost place amongst the front rank of the world's universities." Malcolm said he would "eradicate corruption, cash-for-places, croneyism, fustian bureaucracy and the many other such problems that have bedevilled and lately publicly disgraced the university." Malcolm was later forced to withdraw from the contest because the university registry claimed that eight of his nominators had not received an Oxford degree.

== Cambridge University Press and Assessment ==
In 2021, Malcolm was cited in a discussion on the formation of Cambridge University Press & Assessment reported in the Cambridge University Reporter. Dr D.D.K.Chow of Trinity College, expressed concerns about the lack of academic leadership of the new body:

"For 323 years, the Press has been tightly controlled under the University's academic leadership through the Press Syndicate (formerly Curators)...However, the Council's report proposes a Press and Assessment Syndicate, without such academic leadership....The proposed change in composition of the Syndicate...is in stark contrast to the arguments used by the Press to obtain its current tax exemption. In a landmark letter to the Inland Revenue in 1975, Sir Geoffrey Cass, then Chief Executive of the Press, wrote: "The Press of Cambridge University is actually no more than a department of the University, with no independent status of its own, governed by academic senior members of the University" and that it was not "an almost semi-independent 'international publisher'". (I must give due acknowledgement to Mr Andrew Malcolm for his efforts in obtaining this letter, disclosed by the university under the Freedom of Information Act)....Without adequate academic leadership, it would be all too easy for commercial concerns to override academic values, removing public benefit....If the Regent House does zippo to provide leadership on the Press and Assessment Syndicate, treating Cambridge University Press and Cambridge Assessment as cash cows, there is little reason for the university to continue owning them."

== The Remedy 3.0 and The Remedy 3.1 ==
In 2025, more than 20 years after the second edition of The Remedy, Malcolm, via Amazon KDP, published an expanded third edition, The Remedy 3.0. Its 37 new chapters brought the story up to date, widening its scope to include more recent OUP and Oxford University controversies.

The book included a table, based on OUP’s archive of annual accounts, showing that in the eleven years from 2008 to 2019 the press had amassed untaxed profits of over £1 billion. After the book’s publication, OUP withdrew its archive and from 2020 to 2023 it stopped publishing its accounts. In November 2025, this prompted Malcolm to launch his own archive of OUP’s accounts.

In February 2026, Malcolm published a fourth edition, The Remedy 3.1: How Oxford turned Scofflaw. This included two new chapters. 'Casualties' looked at Oxford's use of casual 'Deliveroo-style' service-provider contracts for academics. A second new chapter 'Accountability' told the story of OUP's withdrawal of its internet archive of annual accounts, in breach of the 2011 Charities Act. Malcolm concluded, "We have witnessed Oxford's contempt for publishing law and employment law. Now we have its breach of UK charity law. It has turned scofflaw."

== Works ==
- Andrew Malcolm, Making Names, AKME publications, 1992 (Hardback), 1993 (Paperback) ISBN 1-874222-00-2 and ISBN 1-874222-01-0
- Andrew Malcolm, The Remedy, AKME publications, published 1999, second edition 2002. ISBN 1-874222-90-8
- Andrew Malcolm, The Remedy 3.0, AKME publications, published 2025. ISBN 9798308015550
- Andrew Malcolm, The Remedy 3.1: How Oxford Turned Scofflaw, AKME publications, published 2026. ISBN 9798245249452
