= Sheet dealing =

In publishing, sheet dealing is the practice of extending a print run by "running on" extra copies of a book's sheets, which are then sold on to a subsidiary overseas publisher to be bound into books. Sheet dealing, which can allow publishers to reduce the amount of royalties they pay authors, has been widespread among multinationals since the 1980s. It is a way to move the sold product "off the books" and beyond the scope of the royalty agreement.

== Net receipts royalties ==
Methods of calculating royalties changed during the 1980s, due to the rise of retail chain booksellers, which demanded increasing discounts from publishers. As a result, rather than paying royalties based on a percentage of a book's cover price, publishers preferred to pay royalties based on their net receipts. During the 1986–92 court case of Andrew Malcolm vs Oxford University, Frederick Nolan, author and former publishing executive, explained how the new system made sheet dealing possible:

"It makes sense for the publisher to pay the author on the basis of what he receives, but it by no means makes it a good deal for the author. Example: 10,000 copies of a $20 book with a 10 percent cover-price royalty will earn the author $20,000. The same number sold but discounted at 55 percent will net the publisher $90,000; the author's ten percent of that figure yields him $9000. This is one reason why publishers prefer "net receipts" contracts: among the many other advantages (to the publisher) of such contracts is the fact that they make possible what is called a 'sheet deal'. In this, the (multinational) publisher of that same 10,000 copy print run, can substantially reduce his printing cost by 'running on' a further 10,000 copies (that is to say, printing but not binding them), and then further profit by selling these 'sheets' at cost-price or even lower if he so chooses to subsidiaries or overseas branches, then paying the author 10 percent of 'net receipts' from that deal. The overseas subsidiaries bind up the sheets into book form and sell at full price for a nice profit to the Group as a whole. The only one who loses is the author."

In 1991, David Croom, managing director of Routledge, declared that discounts could be as high as "80% in the case of bulk overseas sales."

== Englade vs HarperCollins ==
In 2003 two American authors, Ken Englade and Patricia Simpson, sued HarperCollins (USA) for selling their work to its foreign affiliates in Canada, Australia, New Zealand and the UK at improperly high discounts (72.5% for hardback and trade paperbacks and 75% for mass market paperbacks). They asserted "that Harper Collins has improperly engaged in selling quantities of its books on a non-returnable basis to its foreign affiliates, at below-market prices. Thus, according to plaintiffs, since Harper Collins and its foreign affiliates all have the same parent company, and since all of the contracts between authors and Harper Collins require that calculations of royalties to such authors be based on amounts 'received' by Harper Collins, Harper Collins is essentially selling books to itself, at discounted rates, upon which it then calculates the author's royalty, and then Harper Collins shares in the extra profit when the book is resold to the consumer by the foreign affiliates, without paying the author any further royalty."

The suit was successful, and the court forced a class action readjustment for all authors contracted by HarperCollins between November 1993 and June 1999. The publisher settled the action by making lump sum payments to all those authors who had received royalties paid on sales to foreign affiliates at these very high discounts.

=== Legal opinion ===
In 2003, following the HarperCollins case, Nicola Solomon, a leading British literary lawyer, said that the fairness of sheet dealing was mixed, depending in part upon the language of the agreement and its effect on royalty distribution. Publishers and authors have conflicting interests, and unrepresented authors are particularly subject to adverse bookkeeping and self dealing by the publisher. (Note: "This is a very difficult issue. Most unagented authors (and some with agents) grant worldwide volume rights, sub-licence and subsidiary rights including translation rights to their publishers. Many publishers choose to sell or sub-license to their overseas associate companies. This can work in your favour; very often a publisher is able to give a larger advance because it knows that its associate will take the book overseas. In an ideal world its established relations with its associate company should allow the two companies to work smoothly together to ensure that sales are maximised. However, many authors are rightly suspicious that cosy deals go on within groups which result in lesser overall royalties to the author....Publishers must make reasonable endeavours to sell books, and must deal with third parties on a bona fide arm's length basis which is reasonable and fair to you. Publishers are not entitled to make a secret profit by selling through a subsidiary, particularly if you would have obtained more by direct sales. "If your work has been sold to an associate company it is worth asking your publisher some questions to ensure that you are obtaining a fair royalty. Even better, ask that you be paid royalties on all sales linked to British published price or on a percentage of the associated company's receipts. Some publishers already calculate US royalties according to the receipts of their American subsidiary, which is clearly much better for authors....If you are unhappy about what your publisher is doing, don't simply accept it; ask for an explanation about anything that seems odd, check in your contract to see if it is covered and then speak to the Society or a solicitor if you are still uneasy.")

To be sure, more sales may make for more money to distribute. Increased sales may mean increased revenue to someone, but may result in decreased or diminished royalties to the author. But the net effect of such distribution upon the author's royalty may depend upon the wording of the royalty agreement, the publisher's accounting methods and practices, and where the sales and transactions take place. Such arrangements are rife with conflict of laws when they cross international borders.

== See also ==
- Advance against royalties
- Author#Compensation
- Royalty payment
- Self-dealing
