= Oswald Bayer =

German Lutheran theologian

- Born: 30 September 1939 (age 86); Nagold, Germany
- Occupations: Theologian, Luther scholar

Oswald Bayer (German: [ˈbaɪɐ]; born 30 September 1939) is a German Lutheran theologian, and is Professor Emeritus of Systematic Theology at the Evangelical Theological Faculty of the Eberhard Karls University of Tübingen, Germany. The author of several books in German, he is also an ordained pastor of the Evangelical-Lutheran Church in Württemberg and president of the senate of the Luther Academy in Ratzeburg. Although Bayer is a major contemporary Lutheran theologian, so far little of his work has been translated from German into English.

== Life ==
Oswald Bayer studied Protestant theology and philosophy in Tübingen, Bonn and Rome, received his doctorate in 1968 and habilitation in 1970 on the concept of promissio (promise) in the theology of the young Luther. His doctoral and postdoctoral work has been titled Promissio. He has also written on the history of the turning point in Luther's Reformation theology.

Oswald Bayer taught from 1974 to 1979 as professor of Systematic Theology at the Ruhr University Bochum. In 1979 he was appointed director of the Institute for Christian Social Ethics at the University of Tübingen. In 1995 he moved to the chair of systematic theology. Since 2005, Oswald Bayer has been Professor Emeritus of Systematic Theology at the University of Tübingen.

== Work ==
Oswald Bayer's theology is based on Luther's theology of word and promise which he uses to provide a critical engagement with modernity. To this end Bayer builds on Hamann's critique of Kant and the enlightenment, but also includes the developments in linguistics of the 20th Century (for example, Paul Ricoeur, Ludwig Wittgenstein). He has published numerous interpretations of Luther and Hamann.

The center of theology is the promise of God to man to which man responds in faith. Faith is therefore always, to Oswald Bayer, a speech act, a spoken exchange between God and man. The exemplary center of this exchange is the Divine Service, the source and aim of all theology. Christian theology is therefore regarded as the interpretation of this speech act between the justifying God and the justified sinner. For Bayer this is - in reference to Martin Luther - the object of theology (the subiectum theologiae). A theology which interprets this word act, is itself always the hearer of the word of God. Oswald Bayer utilises this systematic approach in the areas of hermeneutics, theory of science, sociology and ethics, as well as in his sermons. The latter he makes available to a large audience as the Göttinger Predigten im Internet.

He uses his theology of the word pointedly against modern subjective theology in the tradition of Friedrich Daniel Ernst Schleiermacher, as it is represented at present in modified form for example by Bayer's Tübingen colleague Eilert Herms. In addition, Bayer also engages in depth with other contemporary theological and philosophical systems (such as Marxism).

== Bibliography ==
- Promissio. Geschichte der reformatorischen Wende in Luthers Theologie (2. Aufl. 1989)
- Schöpfung als Anrede. Zu einer Hermeneutik der Schöpfung (2. Aufl. 1990)
- Authorität und Kritik. Zu Hermeneutik und Wissenschaftstheorie (1991)
- Leibliches Wort. Reformation und Neuzeit im Konflikt (1992)
- Freiheit als Antwort. Zur theologischen Ethik (1995)
- Zeitgenosse im Widerspruch. Johann Georg Hamann als radikaler Aufklärer (1988)
- Theologie. Handbuch Systematischer Theologie 1 (1994)
- Gott als Author. Zu einer poietologischen Theologie (1999)
- Vernunft ist Sprache. Hamanns Metakritik Kants (2002)
- Martin Luthers Theologie. Eine Vergegenwärtigung (3. Aufl. 2007)
- Bayer, Oswald u. Gleede, Benjamin (Hrsgg.): Creator est creatura. Luthers Christologie als Lehre von der Idiomenkommunikation, Berlin 2007

== Writings in English ==
A few of Bayer's books have been made available to the English-speaking world.

- Living by Faith: Justification and Sanctification. Translated by Geoffrey W. Bromiley. Grand Rapids: Eerdmans, 2003.
- Martin Luther's Theology: A Contemporary Interpretation. Translated by Thomas H. Trapp. Grand Rapids: Eerdmans, 2003.
- Theology the Lutheran Way. Translated by Jeffrey G. Silcock and Mark C. Mattes. Grand Rapids: Eerdmans, 2007.
- Oswald Bayer, and Alan Suggate. Worship and Ethics: Lutherans and Anglicans in Dialogue. Theologische Bibliothek Toplemann, no. 70. Berlin: Walter de Gruyter, 1995.
- Tillich as Systematic Theologian, The Cambridge companion to Paul Tillich. Russell Re Manning (ed). Cambridge, UK: Cambridge University Press, 2009
- A Contemporary in Dissent: Johann Georg Hamann as a Radical Enlightener. Translated by Roy A. Harrisville and Mark C. Mattes. Grand Rapids: Eerdmans, 2012. (https://www.eerdmans.com/Products/6670/a-contemporary-in-dissent.aspx)

Bayer has also published numerous articles that have been translated into English. Many of these have appeared in journals such as Lutheran Quarterly, Modern Theology, and others.
