= Johann Georg Hamann =

German philosopher (1730–1788)

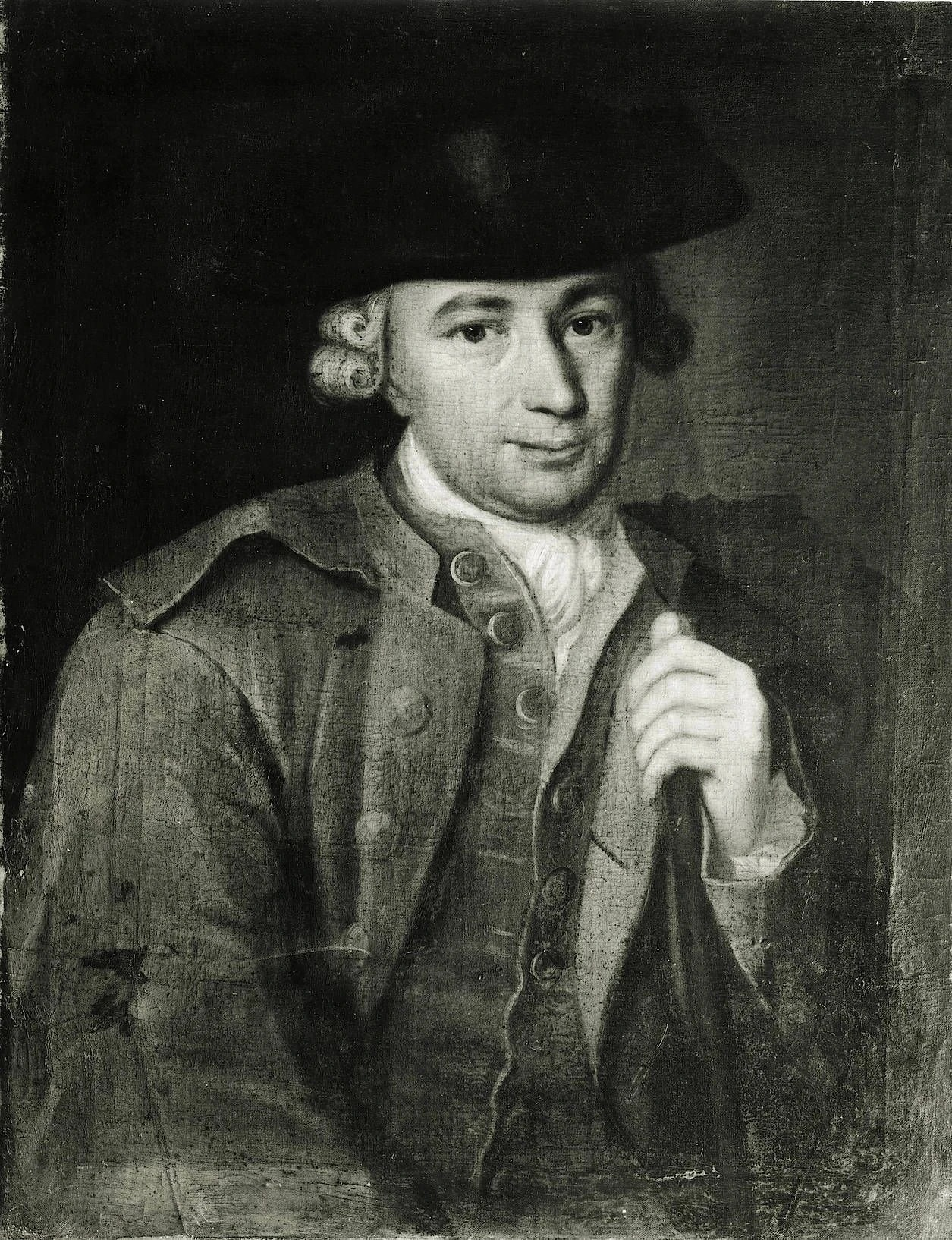
- Born: 27 August 1730; Königsberg, Kingdom of Prussia
- Died: 21 June 1788 (aged 57); Münster, Prince-Bishopric of Münster, Holy Roman Empire

Education
- Education: University of Königsberg (1746–1752; no degree)

Philosophical work
- Era: 18th-century philosophy
- Region: Western philosophy
- School: Post-Kantian; Counter-Enlightenment; Sturm und Drang
- Main interests: Aesthetics; Epistemology; Philosophy of language; Philosophy of mind; Philosophy of history; Political philosophy
- Notable ideas: "Reason is language" ("Vernunft ist Sprache")

Johann Georg Hamann (/ˈhɑːmɑːn/; German: [ˈhaːman]; 27 August 1730 – 21 June 1788) was a German Lutheran philosopher from Königsberg. Known by the pen name "the Magus (Wizard) of the North", he was one of the leading figures of post-Kantian philosophy. His work was used by his student Johann Gottfried Herder as the main support of the Sturm und Drang movement, and is associated with the Counter-Enlightenment and Romanticism.

He introduced Kant, also from Königsberg, to the works of both David Hume – which Kant credited with waking him from his "dogmatic slumber" – and Jean-Jacques Rousseau. Hamann was influenced by Hume, but he used his views to argue for rather than against Christianity.

Johann Wolfgang von Goethe and Søren Kierkegaard were among those who considered him to be the finest mind of his time. He was also a key influence on G. W. F. Hegel and Friedrich Jacobi. Long before the linguistic turn, Hamann believed epistemology should be replaced by the philosophy of language.

== Early life ==
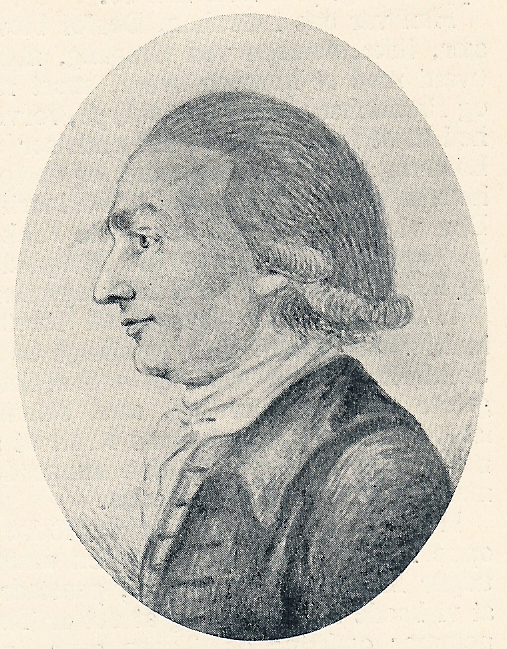
Johann Georg Hamann (20th century drawing)

Hamann was born on 27 August 1730 in Königsberg (now Kaliningrad, Russia). Initially he studied theology at the University of Königsberg, but became a clerk in a mercantile house and afterward held many small public offices, devoting his leisure to reading philosophy. His first publication was a study in political economy about a dispute on nobility and trade. He wrote under the pen name of "the Magus of the North" (German: Magus im Norden). Hamann was a believer in the Enlightenment until a mystical experience in London in 1758. There, he underwent a profound Christian conversion, reorienting his whole life and philosophy around the prophetic illuminating power of the Bible. This shift influenced all his subsequent work, shaping his views of nature, reason, and human identity.

His translation of David Hume into German is considered by most scholars to be the one that Hamann's friend Immanuel Kant, also from Königsberg, credited with awakening him from his "dogmatic slumber". Hamann and Kant held each other in mutual respect, although Hamann once declined an invitation by Kant to co-write a physics textbook for children. Hamann also introduced Kant to the work of Rousseau.

=== Music ===
Hamann was a lutenist, having studied this instrument with Timofiy Bilohradsky (a student of Sylvius Leopold Weiss), a Ukrainian virtuoso then living in Königsberg.

== Philosophical views ==
His distrust of autonomous, disembodied reason and the Enlightenment ("I look upon the finest logical demonstration the way a sensible girl regards a love letter" was one of his many witticisms) led him to conclude that faith in God was the only solution to the vexing problems of philosophy.

One of Kant's biographers compared him with Hamann:

Kant made reason the rule of his life and the source of his philosophy; Hamann found the source of both in his heart. While Kant dreaded enthusiasm in religion, and suspected in it superstition and fanaticism, Hamann reveled in enthusiasm; and he believed in revelation, miracles, and worship, differing also in these points from the philosopher. In some respects they complemented each other; but the repelling elements were too strong to make them fully sympathetic. The difference in their stand-points, however, makes Hamann’s views of Kant all the more interesting.

In Hamann's own terms Kant was a "Platonist" about reason, believing it disembodied, and Hamann an "Aristotelian" who believed it was embodied. Hamann was greatly influenced by Hume. This is most evident in Hamann's conviction that faith and belief, rather than knowledge, determine human actions. Also, Hamann asserted that the efficacy of a concept arises from the habits it reflects rather than any inherent quality it possesses.

=== Works ===
Hamann's writings consist of small essays. They display two striking tendencies. The first is their brevity, in comparison with works by his contemporaries. The second is their breadth of allusion and delight in extended analogies. His work was also significantly reactive; rather than advance a "position" of his own, his principal mode of thinking was to respond to others' work. For example, his work Golgotha and Scheblimini! By a Preacher in the Wilderness (1784) was directed against Moses Mendelssohn's Jerusalem, or on Religious Might and Judaism (1782).

Hamann famously used the image of Socrates, who often proclaimed to know nothing, in his Socratic Memorabilia, an essay in which Hamann critiques the Enlightenment's dependence on reason. In Aesthetica in nuce, Hamann counters the Enlightenment by emphasizing the importance of aesthetic experience and the role of genius in intuiting nature.

==== Editions ====
Fragments of his writings were published by Cramer, under the title of Sibyllinische Blätter des Magus aus Norden (1819), and a complete edition by Roth (7 vols., 1821–25, with a volume of additions and explanations by Wiener, 1843). Hamann's des Magus in Norden Leben und Schriften, edited by Gildemeister, was published in 5 vols., 1857–68, and a new edition of his Schriften und Briefen, edited by Petri, in 4 vols., 1872–74.

=== God ===
Hamann argued that the communicatio idiomatum, namely, the communication of divine messages through material embodiments, applies not just to Christ, but should be generalised to cover all human action: "This communicatio of divine and human idiomatum is a fundamental law and the master-key of all our knowledge and of the whole visible economy." Hamann believed all of creation were signs from God for us to interpret.

=== Reason is language ===
His most notable contributions to philosophy were his thoughts on language, which have often been considered as a forerunner to the linguistic turn in analytic philosophy such as Wittgenstein's. He famously said that "Reason is language" ("Vernunft ist Sprache"). Hamann thought the bridge between Kant's noumenal and phenomenal realms was language, with its noumenal meaning and phenomenal letters.

== Legacy and evaluation ==
Hamann was one of the precipitating forces for the Counter-Enlightenment. He was, moreover, a mentor to Herder and an admired influence on Goethe, Jacobi, Hegel, Kierkegaard, Lessing, and Mendelssohn. Roman Catholic theologian Hans Urs von Balthasar devoted a chapter to Hamann in his volume, Studies in Theological Styles: Lay Styles (Volume III in the English language translation of The Glory of the Lord series). Most recently, Hamann's influence can be found in the work of the theologians Oswald Bayer (Lutheran), John Milbank (Anglican), and David Bentley Hart (Eastern Orthodox). Finally, in Charles Taylor's important summative work, The Language Animal: The Full Shape of the Human Linguistic Capacity (Taylor, 2016), Hamann is given credit, along with Wilhelm von Humboldt and Herder, for inspiring Taylor's "HHH" (Hamann, Herder, and Humboldt) approach to the philosophy of language, emphasizing the creative power and cultural specificity of language.

Historian of ideas Isaiah Berlin writes that Hamann "struck the most violent blow against the Enlightenment" and was "the first person to declare war upon the Enlightenment in the most open, violent and complete fashion." While describing Hamann as one of "the few wholly original critics of modern times", Berlin also asserts that the German philosopher was "the pioneer of anti-rationalism in every sphere." However, according to John Betz, "modern Hamann scholarship has come to see that he was, in some sense, radically progressive – in fact, as Oswald Bayer has put it, a 'radical Enlightener.' " Bayer views him as less the proto-Romantic that Herder presented, and more a premodern-postmodern thinker who brought the consequences of Lutheran theology to bear upon the burgeoning Enlightenment and especially in reaction to Kant.

== See also ==
- Arche-writing – Concept in the philosophy of language

== Sources ==
- Isaiah Berlin; Henry Hardy (ed.) The Magus of the North: J. G. Hamann and the Origins of Modern Irrationalism, London, John Murray, 1993, ISBN 0-719-55312-1
- Isaiah Berlin; Henry Hardy (ed.) Three Critics of the Enlightenment: Vico, Hamann, Herder, London and Princeton, 2000, ISBN 0-691-05726-5
- Dickson, Gwen Griffith, Johann Georg Hamann's Relational Metacriticism (contains English translations of Socratic Memorabilia, Aesthetica in Nuce, a selection of essays on language, Essay of a Sibyl on Marriage and Metacritique of the Purism of Reason), Walter de Gruyter, 1995. ISBN 3-11-014437-9
- Forster, Michael N., After Herder: Philosophy of Language in the German Tradition, Oxford University Press, 2010, ch. 8–9.
- David Bentley Hart, "The Laughter of the Philosophers", First Things. January 2005.
- Kenneth Haynes (ed.), Hamann: Writings on Philosophy and Language (Cambridge Texts in the History of Philosophy), Cambridge University Press, 2007, ISBN 978-0-521-81741-7
- James C. O'Flaherty, Unity and Language: A Study in the Philosophy of Hamann, University of North Carolina, 1952;
- James C. O'Flaherty, Hamann's Socratic Memorabilia: A Translation and Commentary, Johns Hopkins Press, 1967; Library of Congress Catalog Card No. 67-12424;
- James C. O'Flaherty, Johann Georg Hamann, Twayne Publishers, 1979, ISBN 0-8057-6371-6;
- James C. O'Flaherty, The Quarrel of Reason with Itself: Essays on Hamann, Michaelis, Lessing, Nietzsche, Camden House, 1988, ISBN 0-938100-56-4
