= Counter-Enlightenment =

Intellectual stance against mainstream attitudes of the 18th-century Enlightenment

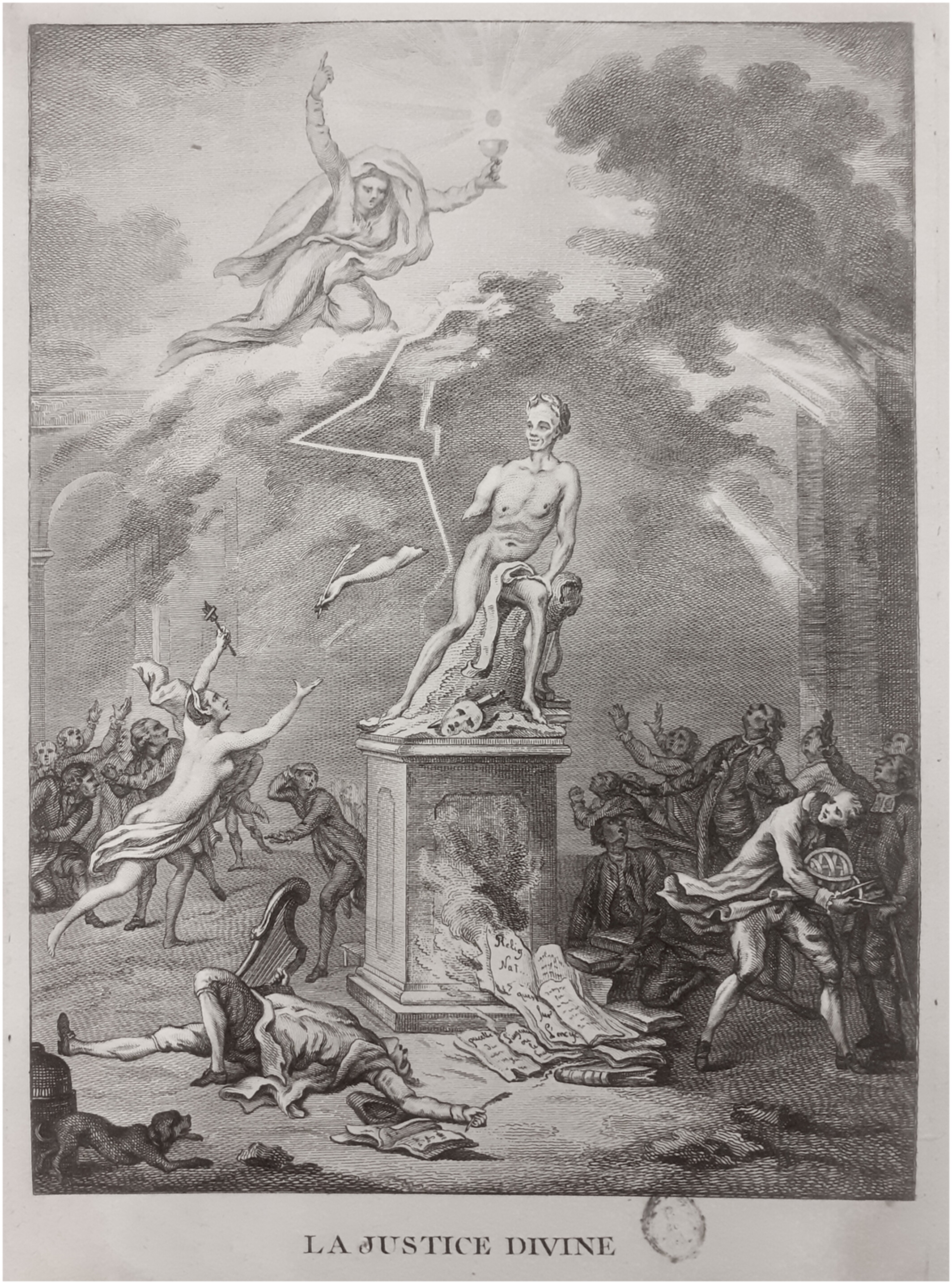
Divine Justice smites Jean-Baptiste Pigalle's statue of Voltaire. Anonymous, 1773

The Counter-Enlightenment refers to a loose collection of intellectual stances that arose during the European Enlightenment in opposition to its mainstream attitudes and ideals. The Counter-Enlightenment is generally seen to have continued from the 18th century into the early 19th century, especially with the rise of Romanticism. Its thinkers did not necessarily agree to a set of counter-doctrines but instead each challenged specific elements of Enlightenment thinking, such as the belief in progress, the rationality of all humans, liberal democracy, and the increasing secularisation of European society.

Scholars differ on who is to be included among the major figures of the Counter-Enlightenment. In Italy, Giambattista Vico criticised the spread of reductionism and the Cartesian method, which he saw as unimaginative and stifling creative thinking. Decades later, Joseph de Maistre in Sardinia-Piedmont and Edmund Burke in Britain both criticised the anti-religious ideas of the Enlightenment for leading to the Reign of Terror and a totalitarian police state following the French Revolution. The ideas of Jean-Jacques Rousseau and Johann Georg Hamann were also significant to the rise of the Counter-Enlightenment with French and German Romanticism respectively.

In the late 20th century, the concept of the Counter-Enlightenment was popularised by pro-Enlightenment historian Isaiah Berlin as a tradition of relativist, anti-rationalist, vitalist, and organic thinkers stemming largely from Hamann and subsequent German Romantics. While Berlin is largely credited with having refined and promoted the concept, the first known use of the term in English occurred in 1949 and there were several earlier uses of it across other European languages, including by German philosopher Friedrich Nietzsche.

== Term usage ==
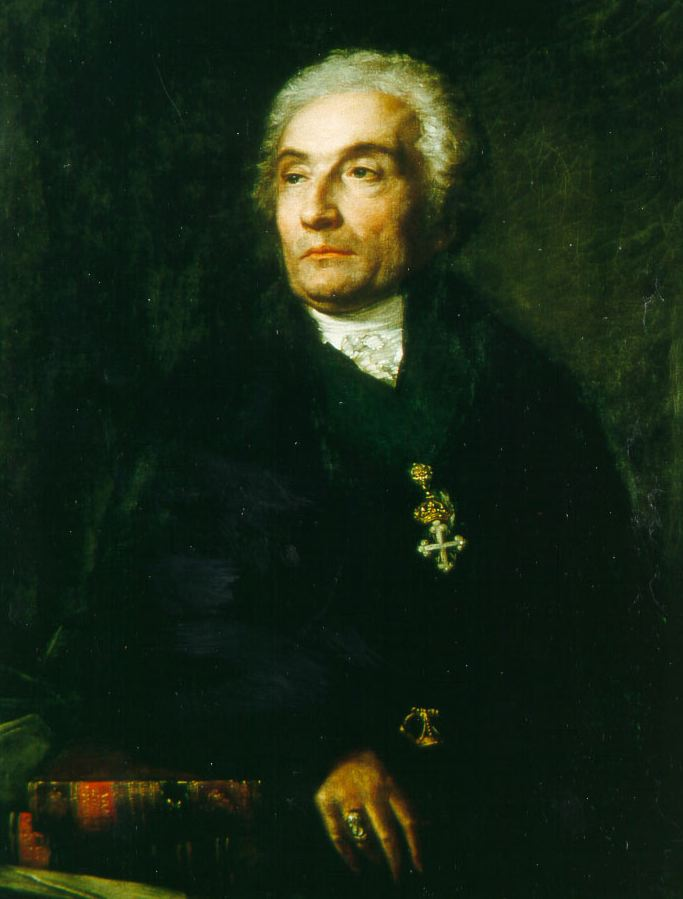
Joseph-Marie, Comte de Maistre was one of the more prominent altar-and-throne counter-revolutionaries who vehemently opposed Enlightenment ideas.

=== Early usage ===
Despite criticism of the Enlightenment being a widely discussed topic in twentieth- and twenty-first century thought, the term "Counter-Enlightenment" was slow to enter general usage. It was first mentioned briefly in English in William Barrett's 1949 article "Art, Aristocracy and Reason" in Partisan Review. He used the term again in his 1958 book on existentialism, Irrational Man; however, his comment on Enlightenment criticism was very limited. In Germany, the expression "Gegen-Aufklärung" has a longer history. It was probably coined by Friedrich Nietzsche in "Nachgelassene Fragmente" in 1877.

Lewis White Beck used this term in his Early German Philosophy (1969), a book about Counter-Enlightenment in Germany. Beck claims that there is a counter-movement arising in Germany in reaction to Frederick II's secular authoritarian state. On the other hand, Johann Georg Hamann and his fellow philosophers believe that a more organic conception of social and political life, a more vitalistic view of nature, and an appreciation for beauty and the spiritual life of man have been neglected by the eighteenth century.

=== Isaiah Berlin ===
Isaiah Berlin established this term's place in the history of ideas. He used it to refer to a movement that arose primarily in late 18th- and early 19th-century Germany against the rationalism, universalism and empiricism that are commonly associated with the Enlightenment. Berlin's essay "The Counter-Enlightenment" was first published in 1973, and later reprinted in a collection of his works, Against the Current, in 1981. The term has been more widely used since.

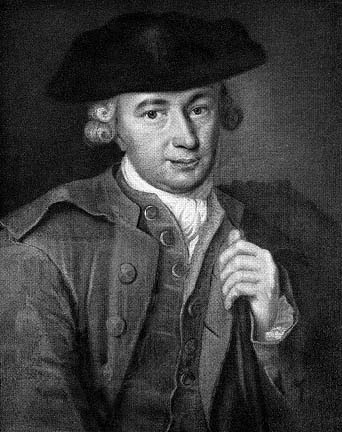
Isaiah Berlin traces the Counter-Enlightenment back to J. G. Hamann (shown).

Berlin argues that, while there were opponents of the Enlightenment outside of Germany (e.g. Joseph de Maistre) and before the 1770s (e.g. Giambattista Vico), Counter-Enlightenment thought did not take hold until the Germans "rebelled against the dead hand of France in the realms of culture, art and philosophy, and avenged themselves by launching the great counter-attack against the Enlightenment." This German reaction to the imperialistic universalism of the French Enlightenment and Revolution, which had been forced on them first by the francophile Frederick II of Prussia, then by the armies of Revolutionary France and finally by Napoleon, was crucial to the shift of consciousness that occurred in Europe at this time, leading eventually to Romanticism. The consequence of this revolt against the Enlightenment was pluralism. The opponents to the Enlightenment played a more crucial role than its proponents, some of whom were monists, whose political, intellectual and ideological offspring have been terreur and totalitarianism.

=== Darrin McMahon ===
In his book Enemies of the Enlightenment (2001), historian Darrin McMahon extends the Counter-Enlightenment back to pre-Revolutionary France and down to the level of "Grub Street". McMahon focuses on the early opponents to the Enlightenment in France, unearthing a long-forgotten "Grub Street" literature in the late 18th and early 19th centuries aimed at the philosophes. He delves into the obscure world of the "low Counter-Enlightenment" that attacked the encyclopédistes and fought to prevent the dissemination of Enlightenment ideas in the second half of the century. Many people from earlier times attacked the Enlightenment for undermining religion and the social and political order. It later became a major theme of conservative criticism of the Enlightenment. After the French Revolution, it appeared to vindicate the warnings of the anti-philosophes in the decades prior to 1789.

=== Graeme Garrard ===
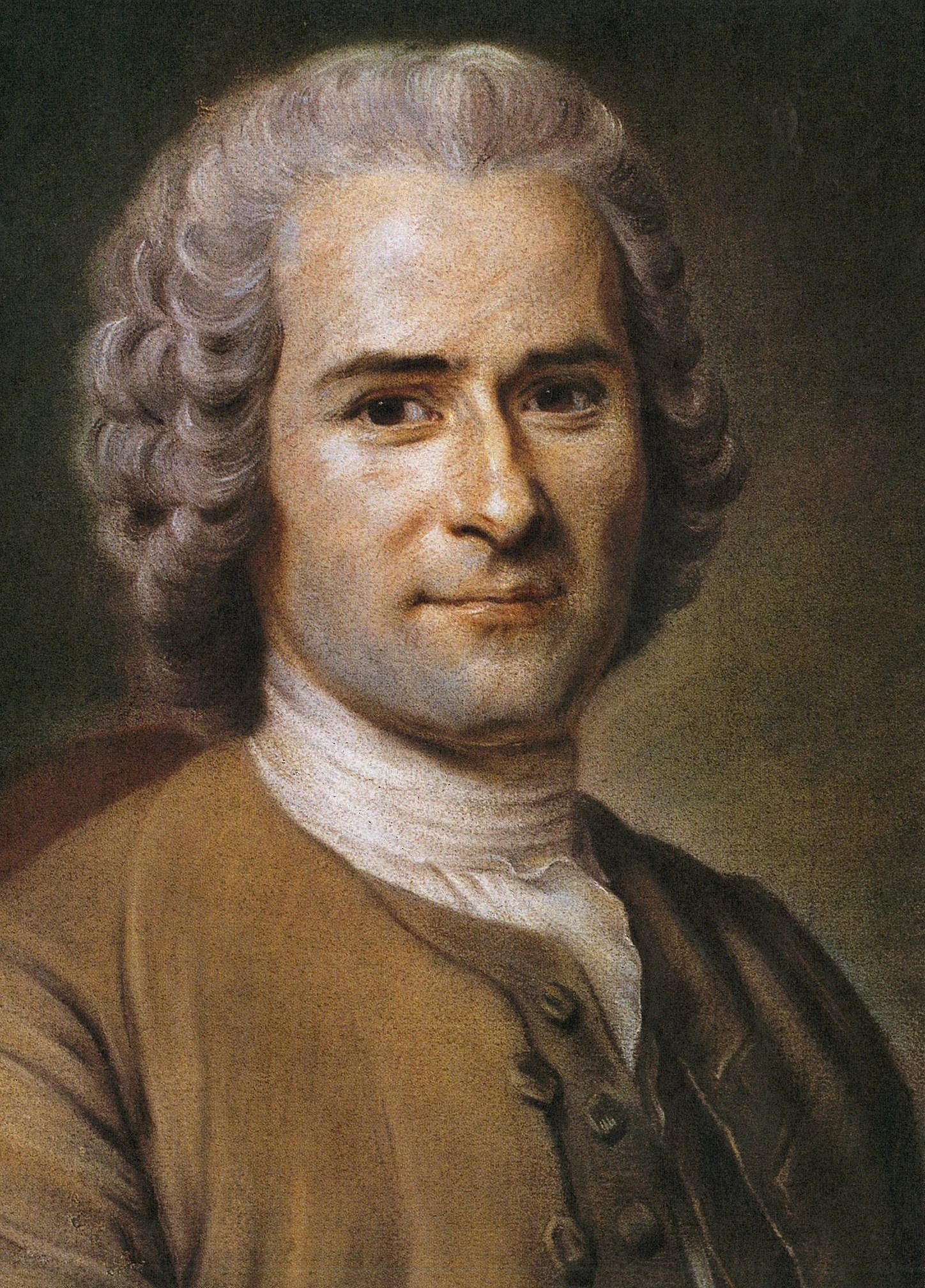
Rousseau is identified by Graeme Garrard as the originator of the Counter-Enlightenment.

Cardiff University professor Graeme Garrard claims that historian William R. Everdell was the first to situate Jean-Jacques Rousseau as the "founder of the Counter-Enlightenment" in his 1971 dissertation and in his 1987 book, Christian Apologetics in France, 1730–1790: The Roots of Romantic Religion. In his 1996 article "The Origin of the Counter-Enlightenment: Rousseau and the New Religion of Sincerity", Arthur M. Melzer traces the origin of the Counter-Enlightenment to Rousseau's religious writings, further showing Rousseau as the man who fired the first shot in the war between the Enlightenment and its opponents. Graeme Garrard follows Melzer in his "Rousseau's Counter-Enlightenment" (2003). This contradicts Berlin's depiction of Rousseau as a philosophe (albeit an erratic one) who shared the basic beliefs of his Enlightenment contemporaries. But similar to McMahon, Garrard traces the beginning of Counter-Enlightenment thought back to France and prior to the German Sturm und Drang movement of the 1770s. Garrard's book Counter-Enlightenments (2006) broadens the term even further, arguing against Berlin that there was no single "movement" called "The Counter-Enlightenment". Rather, there have been many Counter-Enlightenments, from the middle of the 18th century to the 20th century among critical theorists, postmodernists and feminists. The Enlightenment has opponents on all points of its ideological compass, from the far left to the far right, and all points in between. Each of the Enlightenment's challengers depicted it as they saw it or wanted others to see it, resulting in a vast range of portraits, many of which are not only different but incompatible.

=== James Schmidt ===
The idea of Counter-Enlightenment has evolved in the following years. The historian James Schmidt questioned the idea of "Enlightenment" and therefore of the existence of a movement opposing it. As the conception of "Enlightenment" has become more complex and difficult to maintain, so has the idea of the "Counter-Enlightenment". Advances in Enlightenment scholarship in the last quarter-century have challenged the stereotypical view of the 18th century as an "Age of Reason", leading Schmidt to speculate on whether the Enlightenment might not actually be a creation of its opponents, but the other way round. The fact that the term "Enlightenment" was first used in 1894 in English to refer to a historical period supports the argument that it was a late construction projected back onto the 18th century.

== The French Revolution ==
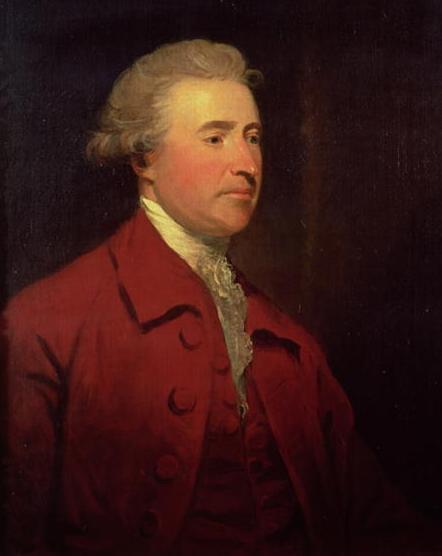
Political thinker Edmund Burke opposed the French Revolution in his Reflections on the Revolution in France.

By the mid-1790s, the Reign of Terror during the French Revolution fueled a major reaction against the Enlightenment. Many leaders of the French Revolution and their supporters made Voltaire and Rousseau, as well as Marquis de Condorcet's ideas of reason, progress, anti-clericalism, and emancipation, central themes to their movement. It led to an unavoidable backlash to the Enlightenment as there were people opposed to the revolution. Many counter-revolutionary writers, such as Edmund Burke, Joseph de Maistre and Augustin Barruel, asserted an intrinsic link between the Enlightenment and the Revolution. They blamed the Enlightenment for undermining traditional beliefs that sustained the ancien regime. As the Revolution became increasingly bloody, the idea of "Enlightenment" was discredited, too. Hence, the French Revolution and its aftermath have contributed to the development of Counter-Enlightenment thought.

Edmund Burke was among the first of the Revolution's opponents to relate the philosophes to the instability in France in the 1790s. His Reflections on the Revolution in France (1790) identifies the Enlightenment as the principal cause of the French revolution. In Burke's opinion, the philosophes provided the revolutionary leaders with the theories on which their political schemes were based.

Augustin Barruel's Counter-Enlightenment ideas were well developed before the revolution. He worked as an editor for the anti-philosophes literary journal, L'Année Littéraire. Barruel argues in his Memoirs Illustrating the History of Jacobinism (1797) that the Revolution was the consequence of a conspiracy of philosophes and freemasons.

In Considerations on France (1797), Joseph de Maistre interprets the Revolution as divine punishment for the sins of the Enlightenment. According to him, "the revolutionary storm is an overwhelming force of nature unleashed on Europe by God that mocked human pretensions."

== Romanticism ==
In the 1770s, the "Sturm und Drang" movement started in Germany. It questioned some key assumptions and implications of the Aufklärung and the term "Romanticism" was first coined. Many early Romantic writers such as Chateaubriand, Friedrich von Hardenberg (Novalis) and Samuel Taylor Coleridge inherited the Counter-Revolutionary antipathy towards the philosophes. All three directly blamed the philosophes in France and the Aufklärer in Germany for devaluing beauty, spirit and history in favour of a view of man as a soulless machine and a view of the universe as a meaningless, disenchanted void lacking richness and beauty. One particular concern to early Romantic writers was the allegedly anti-religious nature of the Enlightenment since the philosophes and Aufklärer were generally deists, opposed to revealed religion. Some historians, such as Hamann, nevertheless contend that this view of the Enlightenment as an age hostile to religion is common ground between these Romantic writers and many of their conservative Counter-Revolutionary predecessors. However, not many have commented on the Enlightenment, except for Chateaubriand, Novalis, and Coleridge, since the term itself did not exist at the time and most of their contemporaries ignored it.

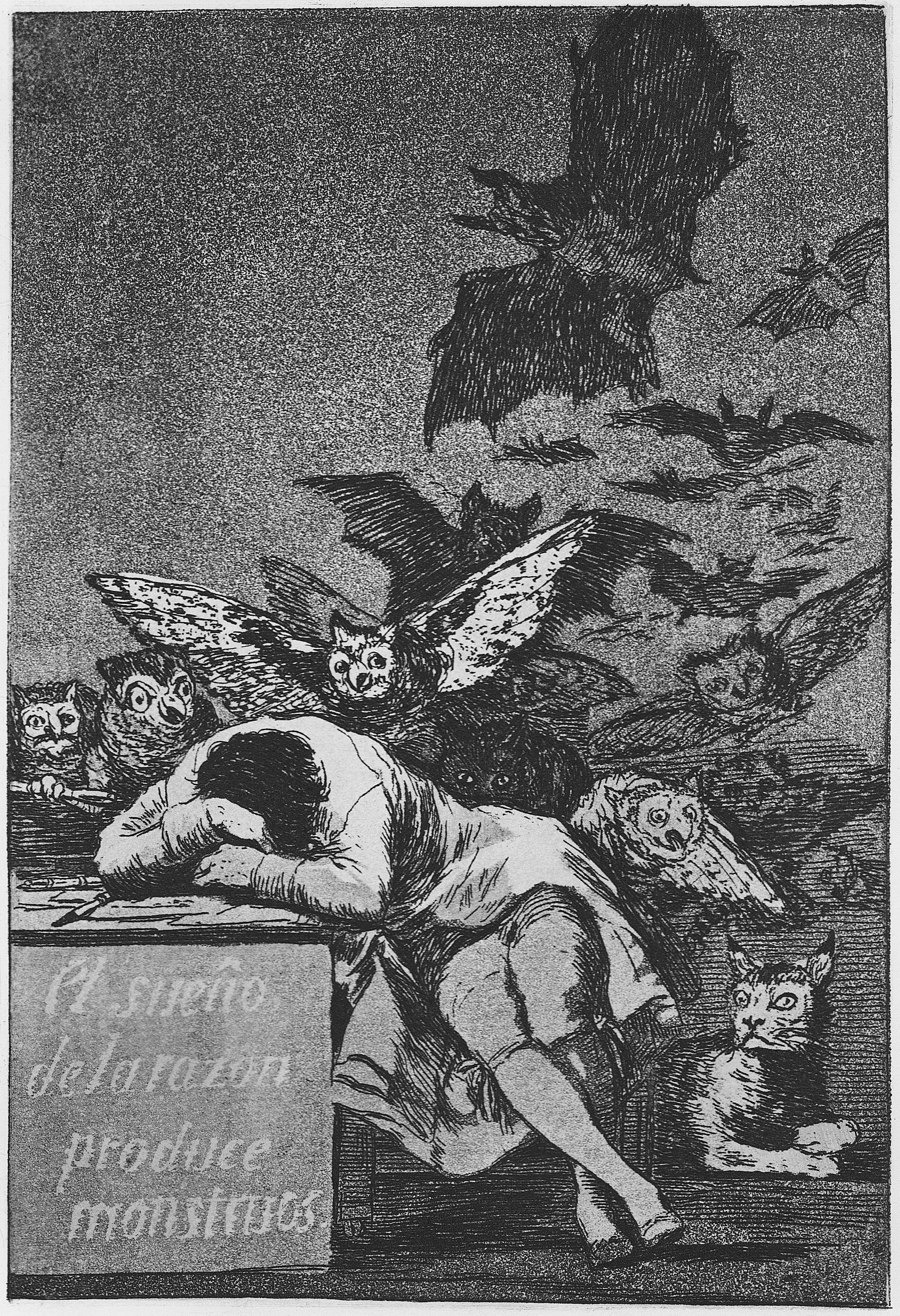
The Sleep of Reason Produces Monsters, c. 1797, 21.5 cm × 15 cm. One of the most famous prints of Spaniard Francisco Goya

The historian Jacques Barzun argues that Romanticism has its roots in the Enlightenment. It was not anti-rational, but rather balanced rationality against the competing claims of intuition and the sense of justice. This view is expressed in Goya's Sleep of Reason, in which the nightmarish owl offers the dozing social critic of Los Caprichos a piece of drawing chalk. Even the rational critic is inspired by irrational dream-content under the gaze of the sharp-eyed lynx. Marshall Brown makes much the same argument as Barzun in Romanticism and Enlightenment, questioning the stark opposition between these two periods.

By the middle of the 19th century, the memory of the French Revolution was fading and so was the influence of Romanticism. In this optimistic age of science and industry, there were few critics of the Enlightenment, and few explicit defenders. Friedrich Nietzsche is a notable and highly influential exception. After an initial defence of the Enlightenment in his so-called "middle period" (late 1870s to early 1880s), Nietzsche turned vehemently against it.

== Totalitarianism and Fascism ==
=== Totalitarianism as a product of the Enlightenment ===
After World War II, the Enlightenment re-emerged as a key organizing concept in social and political thought and the history of ideas, often suggesting links between counter-enlightenment ideas and fascism.

There was also, conversely, new counter-enlightenment literature, blaming the 18th-century Age of Reason for totalitarianism. The locus classicus of this view is Max Horkheimer and Theodor Adorno's Dialectic of Enlightenment (1947). Adorno and Horkheimer take "enlightenment" as their target including the specifically 18th-century form, – i.e. "The Enlightenment". Dialectic of Enlightenment traces the degeneration of the general concept of enlightenment, from ancient Greece (epitomized by the cunning "bourgeois" hero Odysseus) to 20th-century fascism. Adorno and Horkheimer claim that the Enlightenment is epitomized by the Marquis de Sade. However, some philosophers have rejected Adorno and Horkheimer's claim that Sade's moral skepticism is actually coherent, or that it reflects Enlightenment thought.

=== Nazism and Fascism as products of the Counter-Enlightenment ===
Many historians and other scholars have argued that fascism was a product of the Counter-Enlightenment itself. For example, Ze'ev Sternhell called fascism "an exacerbated form of the tradition of counter-Enlightenment": with fascism, "Europe created for the first time a set of political movements and regimes whose project was nothing but the destruction of Enlightenment culture." Similar opinions were expressed by such historians as Georges Bensoussan and Enzo Traverso, who noted "Counter-Enlightenment tendencies, combined with industrial and technical progress, a state monopoly over violence, and the rationalisation of methods of domination" and "Counter-Enlightenment (Gegenaufklärung) and the cult of modern technology, a synthesis of Teutonic mythologies and biological nationalism" in Nazism, thus recognizing it as grounded on intellectual traditions of counter-Enlightenment, but mixing them with "instrumental reason" which allowed adopting "the methods of industrial production and scientific management were employed" for such irrational goals as racial extermination. Prior to these historians, various philosophers described fascism as a "revolt against reason" and a force hostile to scientific objectivity and rational inqury, namely Umberto Eco, Bertrand Russell, Richard Wolin and Jason Stanley.

== Related ==
=== People ===
- Adam Müller
- Alasdair MacIntyre
- Aleksandr Dugin
- Alexander von Humboldt
- Ananda Coomaraswamy
- Augustin Barruel
- Charles Taylor
- Chateaubriand
- Darrin McMahon
- Edmund Burke
- Erik von Kühnelt-Leddihn
- Ernst Jünger
- Emil Cioran
- Friedrich Heinrich Jacobi
- Friedrich Nietzsche
- Francis Parker Yockey
- Henri de Saint-Simon
- Panagiotis Kondylis
- Vincenzo Cuoco
- Monaldo Leopardi
- Giacomo Leopardi
- Giambattista Vico
- Graeme Garrard
- Jean-Jacques Lefranc de Pompignan
- Johann Gottlieb Fichte
- Johann Georg Hamann
- Johann Gottfried Herder
- John N. Gray
- Joseph de Maistre
- Martin Heidegger
- Walter Benjamin
- Lewis White Beck
- Leo Strauss
- Léon Bloy
- Louis de Bonald
- Louis Althusser
- Ludwig Klages
- Carl Schmitt
- Norbert Elias
- Novalis
- Nick Land
- Oswald Spengler
- Juan Donoso Cortés
- Søren Kierkegaard
- Voltaire
- Thomas Carlyle (Note: It is difficult to label Carlyle's thought, but his famous concept of Hero-Worship as well as his somewhat critical analysis of the French Revolution links him with the Counter-Enlightenment.)
- Theodor W. Adorno
- Julius Evola
- Jacques Derrida
- Gilles Deleuze
- Giorgio Agamben
- Georges Bataille
- Georges Sorel
- Pierre Klossowski
- Charles Maurras
- René Guénon
- Curtis Yarvin
- Reinhart Koselleck
- Alain de Benoist

=== Ideologies ===
- Anti-intellectualism
- Antiscience
- Dark Enlightenment (Neo-reactionary movement)
- Natural philosophy
- Lebensphilosophie
- Reactionary

=== Works ===
- Dialectic of Enlightenment
- Critique and Crisis
