= Isaiah Berlin =

British philosopher (1909–1997)

Sir Isaiah Berlin OM CBE FBA
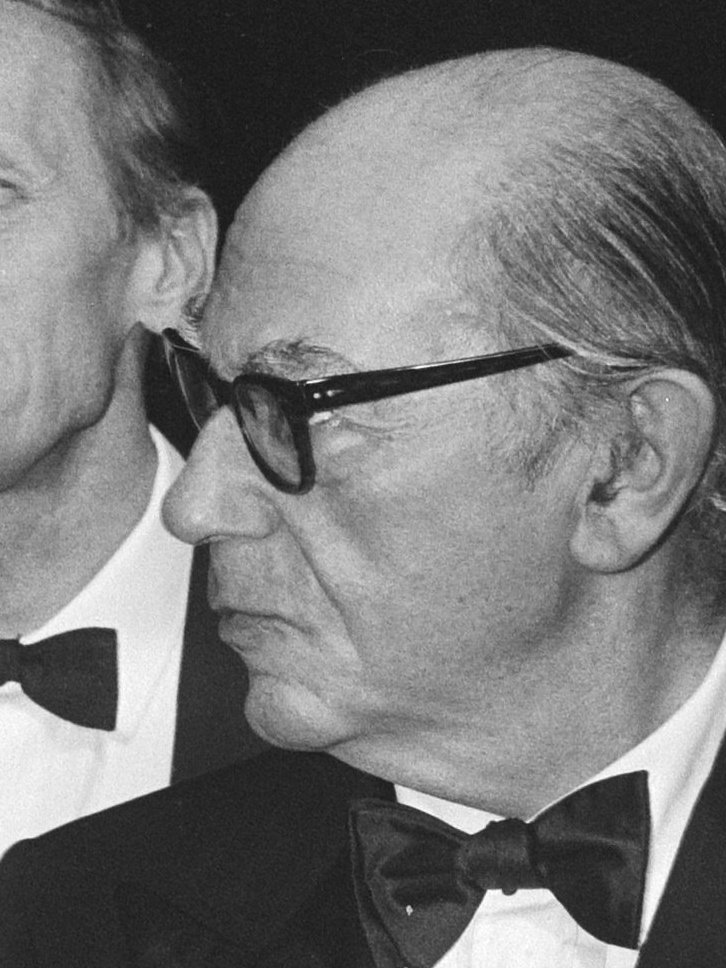
- Berlin in 1983
- Born: 6 June 1909; Riga, Governorate of Livonia, Russian Empire
- Died: 5 November 1997 (aged 88); Oxford, England
- Spouse: Aline de Gunzbourg (m. 1956)
- Children: 3 (stepsons)

Education
- Education: Corpus Christi College, Oxford

Philosophical work
- Era: 20th-century philosophy
- Region: Western philosophy
- School: Analytic; liberalism
- Institutions: New College, Oxford; All Souls College, Oxford; Wolfson College, Oxford
- Doctoral students: Frederick C. Beiser; James H. Billington; David McLellan; Larry Siedentop; Yuli Tamir; Charles Taylor
- Notable students: Marshall Berman; Norman O. Brown; G. A. Cohen; Bob Rae
- Main interests: Political philosophy; philosophy of history; history of ideas; ethics; Marxism; modern history; Russian history; Russian literature; Romanticism
- Notable works: "Two Concepts of Liberty"
- Notable ideas: The negative/positive liberty distinction; Counter-Enlightenment; value pluralism

Sir Isaiah Berlin (6 June 1909 – 5 November 1997) was a British social and political theorist, philosopher, and historian of ideas.

Born into a Russian-Jewish family in Riga, he moved to Petrograd at the age of six, where he witnessed the Russian Revolution. In 1921, his family moved to England, and he was educated at St Paul's School, London and Corpus Christi College, Oxford. In 1932, at the age of 23, he was elected to a prize fellowship at All Souls College, Oxford. In addition to his own output, he translated works by Ivan Turgenev from Russian into English. During the Second World War, he worked for the British Diplomatic Service.

From 1957 to 1967 Berlin was Chichele Professor of Social and Political Theory at the University of Oxford. He was the president of the Aristotelian Society from 1963 to 1964. In 1966, he played a role in creating Wolfson College, Oxford, and became its founding president. Berlin was appointed a CBE in 1946, knighted in 1957, and appointed to the Order of Merit in 1971. He was the president of the British Academy from 1974 to 1978. He also received the 1979 Jerusalem Prize for his lifelong defence of civil liberties, and in 1994 he received the honorary degree of Doctor of Laws at the University of Toronto, for which occasion he prepared a "short credo" (as he called it in a letter to a friend), now known as "A Message to the Twenty-First Century", to be read on his behalf at the ceremony.

Although he became increasingly averse to writing for publication, his improvised lectures and talks were sometimes recorded and transcribed, and many of his spoken words were converted into published essays and books, both by himself and by others, especially by his principal editor from 1974, Henry Hardy. Annual Isaiah Berlin Lectures are held, in Oxford, at Hampstead Synagogue, at Wolfson College, Oxford and at the Taylor Institute (organised by Italian Studies at Oxford), at the British Academy, and in Riga. Berlin's work on liberal theory and on value pluralism, as well as his opposition to Marxism and communism, has had a lasting influence.

== Early life ==
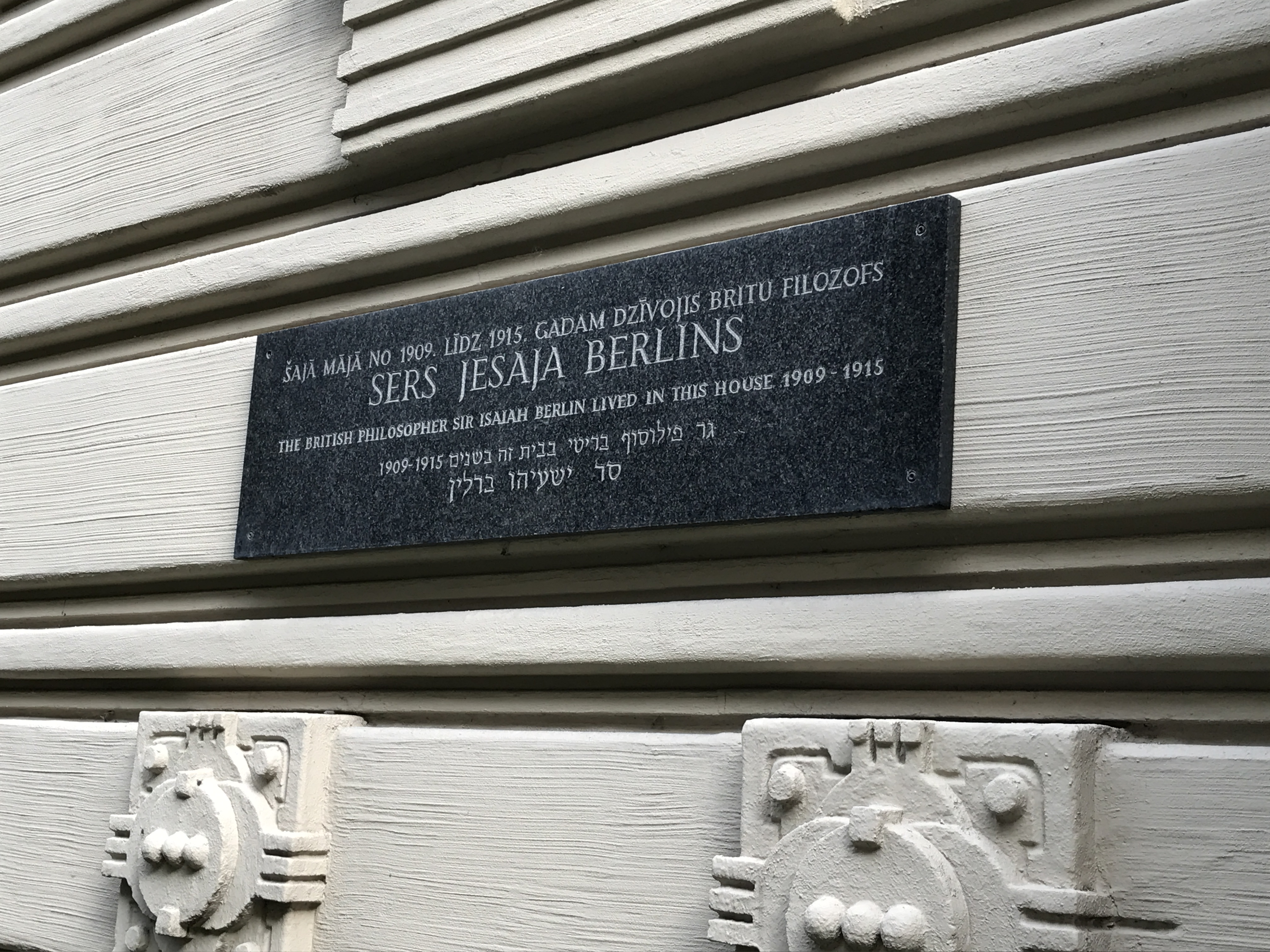
Plaque marking what was once Berlin's childhood home (designed by Mikhail Eisenstein) in Riga, engraved in Latvian, English, and Hebrew with the tribute "The British philosopher Sir Isaiah Berlin lived in this house 1909–1915"

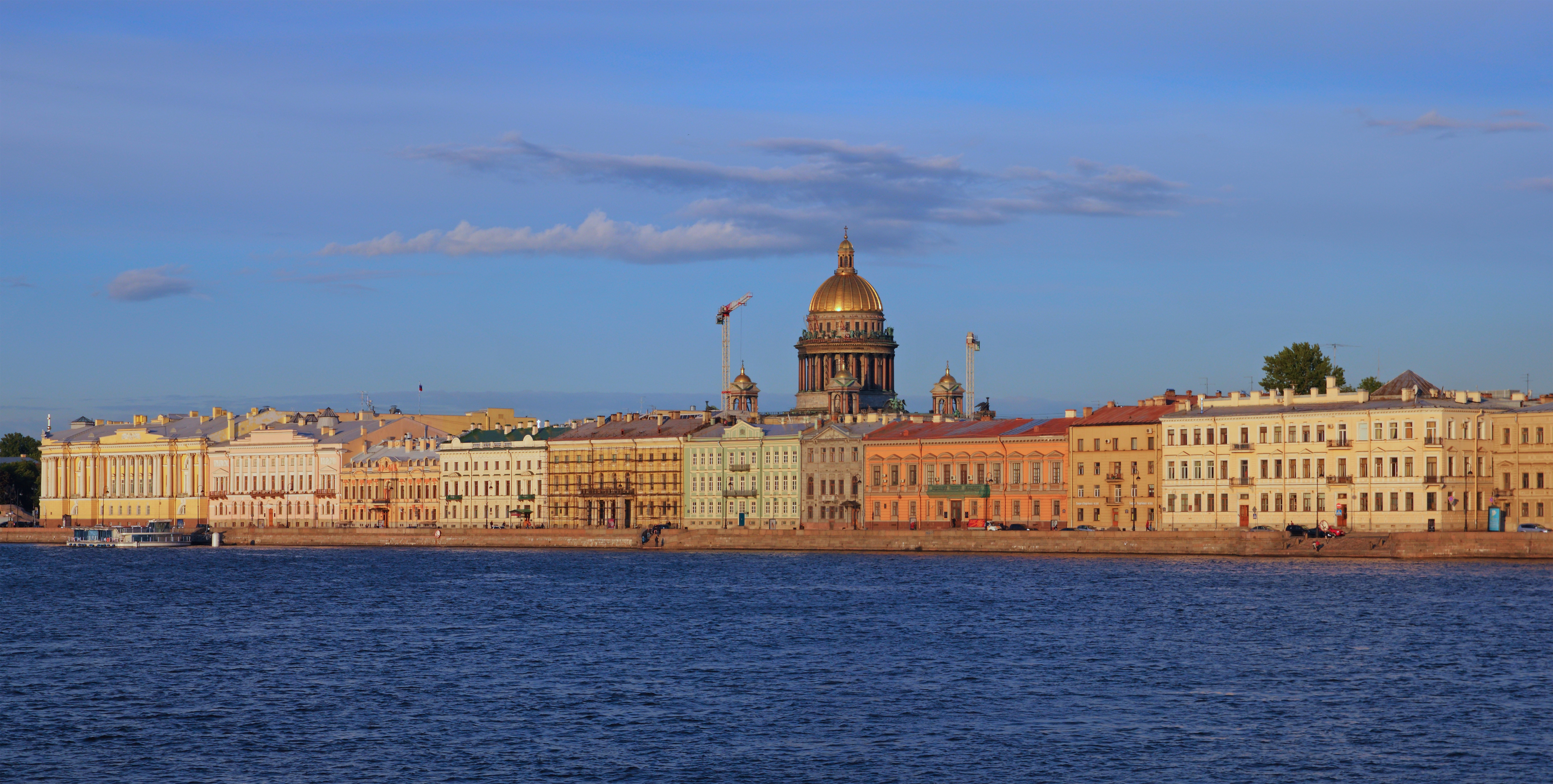
The Angliyskaya Embankment in Saint Petersburg, where Berlin lived as a child during the Russian Revolutions

Isaiah Berlin was born in Riga (present-day Latvia) on 6 June 1909 into a wealthy Jewish family, the only son of Mendel Berlin, a timber trader (and a direct descendant of Shneur Zalman, founder of Chabad Hasidism), and his wife Marie (née Volshonok). His family owned a timber company, one of the largest in the Baltics, as well as forests in Russia, from where the timber was floated down the Daugava river to its sawmills in Riga. As his father, who was the head of the Riga Association of Timber Merchants, worked for the company in its dealings with Western companies, he was fluent not only in Yiddish, Russian, and German, but also in French and English. His Russian-speaking mother, Marie (Musya) Volshonok, was also fluent in Yiddish and Latvian. Isaiah Berlin spent his first six years in Riga, and later lived in Andreapol (a small timber town near Pskov, effectively owned by the family business), and then in Petrograd (now St. Petersburg). In Petrograd, the family lived first on Vasilevsky Island and then on Angliiskii Prospekt on the mainland. On Angliiskii Prospekt, they shared their building with other tenants, including an assistant Minister of Finnish affairs named Ivanov, Princess Emeretinsky, and the composer Maximilian Steinberg with his wife Nadezhda Rimskaya-Korsakova, the daughter of Nikolai Rimsky-Korsakov. With the onset of the October Revolution of 1917, the fortunes of the building's tenants were rapidly reversed, with both Princess Emeretinsky and Rimsky-Korsakov's daughter soon being made to stoke the building's stoves and sweep the yards. Berlin witnessed the February and October Revolutions both from his apartment windows and from walks in the city with his governess, where he recalled the crowds of protesters marching on the Winter Palace Square.

One particular childhood memory of the February Revolution marked his lifelong opposition to violence, with Berlin saying:

Well I was seven and a half and something, and then I was – did I tell you the terrible sight of the policeman being dragged – not policeman, a sharp shooter from the rooftop – being dragged away by a lynching bee […] In the early parts of the revolution, the only people who remained loyal to the Tsar was the police, the Pharaon, I've never seen [the term] Pharaon in the histories of the Russian Revolution. They existed, and they did sniping from the rooftops or attics. I saw a man like that, a Pharaon […]. That's not in the books, but it is true. And they sniped at the revolutionaries from roofs or attics and things. And this man was dragged down, obviously, by a crowd, and was being obviously taken to a not very agreeable fate, and I saw this man struggling in the middle of a crowd of about twenty […] [T]hat gave me a permanent horror of violence which has remained with me for the rest of my life.

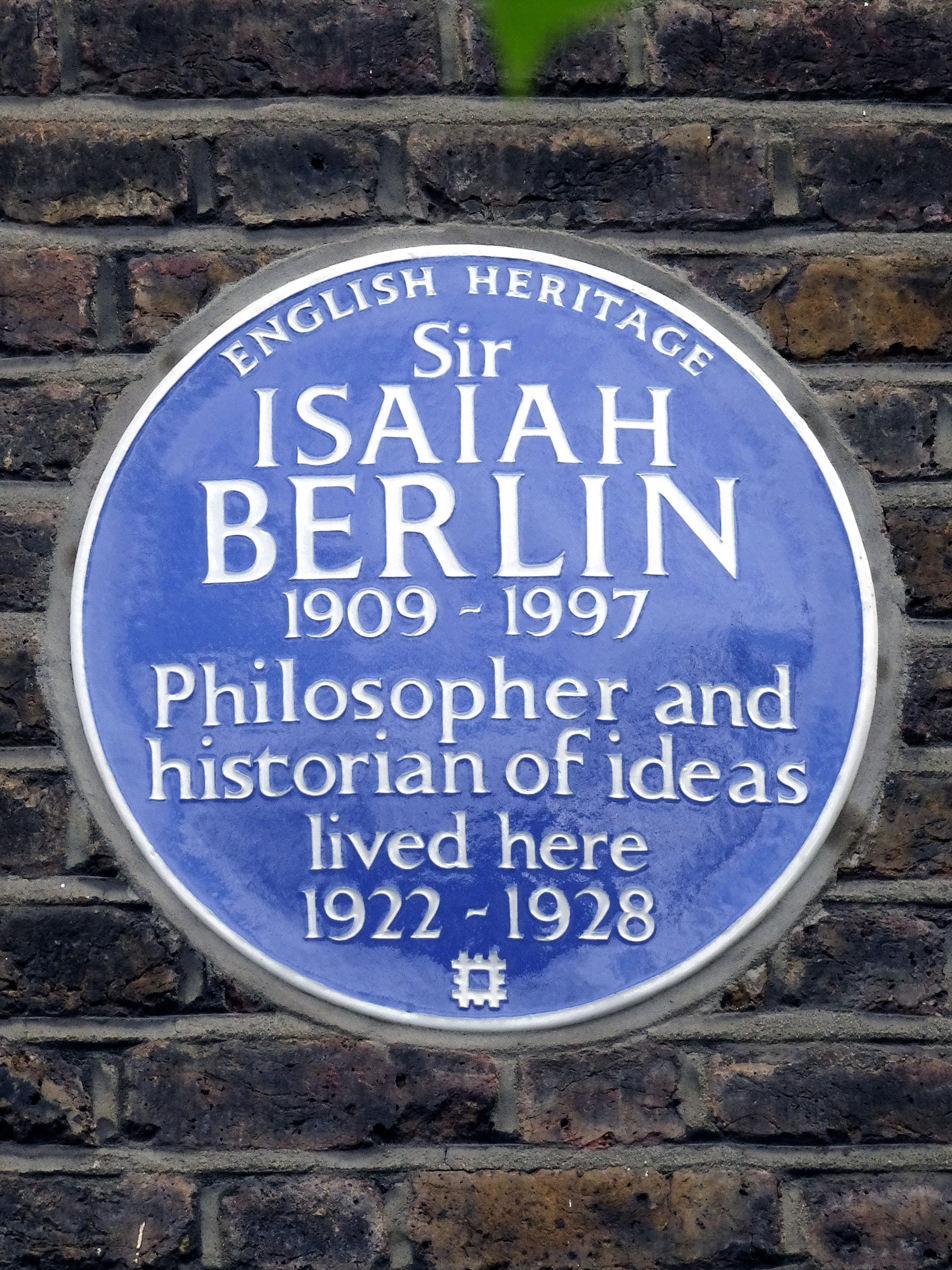
English Heritage blue plaque at 33 Upper Addison Gardens, Holland Park, London

Feeling increasingly oppressed by life under Bolshevik rule, which identified the family as bourgeoisie, the family left Petrograd, on 5 October 1920, for Riga, but encounters with antisemitism and difficulties with the Latvian authorities convinced them to leave, and they moved to Britain in early 1921 (Mendel in January, Isaiah and Marie at the beginning of February), when Berlin was 11. In London the family first stayed in Surbiton where he was sent to Arundel House for preparatory school, then within the year they bought a house in Kensington and six years later in Hampstead.

Berlin's native language was Russian, and his English was virtually nonexistent at first, but he reached proficiency in English within a year at around the age of 12. In addition to Russian and English, Berlin was fluent in French, German, and Italian, and he knew Hebrew, Latin and Ancient Greek. Despite his fluency in English, however, in later life Berlin's Oxford English accent would sound increasingly Russian in its vowel sounds. Whenever he was described as an English philosopher, Berlin always insisted that he was not an English philosopher, but would forever be a Russian Jew: "I am a Russian Jew from Riga, and all my years in England cannot change this. I love England, I have been well treated here, and I cherish many things about English life, but I am a Russian Jew; that is how I was born and that is who I will be to the end of my life."

== Education ==
Berlin was educated at St Paul's School in London. According to Michael Bonavia, a British author (and son of Ferruccio Bonavia) who was at school with him, he

made astonishing feats in the school's Junior Debating Society and the School Union Society. The rapid, even flow of his ideas, the succession of confident references to authors whom most of his contemporaries had never heard, left them mildly stupefied. Yet there was no backlash, no resentment at these breathless marathons, because Berlin's essential modesty and good manners eliminated jealousy and disarmed hostility.

After leaving St Paul's, Berlin applied to Balliol College, Oxford, but was denied admission after a chaotic interview. Berlin decided to apply again, only to a different college: Corpus Christi College, Oxford. Berlin was admitted and commenced his literae humaniores degree. He graduated in 1928, taking first-class honours in his final examinations and winning the John Locke Prize for his performance in the philosophy papers, in which he outscored A. J. Ayer. He subsequently took another degree at Oxford in philosophy, politics and economics, again taking first-class honours after less than a year on the course. He was appointed a tutor in philosophy at New College, Oxford, and soon afterwards was elected to a prize fellowship at All Souls College, Oxford, the first unconverted Jew to achieve this fellowship at All Souls.

While still a student, he befriended Ayer (with whom he was to share a lifelong amicable rivalry), Stuart Hampshire, Richard Wollheim, Maurice Bowra, Roy Beddington, Stephen Spender, Inez Pearn, J. L. Austin, and Nicolas Nabokov. In 1940 he presented a philosophical paper on other minds to a meeting attended by Ludwig Wittgenstein at Cambridge University. Wittgenstein rejected the argument of his paper in discussion but praised Berlin for his intellectual honesty and integrity. Berlin was to remain at Oxford for the rest of his life, apart from a period working for British Information Services (BIS) in New York City from 1940 to 1942 and for the British embassies in Washington, D.C., and Moscow from then until 1946. Before crossing the Atlantic in 1940, Berlin took rest in Portugal for a few days. He stayed in Estoril, at the Hotel Palácio, between 19 and 24 October 1940. Prior to this service, however, Berlin was barred from participation in the British war effort as a result of his being born in Latvia, and because his left arm had been damaged at birth. In April 1943 he wrote a confidential analysis of members of the Senate Foreign Relations Committee for the Foreign Office; he described Senator Arthur Capper from Kansas as "a solid, stolid, 78-year-old reactionary from the corn belt, who is the very voice of Mid-Western "grass root" isolationism." For his services, he was appointed a CBE in the 1946 New Year Honours. Meetings with Anna Akhmatova in Leningrad in November 1945 and January 1946 had a powerful effect on both of them, and serious repercussions for Akhmatova (who immortalised the meetings in her poetry).

== Personal life ==
In 1956 Berlin married Aline Elisabeth Yvonne Halban, née de Gunzbourg (1915–2014), the former wife of the nuclear physicist Hans von Halban, and a former winner of the ladies' golf championship of France. She was from an exiled half Russian-aristocratic and half ennobled-Jewish banking and petroleum family (her mother was Yvonne Deutsch de la Meurthe and her grandfather was Emile Deutsch de la Meurthe, brother of Henri Deutsch de la Meurthe) based in Paris.

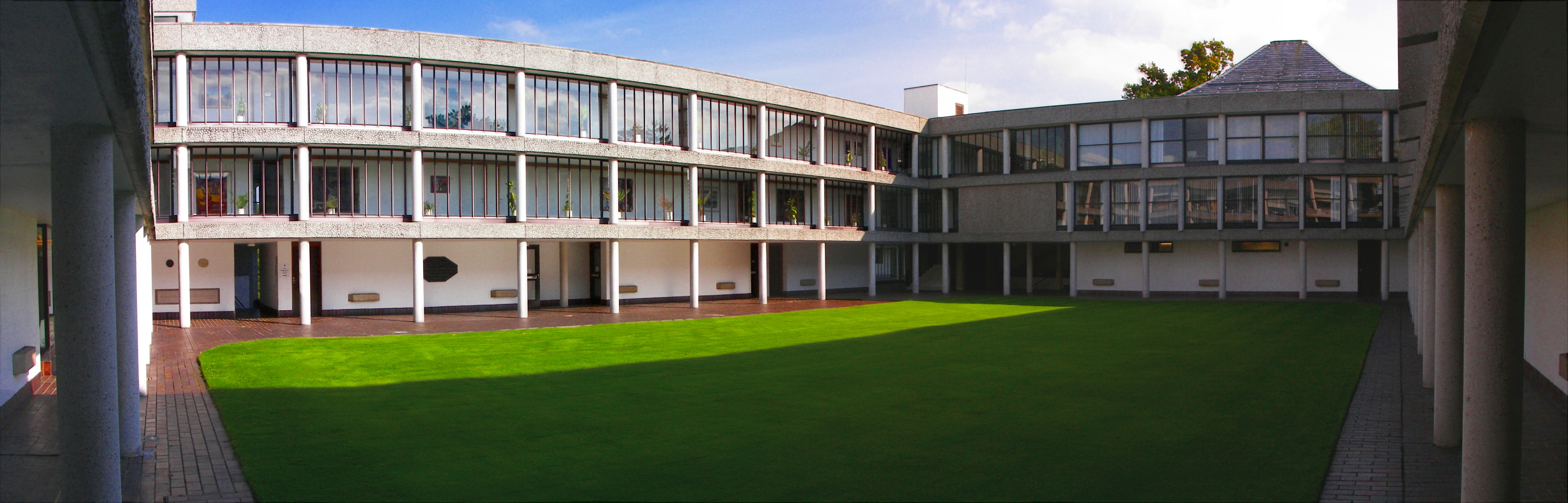
The Berlin Quadrangle, Wolfson College

He was elected a Foreign Honorary Member of the American Academy of Arts and Sciences in 1959, and a member of the American Philosophical Society in 1975. He was instrumental in the founding, in 1966, of a new graduate college at Oxford University: Wolfson College. The college was founded to be a centre of academic excellence which, unlike many other colleges at Oxford, would also be based on a strong egalitarian and democratic ethos. Berlin was a member of the Founding Council of the Rothermere American Institute at Oxford University. As later revealed, when he was asked to evaluate the academic credentials of Isaac Deutscher, Isaiah Berlin argued against a promotion, because of the profoundly pro-communist militancy of the candidate.

Berlin died in Oxford on 5 November 1997, aged 88. He is buried there in Wolvercote Cemetery. On his death, the obituarist of The Independent wrote: "he was a man of formidable intellectual power with a rare gift for understanding a wide range of human motives, hopes and fears, and a prodigiously energetic capacity for enjoyment – of life, of people in all their variety, of their ideas and idiosyncrasies, of literature, of music, of art". The same publication reported: "Isaiah Berlin was often described, especially in his old age, by means of superlatives: the world's greatest talker, the century's most inspired reader, one of the finest minds of our time. There is no doubt that he showed in more than one direction the unexpectedly large possibilities open to us at the top end of the range of human potential." The front page of The New York Times concluded: "His was an exuberant life crowded with joys – the joy of thought, the joy of music, the joy of good friends. ... The theme that runs throughout his work is his concern with liberty and the dignity of human beings ... Sir Isaiah radiated well-being."

Berlin's nephew is Efraim Halevy (Hebrew: אפרים הלוי), Israeli intelligence expert and diplomat, advisor to Ariel Sharon, 9th director of the Mossad and the 3rd head of the Israeli National Security Council.

== Thought ==
Though like Our Lord and Socrates he does not publish much, he thinks and says a great deal and has had an enormous influence on our times

— Maurice Bowra on Isaiah Berlin's publishing record.

=== Lecturing and composition ===
Berlin did not enjoy writing, and his published work (including both his essays and books) was produced through dictation to a tape recorder, or by the transcription of his improvised lectures and talks from recorded tapes. The work of transcribing his spoken word often placed a strain on his secretaries. This reliance on dictation extended to his letters, which were recorded on a Grundig tape recorder. He would often dictate these letters while simultaneously conversing with friends, and his secretary would then transcribe them. At times, the secretary would inadvertently include the author's jokes and laughter in the transcribed text. The product of this unique methodology was a writing style that mimicked his spoken discourse—animated, quick, and constantly jumping from one idea to another. His everyday conversation was vividly mirrored in his works, complete with intricate grammar and punctuation.

=== "Two Concepts of Liberty" ===
Berlin is known for his inaugural lecture, "Two Concepts of Liberty", delivered in 1958 as Chichele Professor of Social and Political Theory at Oxford. The lecture, later published as an essay, reintroduced the study of political philosophy to the methods of analytic philosophy. Berlin defined "negative liberty" as absence of coercion or interference in private actions by an external political body, which Berlin derived from the Hobbesian definition of liberty. "Positive liberty", Berlin maintained, could be thought of as self-mastery, which asks not what we are free from, but what we are free to do. Berlin contended that modern political thinkers often conflated positive liberty with rational action, based upon a rational knowledge to which, it is argued, only a certain elite or social group has access. This rationalist conflation was open to political abuses, which encroached on negative liberty, when such interpretations of positive liberty were, in the nineteenth century, used to defend nationalism, paternalism, social engineering, historicism, and collective rational control over human destiny.

=== Counter-Enlightenment ===
Berlin's lectures on the Enlightenment and its critics (especially Giambattista Vico, Johann Gottfried Herder, Joseph de Maistre and Johann Georg Hamann, to whose views Berlin referred as the Counter-Enlightenment) contributed to his advocacy of an irreducibly pluralist ethical ontology. In Three Critics of the Enlightenment, Berlin argues that Hamann was one of the first thinkers to conceive of human cognition as language – the articulation and use of symbols. Berlin saw Hamann as having recognised as the rationalist's Cartesian fallacy the notion that there are "clear and distinct" ideas "which can be contemplated by a kind of inner eye", without the use of language – a recognition greatly sharpened in the 20th century by Wittgenstein's private language argument.

=== Value pluralism ===
For Berlin, values are creations of mankind, rather than products of nature waiting to be discovered. He argued, on the basis of the epistemic and empathetic access we have to other cultures across history, that the nature of mankind is such that certain values – the importance of individual liberty, for instance – will hold true across cultures, and this is what he meant by objective pluralism. Berlin's argument was partly grounded in Ludwig Wittgenstein's later theory of language, which argued that inter-translatability was supervenient on a similarity in forms of life, with the inverse implication that our epistemic access to other cultures entails an ontologically contiguous value-structure.

With his account of value pluralism, Berlin proposed the view that moral values may be equally, or rather incommensurably, valid and yet incompatible, and may, therefore, come into conflict with one another in a way that admits of no resolution without reference to particular contexts of a decision. When values clash, it may not be that one is more important than the other: keeping a promise may conflict with the pursuit of truth; liberty may clash with social justice. Moral conflicts are "an intrinsic, irremovable element in human life". "These collisions of values are of the essence of what they are and what we are." For Berlin, this clashing of incommensurate values within, no less than between, individuals constitutes the tragedy of human life. Alan Brown suggests, however, that Berlin ignores the fact that values are commensurable in the extent to which they contribute to the human good.

=== "The Hedgehog and the Fox" ===
"The Hedgehog and the Fox", a title referring to a fragment of the ancient Greek poet Archilochus, was one of Berlin's most popular essays with the general public, reprinted in numerous editions. Of the classification that gives the essay its title, Berlin once said "I never meant it very seriously. I meant it as a kind of enjoyable intellectual game, but it was taken seriously."

Berlin expands upon this idea to divide writers and thinkers into two categories: hedgehogs, who view the world through the lens of a single defining idea (examples given include Plato), and foxes, who draw on a wide variety of experiences and for whom the world cannot be boiled down to a single idea (examples given include Aristotle).

=== Positive liberty ===
Berlin promoted the notion of "positive liberty" in the sense of an intrinsic link between positive freedom and participatory, Athenian-style democracy. There is a contrast with "negative liberty." Liberals in the English-speaking tradition call for negative liberty, meaning a realm of private autonomy from which the state is legally excluded. In contrast French liberals ever since the French Revolution more often promote "positive liberty" – that is, liberty insofar as it is tethered to collectively defined ends. They praise the state as an essential tool to emancipate the people.

=== Other work ===
Berlin's lecture "Historical Inevitability" (1954) focused on a controversy in the philosophy of history. Given the choice, whether one believes that "the lives of entire peoples and societies have been decisively influenced by exceptional individuals" or, conversely, that whatever happens occurs as a result of impersonal forces oblivious to human intentions, Berlin rejected both options and the choice itself as nonsensical.

Berlin is also well known for his writings on Russian intellectual history, most of which are collected in Russian Thinkers (1978; 2nd ed. 2008) and edited, as most of Berlin's work, by Henry Hardy (in the case of this volume, jointly with Aileen Kelly). Berlin also contributed a number of essays on leading intellectuals and political figures of his time, including Winston Churchill, Franklin Delano Roosevelt and Chaim Weizmann. Eighteen of these character sketches were published together as Personal Impressions (1980; 2nd ed., with four additional essays, 1998; 3rd ed., with a further ten essays, 2014).

== Commemoration ==
A number of commemorative events for Isaiah Berlin are held at Oxford University, as well as scholarships given out in his name, including the Wolfson Isaiah Berlin Clarendon Scholarship, The Isaiah Berlin Visiting Professorship, and the annual Isaiah Berlin Lectures. The Berlin Quadrangle of Wolfson College, Oxford, is named after him. The Isaiah Berlin Association of Latvia was founded in 2011 to promote the ideas and values of Sir Isaiah Berlin, in particular by organising an annual Isaiah Berlin day and lectures in his memory. At the British Academy, the Isaiah Berlin lecture series has been held since 2001. Many volumes from Berlin's personal library were donated to Ben-Gurion University of the Negev in Beer Sheva and form part of the Aranne Library collection. The Isaiah Berlin Room, on the third floor of the library, is a replica of his study at the University of Oxford. There is also the Isaiah Berlin Society which takes place at his alma mater of St Paul's School. The society invites world famous academics to share their research into the answers to life's great concerns and to respond to students' questions. In the last few years they have hosted: A.C. Grayling, Brad Hooker, Jonathan Dancy, John Cottingham, Tim Crane, Arif Ahmed, Hugh Mellor and David Papineau.

== Published works ==
Apart from Unfinished Dialogue, all books/editions listed from 1978 onwards are edited (or, where stated, co-edited) by Henry Hardy, and all but Karl Marx are compilations or transcripts of lectures, essays, and letters. Details given are of first and latest UK editions, and current US editions. Most titles are also available as e-books. The twelve titles marked with a '+' are available in the US market in revised editions from Princeton University Press, with additional material by Berlin, and (except in the case of Karl Marx) new forewords by contemporary authors; the 5th edition of Karl Marx is also available in the UK.

- +Karl Marx: His Life and Environment, Thornton Butterworth, 1939. 5th ed., Karl Marx, 2013, Princeton University Press. ISBN 978-0691156507.
- The Age of Enlightenment: The Eighteenth-Century Philosophers, New American Library, 1956. Out of print. Second edition (2017) available online only.
- +The Hedgehog and the Fox: An Essay on Tolstoy's View of History, Weidenfeld & Nicolson, London, 1953. 2nd ed., 2014, Phoenix. ISBN 978-1780228433. 2nd US ed., Princeton University Press, 2013. ISBN 978-1400846634.
- Four Essays on Liberty, Oxford University Press, 1969. Superseded by Liberty.
- Vico and Herder: Two Studies in the History of Ideas, Chatto and Windus, 1976. Superseded by Three Critics of the Enlightenment.
- Russian Thinkers (edited by Henry Hardy and Aileen Kelly), Hogarth Press, 1978. 2nd ed. (revised by Henry Hardy), Penguin, 2008. ISBN 978-0141442204.
- +Concepts and Categories: Philosophical Essays, Hogarth Press, 1978. Pimlico. ISBN 978-0712665520. 2nd ed., 2013, Princeton University Press. ISBN 978-0691157498.
- +Against the Current: Essays in the History of Ideas, Hogarth Press, 1979. Pimlico. ISBN 978-0712666909. 2nd ed., 2013, Princeton University Press.
- +Personal Impressions, Hogarth Press, 1980. 2nd ed., Pimlico, 1998. ISBN 978-0712666015. 3rd ed., 2014, Princeton University Press. ISBN 978-0691157702.
- +The Crooked Timber of Humanity: Chapters in the History of Ideas, John Murray, 1990. 2nd ed., Pimlico, 2013. ISBN 978-1845952082. 2nd ed., 2013, Princeton University Press. ISBN 978-0691155937.
- The Magus of the North: J. G. Hamann and the Origins of Modern Irrationalism, John Murray, 1993. Superseded by Three Critics of the Enlightenment.
- +The Sense of Reality: Studies in Ideas and their History, Chatto & Windus, 1996. Pimlico. ISBN 978-0712673679. 2nd ed., 2019, Princeton University Press. ISBN 978-0691182872.
- The Proper Study of Mankind: An Anthology of Essays (edited by Henry Hardy and Roger Hausheer) [a one-volume selection from the whole of Berlin's work], Chatto & Windus, 1997. 2nd ed., Vintage, 2013. ISBN 978-0099582762.
- +The Roots of Romanticism (lectures delivered in 1965), Chatto & Windus, 1999. [imlico. ISBN 978-0712665445. 2nd ed., 2013, Princeton University Press. ISBN 978-0691156200.
- +Three Critics of the Enlightenment: Vico, Hamann, Herder, Pimlico, 2000. 2nd ed., 2013. ISBN 978-1845952136. 2nd ed., 2013, Princeton University Press. ISBN 978-0691157658.
- +The Power of Ideas, Chatto & Windus, 2000. Pimlico. ISBN 978-0712665544. 2nd ed., 2013, Princeton University Press. ISBN 978-0691157603.
- +Freedom and Its Betrayal: Six Enemies of Human Liberty (lectures delivered in 1952), Chatto & Windus, 2002. Pimlico. ISBN 978-0712668422. 2nd ed., 2014, Princeton University Press. ISBN 978-0691114996.
- Liberty [revised and expanded edition of Four Essays on Liberty], Oxford University Press, 2002. ISBN 978-0199249893.
- The Soviet Mind: Russian Culture under Communism, Brookings Institution Press, 2004. ISBN 978-0815721550. 2nd ed., Brookings Classics, 2016. ISBN 978-0815728870.
- +Political Ideas in the Romantic Age: Their Rise and Influence on Modern Thought (1952), Chatto & Windus, 2006. ISBN 0701179090. Pimlico, ISBN 978-1844139262. 2nd ed., 2014, Princeton University Press. ISBN 978-0691126951.
- (with Beata Polanowska-Sygulska) Unfinished Dialogue, Prometheus, 2006. ISBN 978-1591023760.

=== Letters ===
- Flourishing: Letters 1928–1946 (edited by Henry Hardy), Chatto & Windus, 2004. ISBN 978-0-701174200. Pimlico, ISBN 978-0712635653.
- Enlightening: Letters 1946–1960 (edited by Henry Hardy and Jennifer Holmes), Chatto & Windus, 2009. ISBN 978-0701178895. Pimlico, ISBN 978-1844138340.
- Building: Letters 1960–1975 (edited by Henry Hardy and Mark Pottle), Chatto & Windus, 2013. ISBN 978-0701185763.
- Affirming: Letters 1975–1997 (edited by Henry Hardy and Mark Pottle), Chatto & Windus, 2015. ISBN 978-1784740085.

== Sources ==
- Ignatieff, Michael (1998). Isaiah Berlin: A Life. New York: Metropolitan. ISBN 0805063005. OCLC 42666274. Authorised biography.

Academic offices
Preceded by G. D. H. Cole	Chichele Professor of Social and Political Theory; 1957–1967	Succeeded by John Plamenatz
New office	President of Wolfson College, Oxford; 1965–1975	Succeeded by Sir Henry Fisher
Professional and academic associations
Preceded by H. D. Lewis	President of the Aristotelian Society; 1963–1964	Succeeded by W. H. Walsh
Preceded by Sir Denys Page	President of the British Academy; 1974–1978	Succeeded by Sir Kenneth Dover
Awards
Preceded by Octavio Paz	Jerusalem Prize; 1979	Succeeded by Graham Greene
