= Laurence Marks (journalist) =

Laurence Marks (26 January 1928 – 25 May 1996) was a British journalist who wrote for many years for The Observer and previously for The Sunday Times.

Marks read law at Lincoln College, Oxford, and began his career on The Oxford Mail. He moved on to the Evening Standard (where he edited 'Londoner's Diary') and then The Sunday Times. He left The Sunday Times after the paper was accused of being in contempt of court in December 1967 over a caption for a photograph of Michael X. Marks, who had written the caption, resigned in protest at what he regarded as a failure of support by the paper and in particular the editor Harold Evans. Marks joined The Observer and stayed for over 25 years before contributing to The Independent on Sunday in his final years.
