= Henry Hardy =

British academic, author and editor (born 1949)

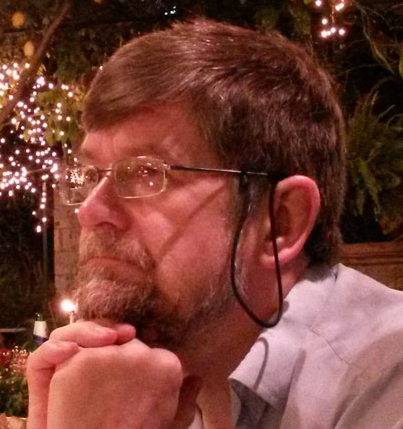
- Hardy in Sorrento, October 2014
- Born: 15 March 1949 (age 77); London, England

Academic background
- Education: Corpus Christi College, Oxford; Wolfson College, Oxford
- Website: Official website

Henry Robert Dugdale Hardy (born 15 March 1949) is a British academic, author and editor, known for his work on Isaiah Berlin and Maurice Bowra

== Career ==
Hardy was born in London in 1949 and educated at Lancing College, where his contemporaries included Christopher Hampton and Tim Rice. He went on to study classics, and then philosophy and psychology, at Corpus Christi College, Oxford, and philosophy at Wolfson College, Oxford, where he wrote a BPhil thesis in the philosophy of mind entitled 'Subjective Experiences', later expanded into a doctoral thesis entitled 'Subjective Experience'. It was at Wolfson that Hardy met Wolfson's then President, Isaiah Berlin.

Hardy's first edited volume was a collection of writings by Arnold Mallinson, an eccentric Oxford clergyman with whom he lodged for seven years. He published this work under his own imprint (Robert Dugdale). While still a student, Hardy also composed a number of musical pieces, which he published many years later as Tunes: Collected Musical Juvenilia (2003).

In addition to publishing under the pseudonym Robert Dugdale from 1974 to 2005, Hardy worked for thirteen years (1977–90) as an editor at Oxford University Press, first editing and commissioning in the General Books Department, then commissioning academic books as Senior Editor, Political and Social Studies. At OUP in 1980, inspired by Isaiah Berlin's insistence on the crucial role of individual thinkers in the history of ideas, he founded the Past Masters series (now absorbed into the Very Short Introductions series). His wish to publish a work of popular philosophy, Making Names, by Andrew Malcolm, was not endorsed by OUP. This was the subject of Malcolm's landmark legal action against OUP for breach of contract. Hardy's account of this episode is told in his review of Malcolm's book about the case. Hardy has been a Fellow of Wolfson College since 1990 (an Honorary Fellow since 2015).

At Wolfson he met Bryan Magee, came to know him well, and became his executor. When Magee died in 2019, he organised a celebration of his life at Keble College, Oxford (where Magee was an undergraduate), which was recorded on film. A shortened version of the film may be viewed online.

== Isaiah Berlin ==
Isaiah Berlin, though a towering intellectual figure at the time of his death, was at one stage not regarded as having published very extensively. Hardy's research revealed that Berlin had published well over 150 pieces by the late 1970s. By 2023 Hardy's online list of Berlin's publications had grown to almost 500 items.

Hardy's editing of Berlin's essays made Berlin's most important work widely available. In 1990 Hardy abandoned his career in publishing to work full-time on Berlin's unpublished essays, lectures, and correspondence. He has (co-)edited eighteen volumes of Berlin's writings (plus new editions of thirteen of these volumes), as well as a four-volume edition of Berlin's letters, and two books and a pamphlet about Berlin. In 2018 he published a memoir of his work with and on Berlin. Reviewing the book for 'Best Books of 2018' in the Guardian, John Banville wrote: 'Henry Hardy has self-effacingly devoted the larger part of his professional career to the editing, promoting and celebrating of the work of Isaiah Berlin. In Search of Isaiah Berlin: A Literary Adventure (I.B.Tauris) looks back over his long labours of love with fondness, a fine dry wit and a light salting of justified irritation at those entrusted with Berlin’s posthumous affairs. The second part consists of Hardy’s own philosophical response to Berlin’s theories on matters such as plurality, religious belief and our shared human nature. A wonderful book on a wonderful subject.'

In June 2015 Hardy delivered the 7th Isaiah Berlin Memorial Lecture in Riga. Opening remarks were made by Ivars Ijabs, chair of the Board of the Foundation for an Open Society.

== Maurice Bowra ==
Maurice Bowra was an English Classicist who was Warden of Wadham College, Oxford from 1938 to 1970. Known for his wit, he was also known for his 'notoriously scabrous satirical poems on his contemporaries', described as 'unprintable' by John Sparrow, his friend from All Souls. 'And unprinted [they have] largely remained, though Bowra did give occasional after-dinner readings to carefully chosen friends.'

This situation changed when Henry Hardy found a cache of Bowra's poems as he was working through the papers of Isaiah Berlin. These had been saved by Berlin for a project started with John Sparrow to explain the many allusions the poems contain. Hardy, working with Jennifer Holmes, set about completing this project, adding poems from other sources, including Wadham College's Bowra papers. The result was New Bats in Old Belfries, published in 2005, 34 years after Bowra's death in 1971. Bowra's title duplicates that of one of John Betjeman’s collections of poems (1945). (Betjeman was one of the contemporaries satirised by Bowra in his poems.)

Hardy was unable to include all of Bowra’s poems in 2005: two, written in 1950, remained unprintable: 'This was because their subject was still alive, and was unwilling to give his approval for their inclusion in his lifetime.' The subject in question was the travel writer Patrick Leigh Fermor, and he remained adamant. Hardy relates how James Morwood (Emeritus Fellow of Wadham, and editor of the Wadham Gazette) 'visited him later in his Greek home to ask about his friendship with Bowra (on behalf of Leslie Mitchell, Bowra’s biographer), he found that the hurt of reading the poems was still smarting.'

Fermor died in June 2011, and Hardy and Morwood published the two offending poems in the Wadham Gazette in December that year. The two poems were The Wounded Gigolo and On the Coast of Terra Fermoor.

== Family and personal life ==
In 1979 Hardy married the historian of medicine Anne Wilkinson. They separated in 2004, and divorced in 2012. They have two children, Ellen (b. 1983) and Michael (b. 1985). Hardy married Mary Merry in 2013, and now lives with her in Wirral.

Hardy is a nephew of the actor Robert Hardy (who was also his godfather) and a brother of the composer John Hardy.

On 16 March 2021, Hardy suffered a cardiac arrest, which would probably have killed him had he not been taken to hospital shortly beforehand after a series of blackouts.
