= Forsyth (surname) =

Forsyth is a Scottish surname. It may refer to:

== A ==
- Adam Forsyth (born 1981), Australian Olympic boxer
- Alastair Forsyth (born 1976), Scottish professional golfer
- Alex Forsyth (disambiguation), multiple people
- Ali Forsyth (born 1979), New Zealand international lawn and indoor bowler
- Allan Forsyth (born 1955), Scottish footballer
- Allison Forsyth (born 1978), Canadian alpine skier
- Amanda Forsyth (born 1966), Canadian cellist
- Andrew Forsyth (1858–1942), British mathematician
- Andy Forsyth (born 1990), English rugby-union player
- Archibald Forsyth (1826–1908), Scottish-born Australian politician

== B ==
- Benjamin Forsyth (died 1814), U.S. Army officer in the War of 1812
- Bill Forsyth (diplomat) (1909–1993), Australian diplomat
- Bill Forsyth (born 1946), Scottish film director
- Brandon Forsyth (born 1979), American figure skater
- Brigit Forsyth (1940–2023), Scottish actress
- Bruce Forsyth (1928–2017), British entertainer

== C ==
- C. E. Forsyth (1849–1933), American politician
- Campbell Forsyth (1934–2020), Kilmarnock and Scotland international goalkeeper
- Cecil Forsyth (1870–1941), British composer
- Charles Forsyth (1885–1951), British water polo player
- Colin Forsyth, English professional rugby league footballer
- Craig Forsyth (born 1989), Scottish footballer

== D ==
- Darren Forsyth (born 1988), Irish footballer
- David Forsyth (disambiguation), multiple people
- Donald W. Forsyth (born 1948), American geophysicist and seismologist

== E ==
- Ed Forsyth (1887–1956), Major League Baseball third baseman

== F ==
- Francis Forsyth (1942–1960), British criminal who was executed
- Frederick Forsyth (1938–2025), British writer and journalist

== G ==
- Gavin Forsyth (born 1969), British alpine skier
- George Forsyth (disambiguation), multiple people
- Gordon Forsyth (1879–1952), Scottish ceramic designer, fine artist, art education innovator
- Guy Forsyth (born 1968), American Texas blues and blues rock singer, guitarist, harmonicist and songwriter

== H ==
- H. A. Forsyth, known as Bert Forsyth, Australian film producer
- Harry Forsyth (1903–2004), Irish cricketer
- Heather Forsyth (born 1950), Canadian politician
- Holly Forsyth (born 1971), American writer and storyboard artist

== I ==
- Iain Forsyth (born 1973), British artist and filmmaker
- Ian Forsyth (born 1946), Scottish rugby union player

== J ==
- Jack Forsyth (1892–1966), American football coach
- James Forsyth (disambiguation), multiple people
- Jim Forsyth (born 1944), Australian rules footballer
- Jimmy Forsyth (1904–1982), Scottish football player, trainer and physiotherapist
- Jimmy Forsyth (photographer), (1913–2009), British amateur photographer
- John Forsyth (disambiguation), multiple people
- Joseph Forsyth (1763–1815), Scottish writer on Italy
- Julie Forsyth, Australian actress

== K ==
- Kate Forsyth (born 1966), Australian writer
- Katherine Forsyth, Scottish historian
- Keeley Forsyth (born 1979), English actress and musician
- Keith Forsyth (1917–2006), Australian rules footballer
- Kimberly Forsyth, American beauty queen, winner of the 2006 "Miss Arkansas USA" competition

== M ==
- Malcolm Forsyth (1936–2011), South African and Canadian trombonist and composer
- Mark Forsyth (born 1977), British writer and etymologist
- Matt Forsyth, Scottish professional football defender
- Michael Forsyth, Baron Forsyth of Drumlean (born 1954), British politician
- Michael Forsyth (footballer) (born 1966), English footballer
- Mina Forsyth (1921–1987), Canadian artist
- Moira Forsyth (1905–1991), English stained glass artist
- Murray Forsyth (born 1936), British political scientist

== N ==
- Neil Forsyth (born 1978), Scottish author, television writer and journalist

== O ==
- Olivia Forsyth (born 1960), former spy for the apartheid government in South Africa

== P ==
- Peter Taylor Forsyth (1848–1921), Scottish theologian
- Phillip Forsyth, Canadian newspaper and radio journalist

== R ==
- Richard Forsyth (born 1970), English footballer
- Robert Forsyth (bishop), contemporary Australian Anglican Bishop of South Sydney
- Robert Forsyth (writer) (1766–1845), Scottish writer, wrote The Beauties of Scotland
- Rosemary Forsyth (born 1943), Canadian-born American actress and model
- Ross Forsyth (born 1982), Scottish footballer

== S ==
- Samuel Forsyth (1891–1918), New Zealand soldier
- Samuel Forsyth (Methodist) (1881–1960), Australian Methodist pastor and social worker
- Stewart Forsyth (born 1961), Scottish footballer

== T ==
- Thomas Forsyth (disambiguation), multiple people
- Tim Forsyth (born 1973), Australian athlete
- Tony Forsyth, English actor

== W ==
- Wesley Octavius Forsyth (1859–1937), Canadian pianist and composer
- William Forsyth (disambiguation), multiple people

== See also ==
- Clan Forsyth
- Forsythe (surname)
