= Enlightenment philosophy =

Philosophy during the Age of Enlightenment

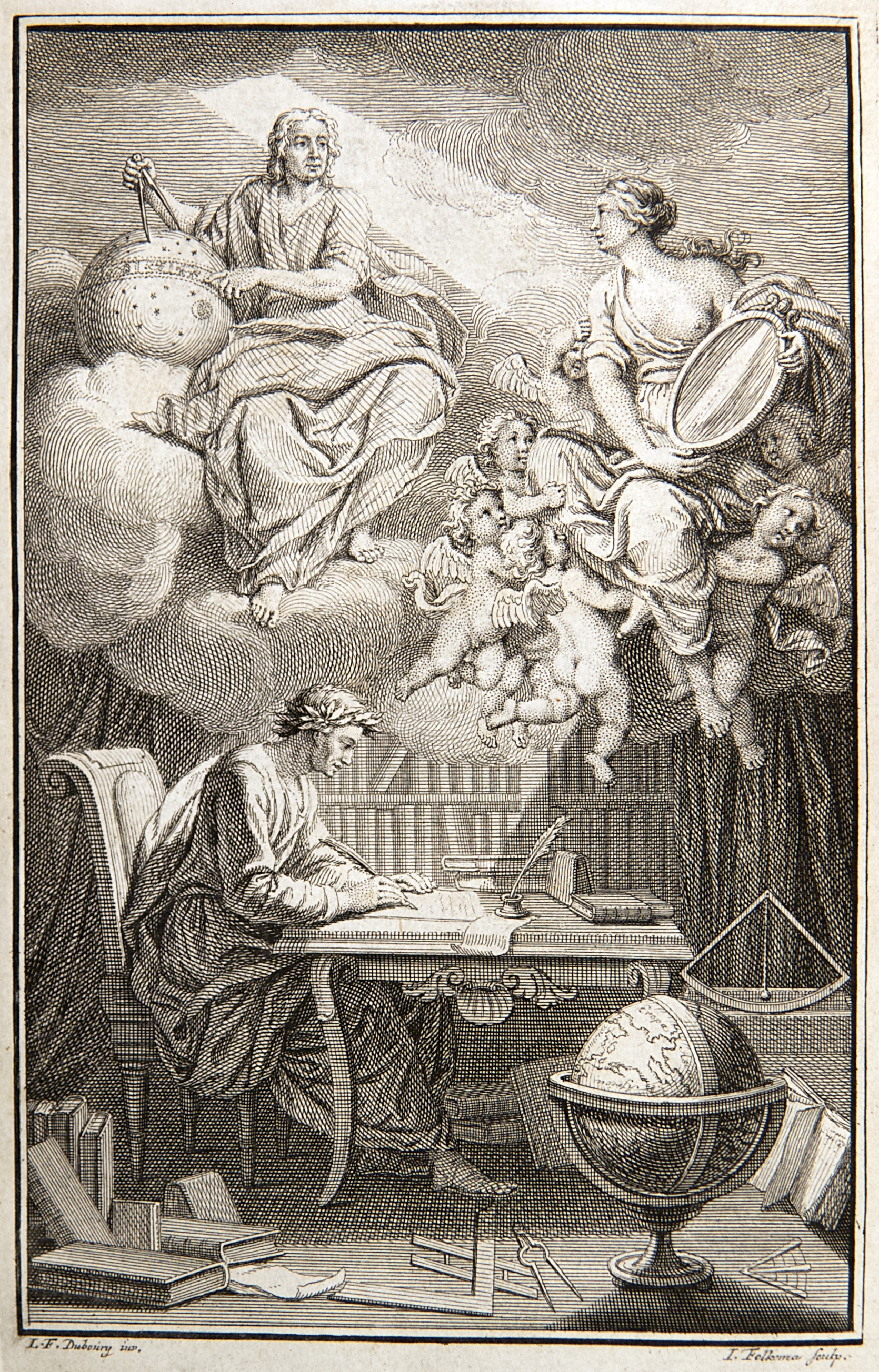
Cover engraving of Voltaire's book on the works of Isaac Newton, Éléments de la philosophie de Newton ("Elements of Newtonian Philosophy") of 1738. The sitter, translating Newton's works, is "enlightened" by a quasi-divine light emanating from Newton himself. The light is reflected by a mirror held by a muse representing Émilie du Châtelet, Voltaire's mistress and co-translator.

Enlightenment philosophy (Note: Also known as the philosophy of the Enlightenment. In other European languages: Dutch: Verlichtingsfilosofie; French: philosophie des Lumières, lit. 'philosophy of the Lights' (i.e. "the lights of reason"); German: Aufklärungsphilosophie or Philosophie der Aufklärung; Italian: filosofia dell'Illuminismo; Polish: filozofia Oświecenia; Portuguese: filosofia do Iluminismo; Russian: философия Просвещения; Spanish: filosofía de la Ilustración; Swedish: Upplysningsfilosofi) was the philosophy produced during the Age of Enlightenment (late 17th and 18th centuries), originating in France, then western Europe and spreading throughout the rest of Europe. The Enlightenment philosophers included (among others) Baruch Spinoza, David Hume, John Locke, Edward Gibbon, Voltaire, Jean-Jacques Rousseau, Denis Diderot, Pierre Bayle, and Isaac Newton. Enlightenment philosophy was influenced by the Scientific Revolution in southern Europe, arising directly from the Italian Renaissance with people like Galileo Galilei.

Many Enlightenment philosophers viewed themselves as part of a progressive intellectual élite and opposed religious and political persecution, criticizing what they regarded as irrationality, arbitrariness, obscurantism, and superstition in earlier periods. They redefined the study of knowledge to fit the ethics and aesthetics of their time. Their works had great influence at the end of the 18th century, in the American Declaration of Independence and the Declaration of Rights of Man and Citizen.

Enlightenment philosophy saw its climax in the middle of the 18th century. In the most general terms, in science and philosophy, the Enlightenment aimed for the triumph of reason over faith and belief; in politics and economics, the increasing political influence of the bourgeoisie relative to the nobility and clergy.

Enlightenment philosophers had disrupted the old certainties, which resulted in social and political upheaval. The Enlightenment inspired a revolutionary generation, leading to the American Revolution and French Revolution.

== Scientific Revolution ==
=== Advances in scientific method ===
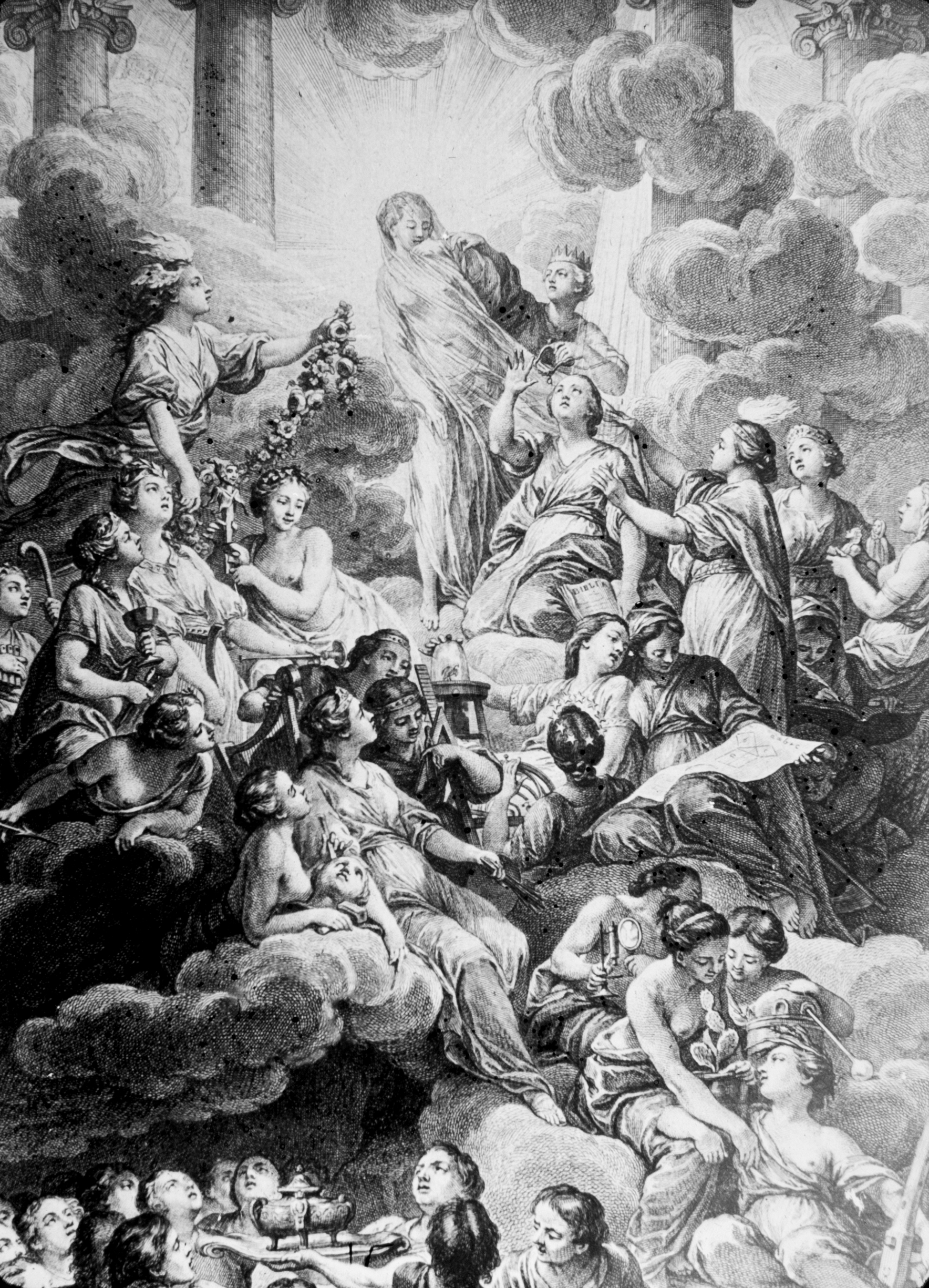
Detail from the frontispiece of Diderot and D'Alembert's Encyclopédie. Truth radiates light; on the right, Reason and Philosophy try to capture it. 1772 engraving by Benoît-Louis Prévost, from a drawing by Charles Nicolas Cochin.

The Enlightenment was in large part an extension of the discoveries of Nicolas Copernicus in the 16th century, which were not well known during his lifetime, and more so of the theories of Galileo Galilei (1564–1642). Inquiries to establish certain axioms and mathematical proofs continued as Cartesianism throughout the 17th century.

Gottfried Wilhelm von Leibniz (1646–1716) and Isaac Newton (1642–1727) had independently and almost simultaneously developed the calculus, and René Descartes (1596–1650) the idea of monads. British philosophers such as Thomas Hobbes and David Hume adopted an approach, later called empiricism, which preferred the use of the senses and experience over that of pure reason.

Baruch Spinoza took Descartes's side, most of all in his Ethics. But he demurred from Descartes in Tractatus de Intellectus Emendatione ("On the Improvement of the Understanding"), where he argued that the process of perception is not one of pure reason, but also the senses and intuition. Spinoza's thought was based on a model of the universe where God and Nature are one and the same.

This became an anchor in the Age of Enlightenment, held across the ages from Newton's time to that of Thomas Jefferson's (1743–1826). A notable change was the emergence of a naturalist philosophy, spreading across Europe, embodied by Newton. The scientific method – exploring experimental evidence and constructing consistent theories and axiom systems from observed phenomena – was undeniably useful.

The predictive success of Newton’s theories culminated in his masterwork Philosophiae Naturalis Principia Mathematica (1687). As an example of scientific progress in the Age of Reason and the Enlightenment, Newton's example remains unsurpassed, in taking observed facts and constructing a theory which explains them a priori, for example taking the motions of the planets observed by Johannes Kepler to confirm his law of universal gravitation. Naturalism saw the unification of pure empiricism as practiced by the likes of Francis Bacon with the axiomatic, "pure reason" approach of Descartes.

Belief in an intelligible world ordered by a Christian God became the crux of philosophical investigations of knowledge. On one side, religious philosophy concentrated on piety, and the omniscience and ultimately mysterious nature of God; on the other were ideas such as deism, underpinned by the impression that the world was comprehensible by human reason and that it was governed by universal physical laws. God was imagined as a "Great Watchmaker"; experimental natural philosophers found the world to be more and more ordered, even as machines and measuring instruments became ever more sophisticated and precise.

The most famous French natural philosopher of the 18th century, Georges-Louis Leclerc de Buffon, was critical of this natural theology in his masterwork Histoire Naturelle. Buffon rejected the idea of ascribing to divine intervention and the "supernatural" that which science could now explain. This criticism brought him up against the Sorbonne which, dominated by the Roman Catholic Church, never stopped trying to censor him. In 1751, he was ordered to redact some propositions contrary to the teaching of the Church; having proposed 74,000 years for the age of the Earth, this was contrary to the Bible which, using the scientific method on data found in biblical concordances, which conflicted with contemporary biblical chronologies. The Church was also hostile to his no less illustrious contemporary Carl von Linné, and some have concluded that the Church simply refused to believe that order existed in nature.

=== Encyclopaedic goals ===
At the time, there was a particular taste for compendia of "all knowledge". This ideal found an instance in Diderot and d'Alembert's Encyclopédie, ou dictionnaire raisonné des sciences, des arts et des métiers ("Encyclopaedia, or Systematic Dictionary of the Sciences, Arts, and Crafts"), usually known simply as the Encyclopédie. Published between 1750 and 1770 it aimed to lead people out of ignorance through the widest dissemination of knowledge.

== Philosophical themes ==
=== Individual liberty and the social contract ===
This effort to research and elucidate universal laws, and to determine their component parts, also became an important element in the construction of a philosophy of individualism, where everyone had rights based only on fundamental human rights. There developed the philosophical notion of the thoughtful subject, an individual who could make decisions based on pure reason and no longer in the yoke of custom. In Two Treatises of Government, John Locke argued that property rights are not held in common but are totally personal, and made legitimate by the work required to obtain the property, as well as its protection (recognition) by others. Once the idea of natural law is accepted, it becomes possible to form the modern view of what we would now call political economy.

In his famous essay Answering the Question: What is Enlightenment? (German: Beantwortung der Frage: Was ist Aufklärung?), Immanuel Kant defined enlightenment thus:

Aufklärung ist der Ausgang des Menschen aus seiner selbst verschuldeten Unmündigkeit. Unmündigkeit ist das Unvermögen, sich seines Verstandes ohne Leitung eines anderen zu bedienen. Selbstverschuldet ist diese Unmündigkeit, wenn die Ursache derselben nicht am Mangel des Verstandes, sondern der Entschließung und des Mutes liegt, sich seiner ohne Leitung eines anderen zu bedienen. Sapere aude! Habe Mut, dich deines eigenen Verstandes zu bedienen!' ist also der Wahlspruch der Aufklärung. Enlightenment is the release of man from a state of bondage for which he is himself responsible. In this state of bondage he is unable to fulfill his intentions without the help of another. He is himself responsible for this bondage, where the cause is not a lack of understanding but a lack of resolution and courage to use it unguided. Sapere aude! Have the courage to use your own understanding! Such is the motto of the enlightenment.

Enlightenment philosophy was thus based on the realities of a systematic, ordered and understandable world, which required Man also to think in an ordered and systematic way. As well as physical laws, this included ideas on the laws governing human affairs and the divine right of kings, leading to the idea that the monarch acts with the consent of the people, and not the other way around. This legal concept informed Jean-Jacques Rousseau's theory of the social contract as a reciprocal relationship between men, and more so between families and other groups, which would become increasingly stronger, accompanied by a concept of individual inalienable rights. Among atheist Enlightenment thinkers, appeals to divine authority were rejected in favor of secular reasoning.

The Enlightenment redefined the ideas of liberty, property and rationalism, which took on meanings that we still understand today, and introduced into political philosophy the idea of the free individual, liberty for all guaranteed by the State (and not the whim of the government) backed by a strong rule of law.

To understand the interaction between the Age of Enlightenment and the Enlighteners, one approach is to compare Thomas Hobbes with John Locke. Hobbes (1588–1679) worked to create an ontology of human emotions, ultimately trying to make order out of an inherently chaotic universe. Meanwhile, Locke (1632–1704) saw in nature a source of unity and universal rights, with the government's assurance of protection. This intellectual shift during the 17th and 18th centuries reflected contrasting views of the relationship between humanity and nature.

In France, this resulted in the spread of the notion of human rights, finding expression in the 1789 Declaration of the Rights of Man and of the Citizen, which greatly influenced similar declarations of rights in the following centuries, and left in its wake global political upheaval. Especially in France and the United States, freedom of expression, freedom of religion and freedom of thought were held to be fundamental rights.

=== Social values and manifests ===
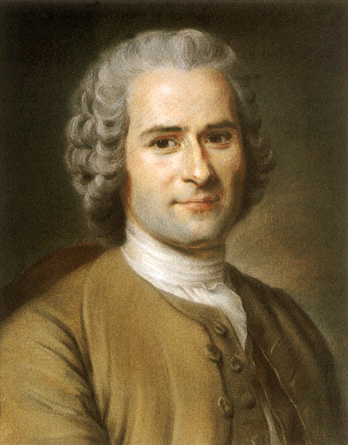
Jean-Jacques Rousseau

==== Representation of the people ====
The core values supported by the Enlighteners were religious tolerance, liberty and social equality. In England, America and France, the application of these values resulted in a new definition of natural law and a separation of political power. To these values may be added a love of nature and the cult of reason.

Aujourd'hui nous recevons trois éducations différentes ou contraires : celles de nos pères, celles de nos maîtres, celle du monde. Ce qu'on nous dit dans la dernière renverse toutes les idées des premières.
Today we receive three different, conflicting, educations: those of our fathers, those of our masters, and those of the world. It is only when we know the last that we can reject the first two.

— Montesquieu

==== Philosophical goals ====
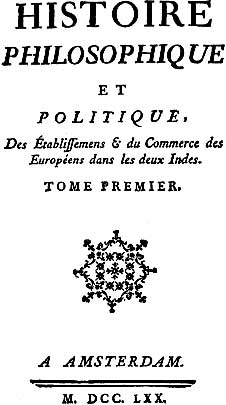
Cover of Raynal's Histoire des deux Indes, an encyclopaedia of 18th-century anticolonialism

The ideal figure of the Enlightenment was a philosopher, a man of letters with a social function of exercising his reason in all domains to guide his and others' conscience, to advocate a value system and use it in discussing the problems of the time. He is a committed individual, involved in society, an honnête homme qui agit en tout par raison (Encyclopédie; "Honest man who approaches everything with reason"), qui s'occupe à démasquer des erreurs (Diderot, "Who concerns himself with revealing error").

The rationalism of the Enlightenment was not to the exclusion of aesthetics. Reason and sentiment went hand-in-hand in their philosophy. The thoughts of Enlightenment philosophers were equally capable of intellectual rigour and sentimentality.

Despite controversy about the limits of their philosophy, especially when they denounced black slavery, many Enlightenment philosophers criticised slavery, or colonialism, or both, including Montesquieu in De l'Esprit des Lois (while keeping a "personal" slave), Denis Diderot in Supplément au voyage de Bougainville, Voltaire in Candide and Guillaume-Thomas Raynal in his encyclopaedic Histoire des deux Indes, the very model of 18th-century anticolonialism to which, among others, Diderot and d'Holbach contributed. It was stated without any proof that one of their number, Voltaire, had shares in the slave trade.

== Criticism ==
The Enlightenment was, for all its existence, pulled in two directions by opposing social forces: on one side, a strong spiritualism accompanied by a traditional faith in the religion of the Church; on the other, the rise of an anticlerical movement, critical of the differences between religious theory and practice, which was most manifest in France.

Anticlericism was not the only source of tension in France: some noblemen contested monarchical power and the upper classes wanted to see greater fruit from their labours. A relaxing of morals fomented opinion against absolutism and the Ancient Order. The French judicial system also showed itself to be outdated. Even though commercial law had become codified during the 17th century, there was no uniform, or codified, civil law.

According to Dale K. Van Kley, Jansenism in France also became a source of division.

=== Voltaire ===
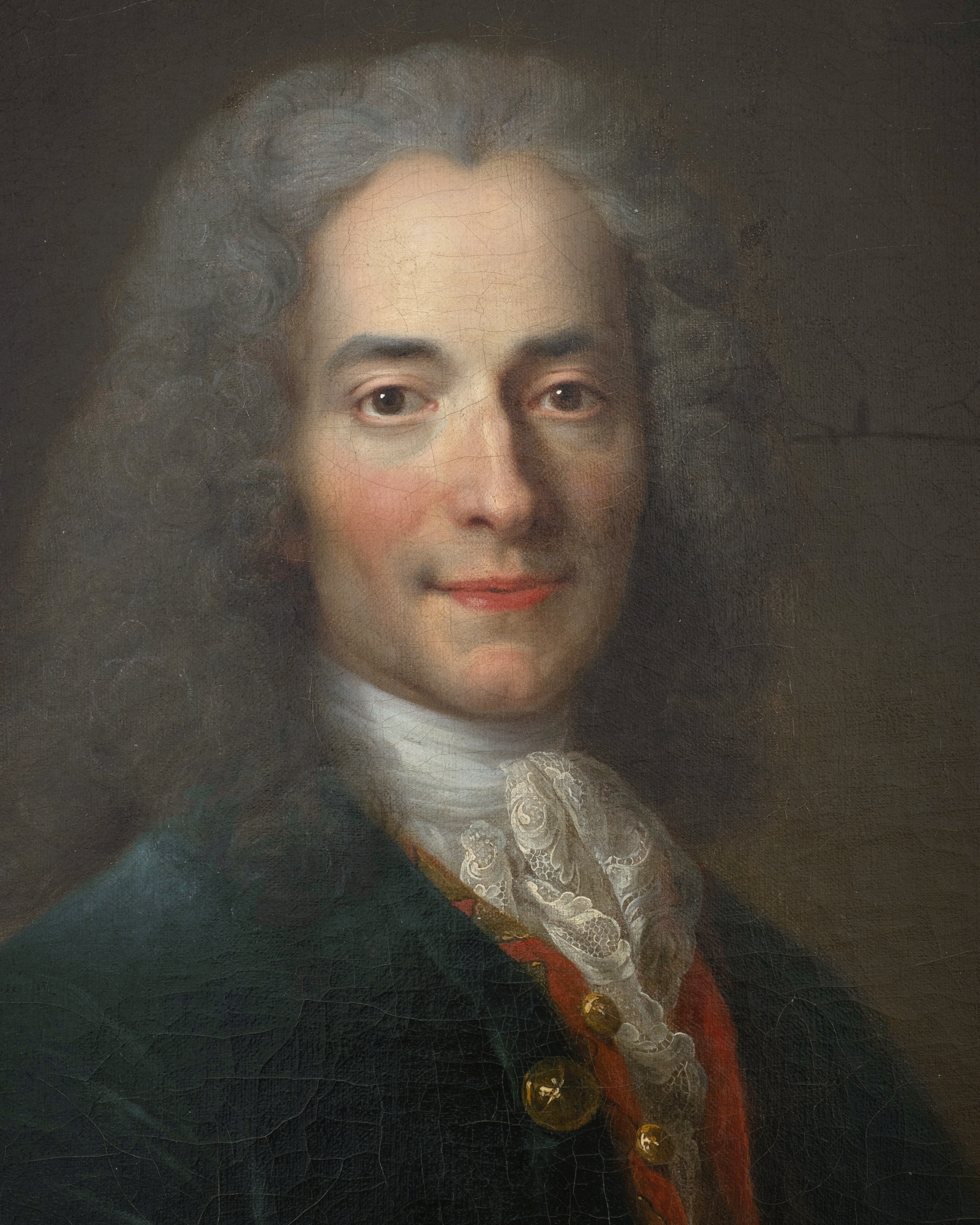
Voltaire (c. 1745) by the school of Nicolas de Largillière

This social and legal background was criticised in works by the likes of Voltaire. Exiled in England between 1726 and 1729, he studied the works of John Locke and Isaac Newton, and the English monarchy. He became well known for his denunciation of injustices such as those against Jean Calas, Pierre-Paul Sirven, François-Jean de la Barre and Thomas Arthur, comte de Lally.

For Voltaire, it was obvious that if the monarch can get the people to believe unreasonable things, then he can get them to do unreasonable things. This axiom became the basis for his criticism of Enlightenment philosophers, and led to the basis of romanticism: that constructions from pure reason created as many problems as they solved.

According to Enlightenment philosophers, the crucial point of intellectual progress consisted of the synthesis of knowledge, enlightened by human reason, with the creation of a sovereign moral authority. A contrary point of view that developed, arguing that such a process would be swayed by social conventions, leading to a "New Truth" based on reason that was but a poor imitation of the ideal and unassailable truth.

The Enlightenment thus tried to find a balance between the idea of a "natural" liberty (or autonomy) and the freedom from that liberty, that is to say, the recognition that the autonomy found in nature was at odds with the discipline required for pure reason. At the same time, with various monarchs' reforms, there was a piecemeal attempt to redefine the order of society, and the relationship between monarch and subjects. The idea of a natural order was equally prevalent in scientific thought, for example, in the works of the biologist Carl von Linné.

=== Kant ===
In Germany, Immanuel Kant (like Rousseau, defining himself among Enlightenment philosophers) heavily criticised the limitations of pure reason in his work Critique of Pure Reason (German: Kritik der reinen Vernunft), but also that of English empiricism in Critique of Practical Reason (German: Kritik der praktischen Vernunft). Compared with the rather subjective metaphysics of Descartes, Kant developed a more objective viewpoint in this branch of philosophy.

=== Adam Smith ===
Great thinkers at the end of the Enlightenment (Adam Smith, Thomas Jefferson and even the young Goethe) adopted into their philosophy the ideas of self-organising and evolutionary forces. The Enlightenment stance was then presented with reference to what was seen as a universal truth: that Good is fundamental in nature, but it is not self-evident. On the contrary, it is the advance of human reason that reveals this constant structure. Romanticism is the exact opposite of this stance.

== Aestheticism ==
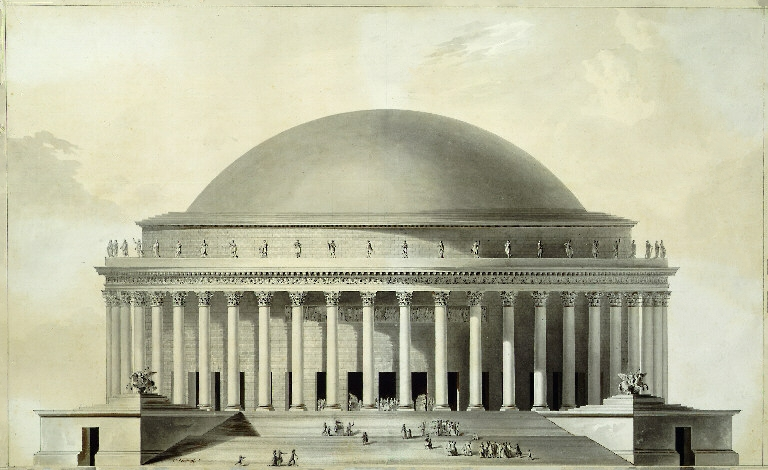
Redevelopment of the Opéra de Paris by Étienne-Louis Boullée, 1781

D'une façon générale, la sensibilité des Lumières porte à une sentimentalité morale : le temps de l'ironie voltairienne passé, on veut s'apitoyer, avec Rousseau (la Nouvelle Héloïse, 1761) et les tableaux de Greuze, chercher le beau et le bon éternels. Plus le siècle s'avance, plus la littérature et l'art répudient la gratuité des formes, la légèreté, regardées comme aristocratiques et mondaines, pour aller vers le sérieux, l'authentique et le naturel, c'est-à-dire vers ce qui est conforme à la morale utilitaire du public bourgeois d'où le goût croissant pour le néoclassicisme, qui met en avant l'antique, non pas l'antique allégorique de l'époque classique mais un antique historique plus sobre, à la façon du peintre David

— Michel Le Moël and Sophie Descat, L'Urbanisme parisien au siècle des Lumières

In its general view, the aestheticism of Enlightenment philosophers took on a moral aspect, the times of Voltaire's satire had passed, and Rousseau (in Julie, or the New Heloise of 1776) and the paintings of Jean-Baptiste Greuze sought the beautiful and the everlasting. As the century grew older, more literature and art turned its back on free forms and a lightness of touch, regarding them as aristocratic and worldly. They turned towards the serious, the authentic and the natural, that fit the utilitarian morality of the bourgeois public whose taste was for neoclassicism: still having antiquity as subject-matter, but not the allegorical antiquity; a more realistic, sober antiquity, such as in the works of the painter Jacques-Louis David.

This resulted in reflections about urbanism. The Enlightenment model town would be a joint effort between public provision and sympathetic architects, to create administrative or utilitarian buildings (town halls, hospitals, theatres, commissariats) all provided with views, squares, fountains, promenades, and so on. The French Académie royale d'architecture was of the opinion that le beau est ce qui plait ("The beautiful is the pleasant"). For Abbé Laugier, on the contrary, the beautiful was that which was in line with rationality. The natural model for all architecture was the log cabin supported by four tree trunks, with four horizontal parts and a roof, respectively columns, entablature, and pediments. The model of a Greek temple was thus extended into the décor and the structure. This paradigm resulted in a change of style in the middle of the 18th century: Rococo was dismissed, Ancient Greece and Palladian architecture became the principal references for neoclassical architecture.

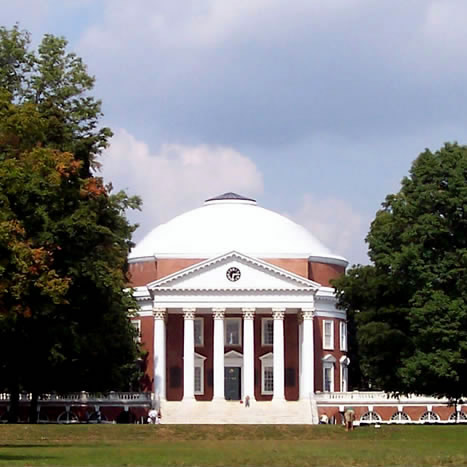
The rotunda of the University of Virginia, designed by Thomas Jefferson.

The University of Virginia, a UNESCO World Heritage Site, was founded by Thomas Jefferson. He drew up plans for parts of the campus based on the values of Enlightenment philosophers.

The Place Stanislas at Nancy, France is the focus of an array of neoclassical urban buildings, and has been on the UNESCO List of World Heritage Sites in France since 1983, as well as several other sites in the town, such as the Place de la Carrière and the Place d'Alliance, the administrative centre of the time.

Claude Nicolas Ledoux (1736–1806) was a member of the Académie d'Architecture was without doubt the architect whose projects best represented the utopian, purely rational environment. (That which is rational, and thus based in the understanding of nature, cannot be at the same time utopian.) Starting in 1775 he built the Royal Saltworks at Arc-et-Senans, a very industrial city in Doubs.

The bourgeoise had learned nothing from Enlightenment philosophers, even though they saw Rousseau, Montesquieu and Kant as honest men who approved of the "élite": a vague concept, and one of which Enlightenment philosophers amongst others disapproved.de La Boétie, Étienn. Le Discours sur la Servitude Volontaire.

There was considerable coverage in the English and French Press, but less so in Germany and Italy; in Spain and Russia very few knew about it save a few intellectuals, senior officials and grand families participated in the movement. The mass of the people could not care less: the vast majority of the common people, even in France, had never heard of Voltaire or Rousseau.

== Key figures ==
=== Philosophers ===
==== Origins ====
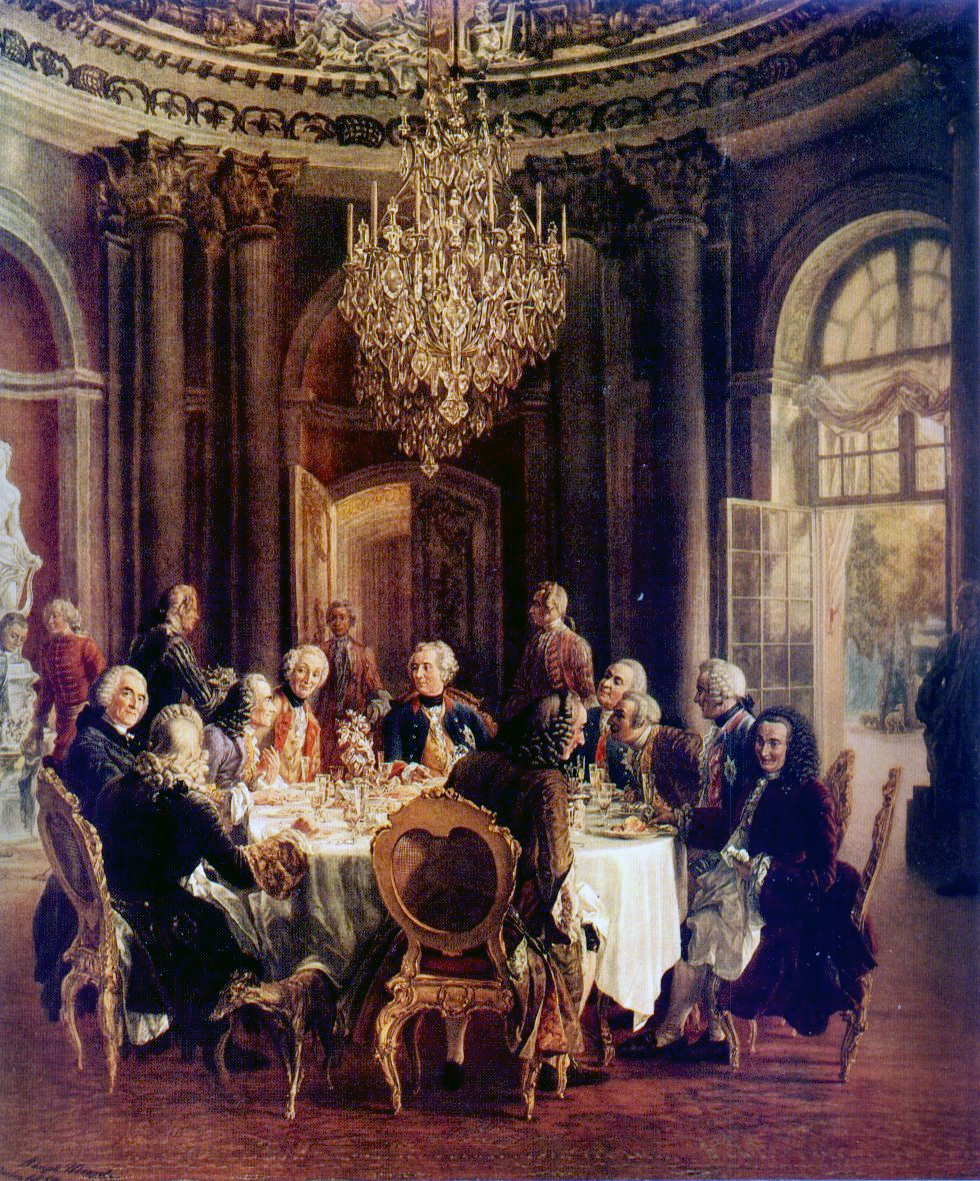
German: Tafelrunde ("Round Table") at the Court of Frederick II [the Great] of Prussia (1850) by Adolph von Menzel. Voltaire is depicted on the left.

The philosophers of the Enlightenment came with many different talents: Thomas Jefferson had had a legal education but was equally at home with archaeology and architecture; Benjamin Franklin had been a career diplomat and was a physicist. Condorcet wrote on subjects as wide-ranging as commerce, finance, education and science.

The social origins of the philosophers were also diverse: many were from middle-class families (Voltaire, Jefferson), others from more modest beginnings (Immanuel Kant, Franklin, Diderot) or from the nobility (Montesquieu, Condorcet). Some had had a religious education (Diderot, Louis de Jaucourt) or one in the law (Montesquieu, Jefferson).

The 18th century philosophers formed networks and communicated in letters often meeting to debate in salons, cafés or academies. Prominent correspondence between Rousseau and Voltaire is well known. These thinkers and savants formed an international community. Franklin, Jefferson, Adam Smith, David Hume and Ferdinando Galiani all spent many years in France.

Because they criticised the established order, the philosophers were chased by the authorities and had to resort to subterfuge to escape prison. François-Marie Arouet took on the pseudonym Voltaire. In 1774, Thomas Jefferson wrote a report on behalf of the Virginia delegates to the First Continental Congress, which was convened to discuss the grievances of Great Britain's American colonies. Because its content, he could only publish it anonymously. Diderot's Lettre sur les aveugles à l'usage de ceux qui voient ("Letter on the Blind for the Use of those who can See") landed him in prison at the Château de Vincennes. Voltaire was accused of writing pamphlets criticising Philippe II, Duke of Orléans (1674–1723), and imprisoned in the Bastille. in 1721, Montesquieu published Lettres persanes ("Persian Letters") anonymously in Holland. From 1728 to 1734, he went to many European countries.

Faced with censorship and in financial difficulty, the philosophers often resorted to the protection of aristocrats and patrons: Chrétien Guillaume de Lamoignon de Malesherbes and Madame de Pompadour, chief mistress of Louis XV, supported Diderot. Marie-Thérèse Rodet Geoffrin (1699–1777) paid part of the publishing costs of the Encyclopédie. From 1749 to 1777 she held a fortnightly salon, inviting artists, intellectuals, men of letters and philosophers. The other great salon of the time was that of Claudine Guérin de Tencin. In the 1720s, Voltaire exiled himself in England, where he absorbed Locke's ideas.

The philosophers were, in general, less hostile to monarchical rule than they were to that of the clergy and the nobility. In his defence of Jean Calas, Voltaire defended Royal justice against the excesses of fantastical provincial courts. Many European monarchs – Charles III of Spain, Maria Theresa of the House of Habsburg, Joseph II, Holy Roman Emperor, Catherine II of Russia, Gustave III of Sweden – met with philosophers such as Voltaire, who was presented to the Court of Frederick the Great, and Diderot, who was presented to the Court of Catherine the Great. Philosophers such as d'Holbach were advocates of "enlightened absolutism" in the hope that their ideas would spread more quickly if they had the approval of the Head of State. Subsequent events would show the philosophers the limits of such an approach with sovereigns who were plus despotes qu'éclairés, "more absolutist than enlightened". Only Rousseau stuck rigidly to the revolutionary ideal of political equality.

==== Notable members ====
===== France =====
- Pierre Bayle, Émilie du Châtelet, Étienne Bonnot de Condillac, Nicolas de Condorcet, Denis Diderot, Jean le Rond D'Alembert, Olympe de Gouges, Vincent de Gournay, D'Holbach, Bernard Le Bouyer de Fontenelle, Claude-Adrien Helvétius, Gilbert du Motier de La Fayette, Antoine Laurent de Lavoisier, La Mettrie, Louis de Jaucourt, Jean-François Marmontel, Pierre Louis Moreau de Maupertuis, Montesquieu, François Quesnay, Antoine Destutt de Tracy, Anne Robert Jacques Turgot, Voltaire, Georges-Louis Leclerc de Buffon

===== World =====
- England: Anthony Collins, John Locke, Edward Gibbon, William Godwin, Henry St John, 1st Viscount Bolingbroke, Samuel Johnson, James Oglethorpe, William Paley, Joseph Priestley, William Wilberforce, Mary Wollstonecraft
- Ireland: George Berkeley, Richard Cantillon, John Toland
- Germany (Prussia): Friedrich Heinrich Jacobi, Johann Gottfried von Herder, Immanuel Kant, Gotthold Ephraim Lessing, Moses Mendelssohn
- Italy: Cesare Beccaria, Ferdinando Galiani, Mario Pagano, Giambattista Vico, Pietro Verri, Alessandro Verri, Antonio Genovesi, Carlo Goldoni, Giuseppe Parini
- Poland: Hugo Kołłątaj, Jean Potocki, Ignacy Krasicki
- Portugal: Sebastião José de Carvalho e Melo, 1st Marquis of Pombal, Luís António Verney, António Nunes Ribeiro Sanches, Francisco de Oliveira, Duarte Ribeiro de Macedo, Matias Aires Ramos da Silva Eça
- Russia: Nikolay Ivanovich Novikov, Mikhail Lomonosov
- Romania: Ion Budai-Deleanu, Ienăchiţă Văcărescu, Anton Pann, Samuil Micu, Gheorghe Șincai
- Scotland: James Boswell, David Hume, Francis Hutcheson, James Burnett, Lord Monboddo, Adam Smith, James Watt
- Spain: Antonio José Cavanilles, Pedro Rodríguez de Campomanes, Benito Jerónimo Feijoo, Lorenzo Hervás y Panduro, Gaspar Melchor de Jovellanos, Leandro Fernández de Moratín, José Celestino Mutis
- Switzerland (Geneva): Jean-Jacques Rousseau
- United States: John Adams, Samuel Adams, Benjamin Franklin, Alexander Hamilton, John Jay, Thomas Jefferson, James Madison, Thomas Paine, George Washington

=== Dissemination ===
The spread of literacy and reading allowed the development of what may be called an espace public, "public space"; intellectual and political debate was no longer confined to the inner circle of the administrative class and the élite, encompassing larger parts of society. This process of dissemination of new ideas was increased by new methods of communication. Parts of the Encyclopédie, were read by the nobility and the upper class in literary salons, with those present giving their opinions on the writings of philosophers. Newspapers and the postal service allowed a more rapid exchange of ideas throughout Europe, resulting in a new form of cultural unity.

==== Encylopédistes ====
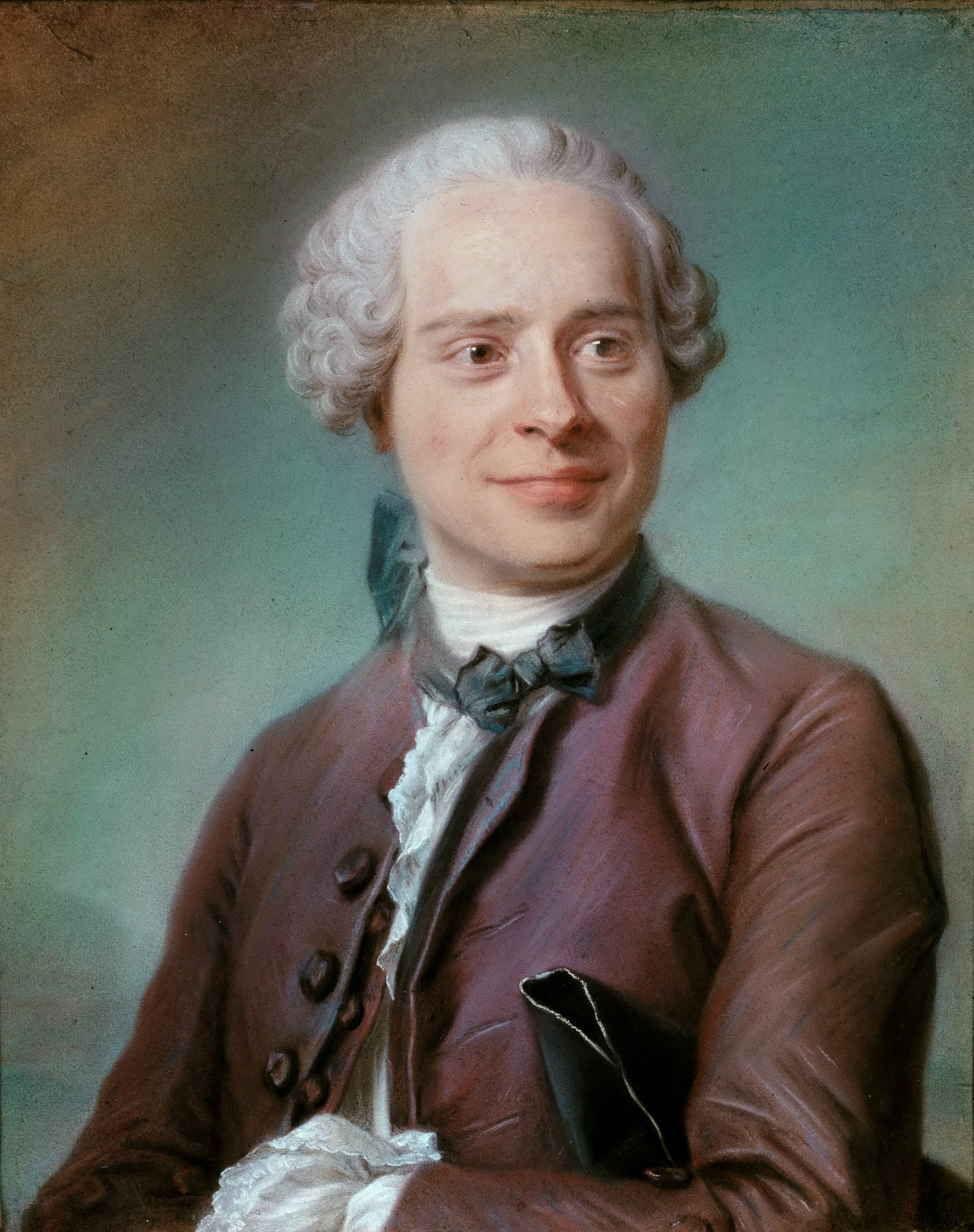
Jean le Rond d'Alembert (1753) by Maurice Quentin de La Tour

A second important change by the Enlightenment, looking back to the previous century, had its origin in France with the Encyclopédistes. This intellectual movement supported the idea that there was a structural model of both scientific and moral knowledge, that this model was innate and that its expression was a form of human liberation. Starting 1751, Denis Diderot and Jean le Rond d'Alembert published the Encyclopédie ou Dictionnaire raisonné des sciences, des arts et des métiers ("Systematic Encyclopaedia or Dictionary of Science, Arts and Crafts"). This raised questions on who should have the liberty to get hold of such information; the Press played an important role in the dissemination of ideas during the French Revolution.

==== Salons and cafés ====
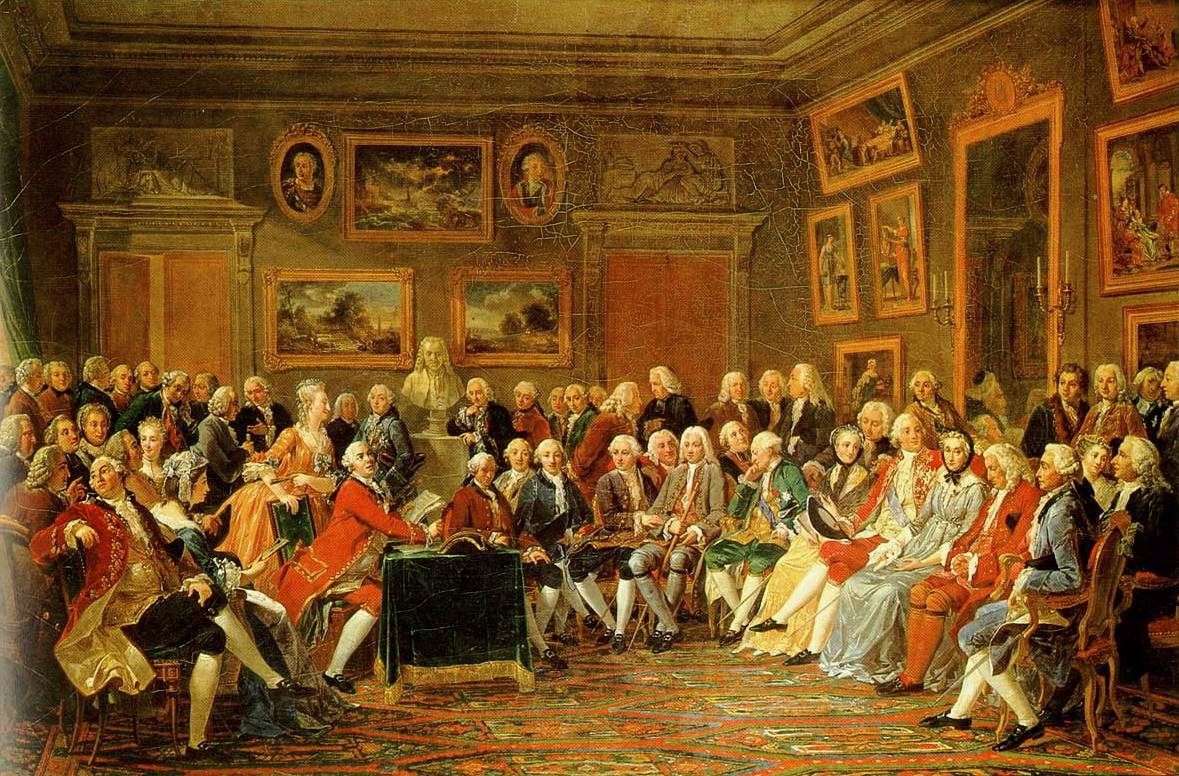
In the Salon of Madame Geoffrin in 1755 (1812) by Anicet Charles Gabriel Lemonnier

At first, literary cafés such as the Café Procope in Paris, were the favoured night-time haunt of young poets and critics, who could read and debate, and bragg about their latest success in the theatre or bookshops. But these were eclipsed by salons littéraires (Literary cafés), open to all who had some talent, at least for public speaking. Their defining characteristic was their intellectual mix; men would gather to express their views and satisfy their thirst for knowledge and to establish their world-view. But it was necessary to be "introduced" into these salons: grandes dames received artists, thinkers and philosophers. Each hostess had her day, her speciality and her special guests. The model example is the hotel of Madame de Lambert (Anne-Thérèse de Marguenat de Courcelles) at the turn of the century.

Men would attend these salons to present their ideas and receive feedback from an educated audience. The grandes dames who hosted these salons played an active role in moderating discussions. Many hostesses were writers and diarists themselves.

This social mixing was particularly prominent in 18th-century France, in the "États Généraux de l'esprit humain" ("General States of Human Spirit") where Enlightenment philosophy flourished. Some cultured women were treated as equal to the men on questions of religion, politics and science, and could bring a certain stylishness to debate, for example the contributions of Anne Dacier to the Quarrel of the Ancients and the Moderns, and the works of Émilie du Châtelet.

==== Academies, libraries and clubs ====
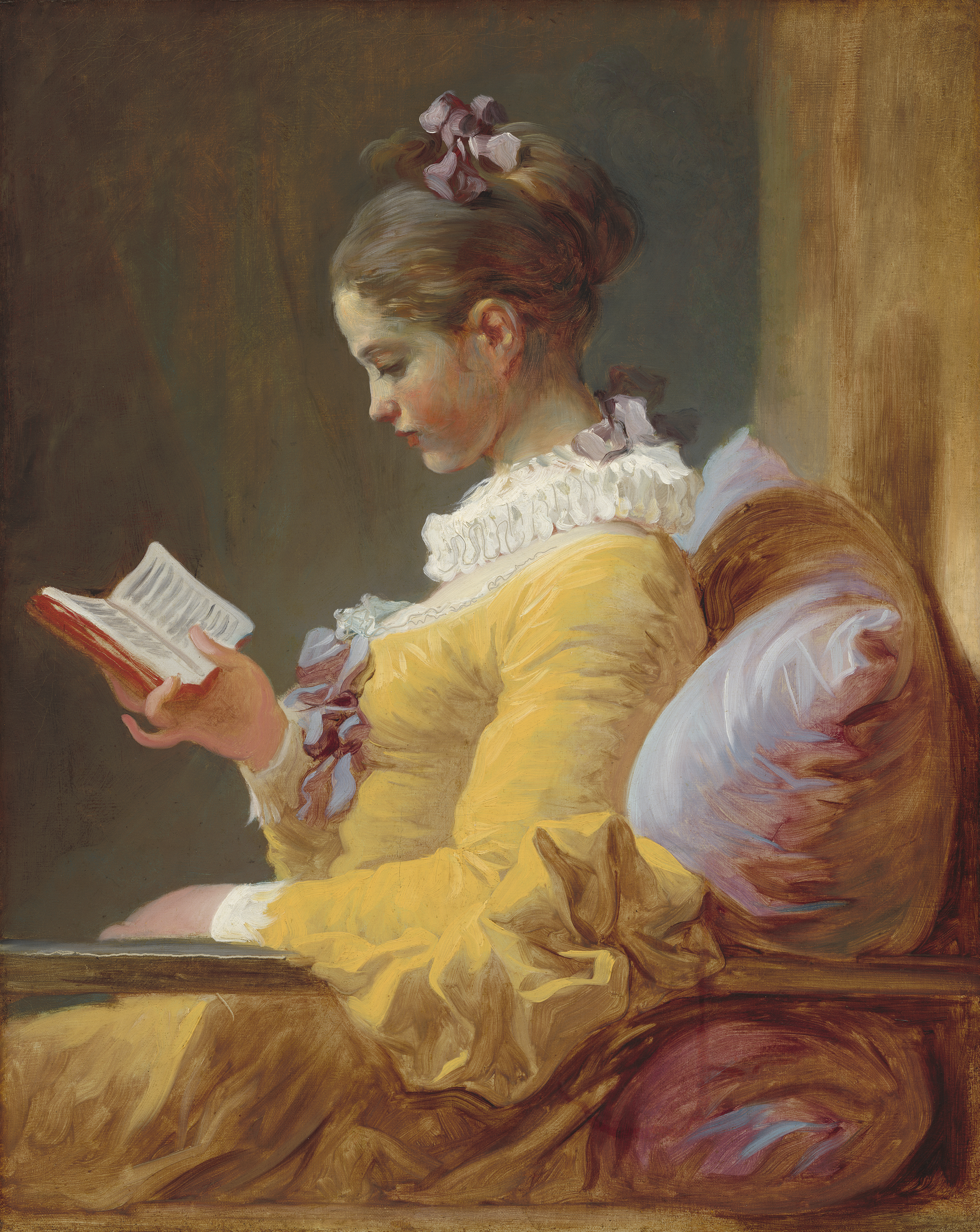
La Lecture (c. 1770) by Jean-Honoré Fragonard

The Académies were learned societies which were formed to collate and disseminate works of literature and science. In France, several Royal institutions were set up in the 17th century (the Académie française in 1634; the Académie des inscriptions et belles-lettres in 1663; the Académie royale des sciences in 1666; the Académie royale d'architecture in 1671),; other societies were set up in Paris, such as the Académie nationale de médecine in 1731 and the Académie nationale de médecine in 1776. Clergy and, to a lesser extent, nobility formed the majority of the membership.

Provincial societies acted to bond together the intellectual élite of French towns. Their social composition shows that privileged men were less prominent than in Paris: 37% from the nobility, 20% from the Church. Commoners represented the other 43%. Merchants and manufacturers were a small minority (4%).

Neighbouring academies, public libraries and lecture halls flourished, often involving the same enthusiastic men of learning. They were often supported by individual rich men, or funded by public subscription. They collected scientific works, the great dictionaries, had a lecture hall and, nearby, a discussion room.

All learned societies functioned as open salons and formed provincial, national and Europe-wide networks, exchanging books and letters, welcoming visiting members, and launching research and teaching programmes in subjects such as physics, chemistry, mineralogy, agronomy, and demography.

In the British Thirteen Colonies of North America, James Bowdoin (1726–1790), John Adams (1735–1826) and John Hancock (1737–1793) founded the American Academy of Arts and Sciences at Boston during the American War of Independence. In 1743, Benjamin Franklin founded the American Philosophical Society. At the start of the 19th century, Thomas Jefferson had one of the largest private libraries in the country.

Of all the learned societies, the most advanced was that of the Freemasons, although restricted to the upper classes. Having its origin in Great Britain, freemasonry embraced all the characteristics of Enlightenment philosophers: God-fearing, tolerant, liberal, humanist, aesthetic. It took Europe by storm, where it had thousands of lodged by 1789. In civil, military and even religious walks of life, it did particularly well in becoming part of the State apparatus. Neither anticlerical (which they became in the 19th century) nor revolutionary, masonic lodges helped to expand on philosophical ideas and the spirit of reform in their political strategies. Intellectual discussion took on an esoteric, or sectarian, nature. Masonic lodges, even more than the Academies, emphasised the importance of equality according to ability rather than privilege by birth.

==== Hawkers and printers ====
The spread of ideas of Enlightenment philosophers relied just as heavily on the actions of travelling traders. As they moved from town to town, they took their ideas and news with them, and could spread it by word of mouth to the illiterate.

The Press had helped to spread philosophical tracts (notably Diderot and d'Álembert's Encyclopédie), and encouraged the habit of reflective thought in the populace. In the end, the Press helped form public opinion, in spite of the ever-present censorship. Periodicals included the Journal des savants, also known as the Journal des Sçavans, the Mercure de France, and economic periodicals such as the Éphémérides du citoyen under Nicolas Baudeau of the Économistes party and François Quesnay of the Physiocrates. By cataloguing books and with subscriptions to learned societies, a public far from the centre of political activity could keep up with new ideas, discoveries and debates every month, if not every day.

=== Political influence ===
By the end of the 17th century, John Locke had defined the separation of powers of government as between the executive branch and legislative branch. In De l'esprit des lois (1748) Montesquieu resurrected the idea of the separation of powers and extended it to include a third power, the judicial branch.

In the 1750s attempts were made in England, Austria, Prussia and France to "rationalise" their monarchs and their laws.

The "enlightened"' (French: lumineuse) idea of a "rational" (or "systematic"; French: rationnel) government was cast into the American Declaration of Independence and, to a lesser extent, in the manifesto of Jacobinism during the French Revolution. It propagated to the United States Constitution of 1787.

==== American Revolution ====
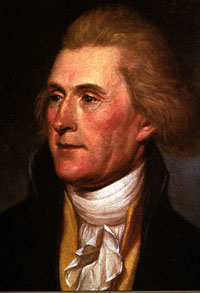
Thomas Jefferson (1791) by Charles Willson Peale

Thomas Jefferson, a cultured and learned man and one of the original planters of the State of Virginia, was well known to the English philosopher John Locke, and the Genevan Jean-Jacques Rousseau. He presided over the drafting of the Constitution of Virginia in 1776, from which he took certain parts when drafting the American Declaration of Independence, proclaimed on 4 July 1776 at the Second Continental Congress in Philadelphia. In the summer of 1784, he travelled to Europe to take over the duties of Benjamin Franklin as Ambassador of the United States to France, and during this time he met many of Enlightenment philosophers, becoming a frequent visitor to literary salons and bookshops in Paris.

The influence of Enlightenment philosophy is apparent in the Declaration of Independence, with the proclamations that all men are created equal and its opposition to tyranny. The 1787 United States Constitution restates Montesquieu's principle of the separation of powers into legislative, executive and judicial branches, which together form the foundations of modern democracy.

==== French Revolution ====
As the philosophy took hold in the salons, the cafés and the clubs, the absolute rule of the monarch disintegrated, in part because of opposition by the French nobility who saw no future for themselves in reform.

During the French Revolution, philosophical ideas informed political debate. The majority of deputies to the National Assembly were from the cultured bourgeois class, who aspired to ideas of liberty and equality. For example, Maximilien de Robespierre was an enthusiastic follower of Rousseau. But most of the French philosophers died before seeing their seedlings planted during the Revolution bear fruit, with the exception of Nicolas de Condorcet, Louis Sébastien Mercier and Abbé Raynal. The first two of these three Girondists fell out of favour; only the third came out with honour, even, after his death in 1796, having a bust made in honour of his essays on the abolition of black slavery, on 4 February 1794 (in the Gregorian calendar; 16 pluviôse of year II in the French Republican Calendar). He was also the uncle of a conventionnel régicide, Simon Camboulas.

The French Revolution in particular represents a violent application of Enlightenment philosophy, especially during the Reign of Terror, the interregnum of the Jacobins. Descartes characterised the desire for a "rational" and "spiritual" revolution as one that aimed to eradicate the Church, and Christianity, entirely.

The National Convention revoked the French Republican Calendar, the system of measurement of time, and the system of currency, while making the goal of equality, both social and economic, the highest priority of the State.

== See also ==
- Gazette de Leyde
- Political Spectrum
- Lettres d'une Péruvienne by Françoise de Graffigny
- Modernity
- Rationalism
- Universalism

== Sources ==
- Cassirer, Ernst (1951). The Philosophy of the Enlightenment. Princeton University Press. doi:10.2307/j.ctvfxv8q1. JSTOR j.ctvfxv8q1.
- Forsyth, Murray (1987). Reason and Revolution: The Political Thought of the Abbé Sieyes.
- Hazard, Paul (2013) [1935]. The Crisis of the European Mind: 1680–1715. Translated by May, James Lewis. New York: New York Review Books. ISBN 978-1590176191.
- McMahon, Darrin M. (2001). Enemies of the Enlightenment: The French Counter-Enlightenment and the Making of Modernity (2002 ed.). Oxford University Press. ISBN 978-0195158939.
