= Forsythe (surname) =

Forsythe is a surname.

Notable people and characters with the name include:

== People ==
- Abe Forsythe (born 1981), Australian actor
- Alexandra Illmer Forsythe (1918–1980), American computer scientist
- Clifford Forsythe (1929–2000), Northern Ireland politician
- Diana E. Forsythe (1947–1997), American anthropologist
- Drew Forsythe (born 1949), Australian entertainer
- George Forsythe (1917–1972), American mathematician and computer scientist
- Gerald Forsythe, motorsport businessman
- Henderson Forsythe (1917–2006), American actor
- Jack A. "Pee Wee" Forsythe, American football player and coach
- John Forsythe (1918–2010), American actor
- Keith Forsythe (1927–2003), New Zealand athlete
- Linda Forsythe (born 1950), American model
- Mark Forsythe (born 1965), Northern Irish long jumper
- Michael Forsythe, American journalist
- Robert E. Forsythe, American economist
- Stone Forsythe (born 1997), American football player
- William Forsythe (actor) (born 1955), American actor
- William Forsythe (dancer) (born 1949), American dancer and choreographer
- William E. Forsythe (1881–1969), American optometrist

== Fictional characters ==
- Adam Forsythe, in a British soap opera
- Miss Forsythe, a minor character in Arthur Miller's Death of a Salesman
- Stacey Forsythe, one of the main characters of Dead Rising 2
- Pax and Pri Forsythe, main characters of the Beyblade Burst QuadStrike anime
- Felix Forsythe (commonly known as fmoney), one of the main characters in the movie Frenzy
- Ariana Forsythe, main character in Linore Rose Burkard's Christian romance novel, Before the Season Ends

== See also ==
- Forsyth (surname)
- Clan Forsyth
