= Forsythe =

Forsythe may refer to:

- Forsythe (surname), including a list of people with the name
- Forsythe Technology, Inc., an American business
- Edwin B. Forsythe National Wildlife Refuge, a United States conservation area
- Forsythe Championship Racing, a racing team
- Forsythe (programming language), a programming language by John C. Reynolds based on ALGOL 60
- Forsythe Pendleton Jones, in the Archie comics, the formal name for Jughead Jones

== See also ==
- Forsyte (disambiguation)
- Forsyth (disambiguation)
