= Forsyth =

Forsyth may refer to:

== Places ==
=== Oceania ===
- Forsyth Island, Queensland, Australia, one of the West Wellesley Islands (aka Forsyth Islands)
- Forsyth Island, Tasmania, Australia
- Forsyth Island (New Zealand), in the outer Marlborough Sounds of South Island
- Lake Forsyth, New Zealand
- Forsyth Bluff, Australia, see West Cape Howe National Park
- Forsyth Peak, in the Cruzen Range of Victoria Land

=== United States ===
- Forsyth, Georgia, a city
- Forsyth, Illinois, a village
- Forsyth, Missouri, a city
- Forsyth, Montana, a city
- Forsyth County, North Carolina
- Forsyth County, Georgia
- Forsyth Township, Michigan
- Forsyth Street, Manhattan, New York
- Forsyth Park, Savannah, Georgia
- Forsyth Peak (California), a mountain
- James and Mary Forsyth House, listed on the National Register of Historic Places

== People ==
- Forsyth (surname), a list of people with the surname Forsyth
- Forsyth (given name), a list of people with the given name Forsyth
- Clan Forsyth, a Scottish clan

== Other ==
- The Forsyth Institute, an oral health research institute based in Boston, Massachusetts
- Forsyth Medical Center, Winston-Salem, North Carolina
- Forsyth Technical Community College, Winston-Salem, North Carolina
- USS Forsyth (PF-102), a United States Navy patrol frigate in commission from 1945 to 1946
- Forsyth (St. Louis MetroLink), a light rail station

== See also ==
- Forsyte (disambiguation)
- Forsythe (disambiguation)
- Forsyth–Edwards Notation (FEN), in chess
