= David Forsyth =

David Forsyth may refer to:

- David Forsyth (actor) (born 1947), American soap opera actor
- David Forsyth (chess player) (1854–1909), Scottish and New Zealand chess writer and inventor of Forsyth notation
- David Forsyth (computer scientist), contemporary American computer scientist
- David Forsyth (soccer) (1852–1936), Canadian educator and soccer player and administrator
- David Forsyth (field hockey) (born 1989), Scottish field hockey player

== See also ==
- Forsyth (surname) for other people named Forsyth
- Forsyth (disambiguation) for other things named Forsyth
