= James Forsyth =

James Forsyth may refer to:

- James Forsyth (Australian politician) (1852–1927), Member of the Queensland Legislative Assembly
- James Forsyth (college president) (1817–1886), attorney and president of Rensselaer Polytechnic Institute
- James Forsyth (journalist) (born 1981), Political Secretary to the UK Prime Minister
- James Forsyth (sculptor) (1827–1910), Scottish sculptor
- James Forsyth (traveller) (1838–1871), Indian traveller
- James B. Forsyth (1809–1872), Massachusetts physician and politician
- James Bell Forsyth (1802–1869), Quebec merchant and author
- James W. Forsyth (1834–1906), U.S. Army officer and general
- Jim Forsyth (born 1944), former Australian rules footballer
- Jimmy Forsyth (1904–1982), Scottish footballer, trainer and physiotherapist
- Jimmy Forsyth (photographer) (1913–2009), British amateur photographer
