= Forsyth (given name) =

Forsyth is a given name. It may refer to:

- Peter Forsyth Christensen (born 1952), American prelate of the Roman Catholic Church in Idaho
- Joseph Forsyth Johnson (1840–1906), English landscape architect and disciple of John Ruskin
- Robert Forsyth Macgeorge (1796–1859), early settler of South Australia, founder of the Adelaide suburb of Urrbrae
- David Forsyth Main (1831–1880), 19th-century member of parliament in Otago, New Zealand
- Charles Immanuel Forsyth Major (1843–1923), Swiss zoologist and vertebrate palaeontologist
- Frederick Forsyth Pardee, KC (1866–1927), Ontario barrister and political figure
- Ivor Forsyth Porter CMG, OBE (1913–2012), British Ambassador and author
- Robert Forsyth Scott (1849–1933), mathematician, barrister and Master of St John's College, Cambridge
- Sharpe, William Forsyth (born 1934), American economist
- Thomas Forsyth Torrance, MBE, FRSE, FBA (1913–2007), Scottish Protestant theologian
- John Forsyth Wright (1892–1947), Tasmanian politician
- Annie Forsyth Wyatt (1885–1961), OBE, Australian community worker, conservationist, Red Cross worker

== See also ==
- Forsyth (disambiguation)
- Forsyth (surname)
