= Thomas Forsyth =

Thomas Forsyth may refer to:

- Thomas Forsyth (footballer) (1892–?), Scottish amateur footballer
- Thomas Forsyth (Indian agent) (1771–1833), American frontiersman, trader, and Indian agent
- Thomas Forsyth (New Zealand politician) (1868–1941), New Zealand Member of Parliament
- Thomas Douglas Forsyth (1827–1886), Anglo-Indian administrator and diplomat
- Thomas H. Forsyth (1842–1908), American soldier and Medal of Honor recipient
- Tom Forsyth (1949–2020), Scottish football player and manager

== See also ==
- Tom Forsythe, American artist and Tai Chi instructor
- Thomas Forsyth House in Utah, USA
