= Forsyte =

Forsyte is included in:

- The Forsyte Saga, a series of British novels
- USS Irene Forsyte (IX-93), an ill-fated North American schooner

== See also ==
- Forsyth (disambiguation)
- Forsythe (disambiguation)
