= George Forsyth =

George Forsyth may refer to

- George Forsyth (footballer) (born 1982), Peruvian international footballer and politician
- George Forsyth (harbourmaster) (1843–1894), Fremantle harbourmaster
- George Forsyth (trade unionist) (1898–1974), New Zealand unionist and politician
- George Alexander Forsyth (1837–1915), American cavalry officer

== See also ==
- George Forsythe (1917–1972), computer scientist and mathematician
- George I. Forsythe (1918–1987), U.S. Army general
