= William Forsythe =

William Forsythe may refer to:

- William Forsythe (actor) (born 1955), American actor
- William Forsythe (choreographer) (born 1949), American dancer and choreographer
- William Forsythe (canoeist), Australian slalom canoeist; see 2008 Canoe Slalom World Cup
- William E. Forsythe (1881–1969), president of the Optical Society of America

== See also ==
- William Forsyth (disambiguation)
