= Clan Forsyth =

Scottish clan

- Fearsithe
- Crest: A griffin sergeant Azure, armed and membered Sable, crowned Or
- Motto: Instaurator ruinae (A repairer of ruin)

Profile
- Region: Lowlands

Chief
- Alistair Forsyth of that Ilk, Baron of Ethie
- Chief of the Name and Arms of Forsyth
- Seat: Ethie Castle
- Historic seat: Forsyth Castle; Inchnoch Castle

Clan Forsyth (Scottish Gaelic: Clann Fearsithe, IPA:[ˈkʰɫ̪aun̴̪ˈfɛɾʃɪhə]) is a Scottish clan.

== History ==
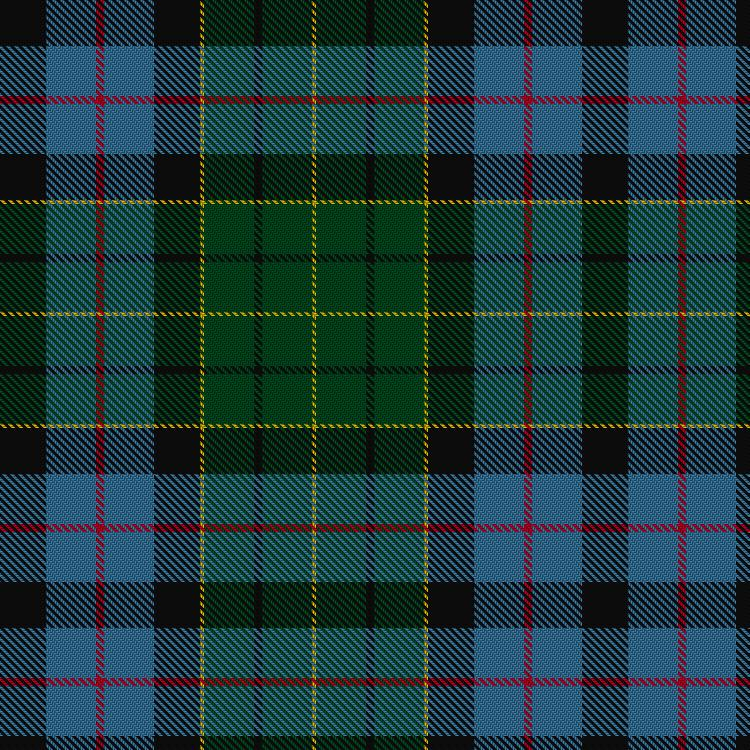
Forsyth tartan

=== Origins of the clan ===
The Clan Forsyth's history dates back to before the twelfth century and as is usually the case with families who date back this far, the derivation of the family's surname is uncertain. If the name is of Celtic origin, then it may derive from Fearsithe, which is Scottish Gaelic for man of peace.

=== Wars of Scottish Independence ===
In 1296 William de Fersith appears on the Ragman Rolls submitting to Edward I of England. Sometime after 1306, Osbert, the son of Robert de Forsyth, received a grant for the lands of Sauchie in Stirlingshire from Robert the Bruce. During the Wars of Scottish Independence Osbert distinguished himself at the Battle of Bannockburn and received confirmation of the realm of his lands under the great seal in 1320.

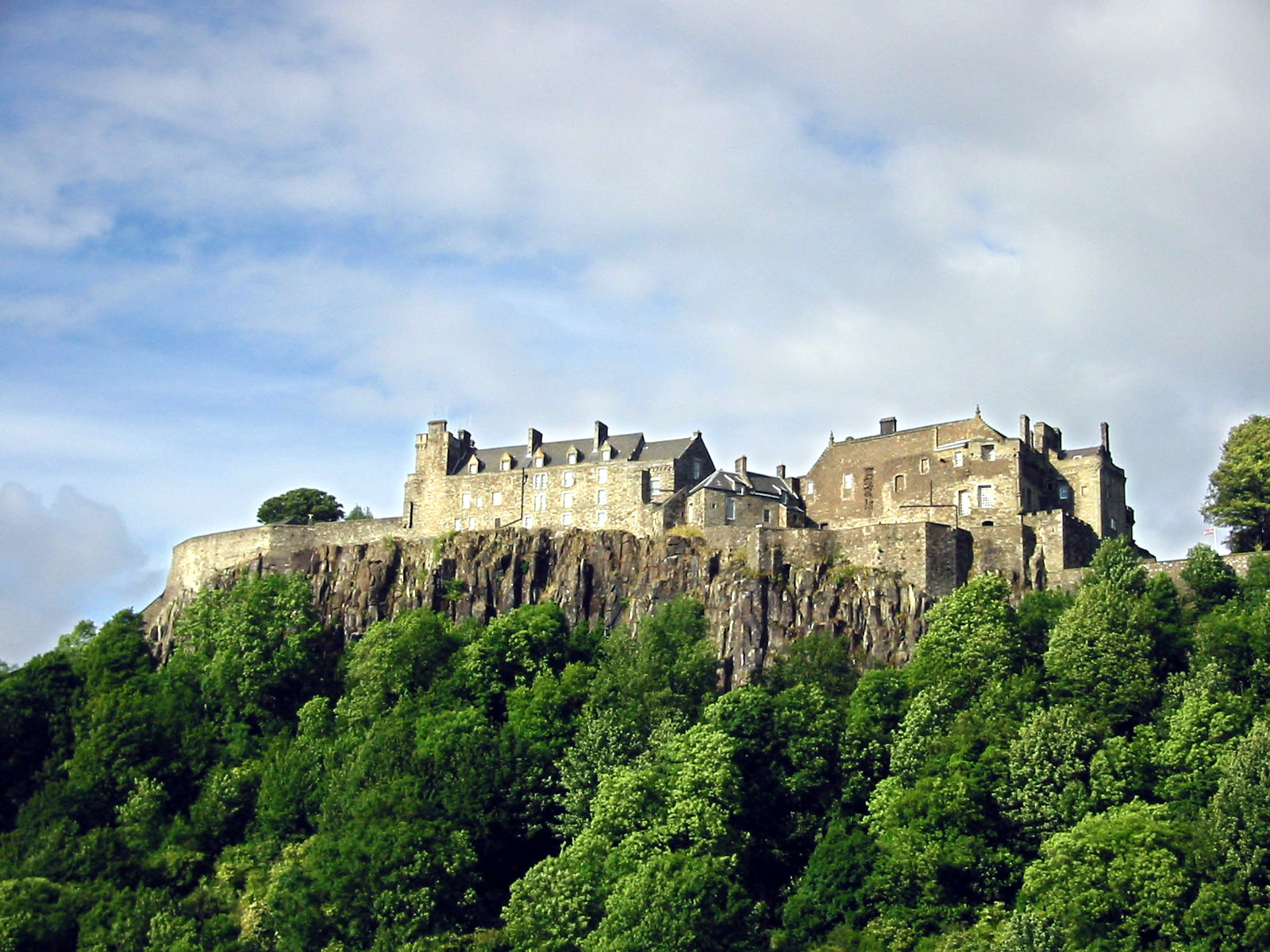
Stirling Castle, from the "King's Knot" gardens below the Castle Hill

In 1368 Osbert's son was appointed as the king's macer and as constable of Stirling Castle. Fersith the clerk received a royal pension of one hundred pounds from Robert II of Scotland. Many prominent burgesses and civic dignitaries bore the name and the family became settled around Stirling.

=== 14th, 15th and 16th centuries ===
Sometime before 1488, David Forsyth of Dykes acquired his lands in Lanarkshire. He specifically claimed the de Fronsocs as his ancestors and his seal bore heraldry similar to their arms. Forsyth Castle which was at Dykes was demolished in 1828. A branch of the clan moved from Dykes to Inchnoch Castle in Monklands and their descendants spread throughout Glasgow and Ayrshire.

William Forsyth had been baillie of Edinburgh in around 1365 and his son, William, moved to St Andrews in 1423 where he subsequently acquired the barony of Nydie. Alexander the fourth Baron of Nydie died at the Battle of Flodden in 1513. His grandson, James, married Elizabeth Leslie who was a granddaughter of the Earl of Rothes and a great-granddaughter of James III of Scotland. The Forsyths fortunes were tied to their extremely powerful relatives and they acquired lands near the royal Falkland Palace. John Forsyth was appointed the king's macer in 1538 and later Falkland Pursuivant. The present chiefs of Clan Forsyth are descended from the Falkland Forsyths.

=== 17th, 18th and 19th centuries ===
Another branch of the Clan Forsyth settled near Monymusk and William Forsyth represented Forres in the Parliament of 1621. Alexander John Forsyth was a pioneer in the development of modern firearms. In the eighteenth century his work led to the replacement of the flintlock with the percussion lock.

William Forsyth (b.1737), was a distinguished horticulturalist who went to London to study botanical gardens in Chelsea. He was appointed Chief Superintendent of the royal Kensington Gardens and St James's Palace in 1784.

Peter Taylor Forsyth (b.1848) was Principal of Hackney Theological College and in 1909 published his most influential work, The Person and Place of Jesus Christ.

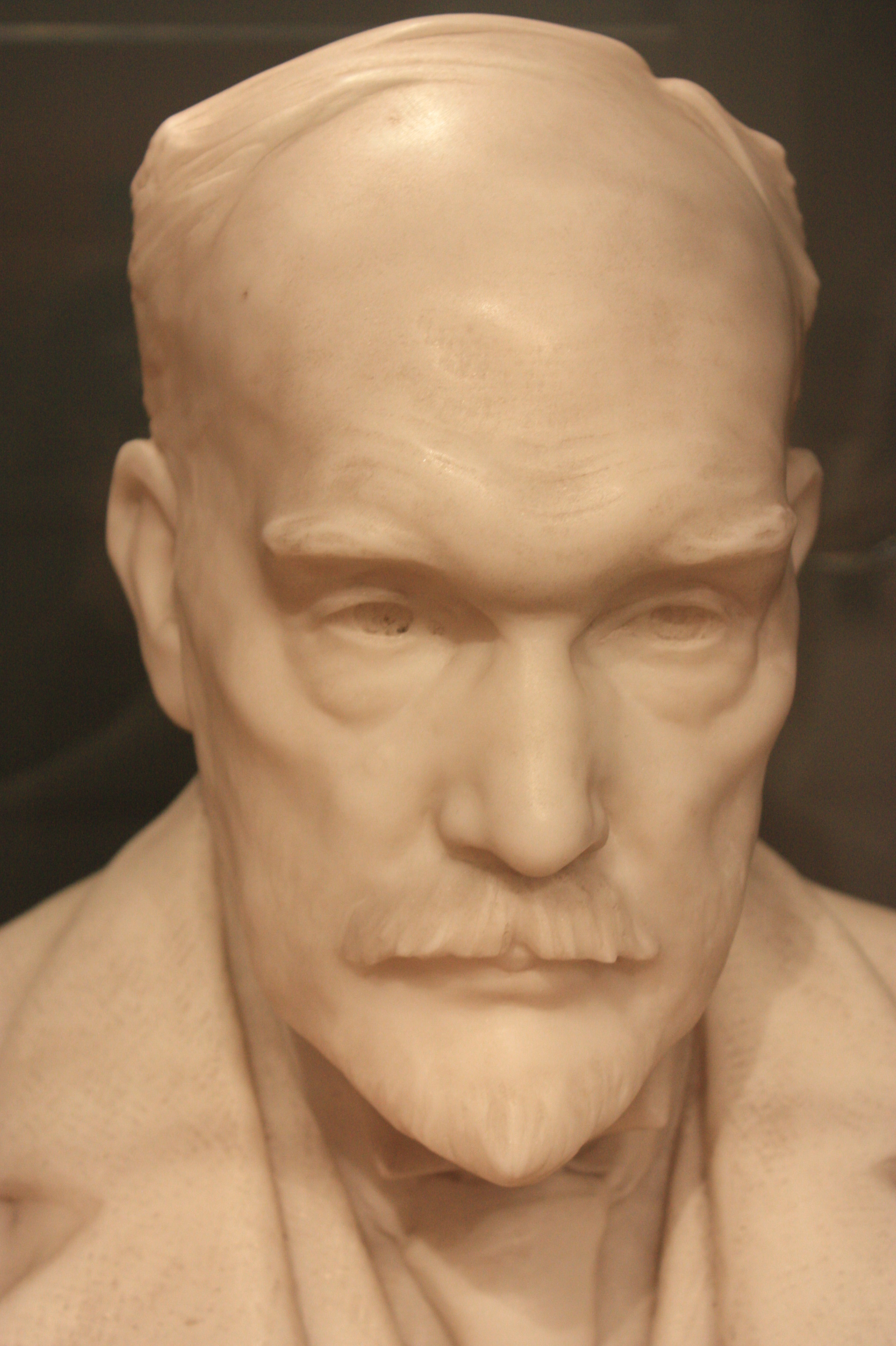
Robert Wallace Forsyth, 1843-1937

Robert Wallace Forsyth (b. 1843) founded his eponymous chain of departments stores, RW Forsyth, in Glasgow in 1872. By 1925 RW Forsyth had expanded into Edinburgh's Princes Street and London's Regent Street. The business remained in family ownership for 111 years until it was sold in 1983. A marble bust of Forsyth by Sir William Reid Dick R.A. is on display at the People's Palace, Glasgow.

== Clan chief ==
When, in 1672, Charles II instituted a public register of the clans the then chief of Clan Forsyth refused to attend. The clan was subsequently stripped of its recognition and the chief lost his legal title. This situation continued for the next 300 years until St. Andrews Day 1978 when Lord Lyon, King of Arms, accepted the claim of Alistair Forsyth, the Baron of Ethie, to become Chief of the Forsyth clan.

Alistair Forsyth resides in a Li chateau having set up a Highland cattle ranch in Western Australia.

Allan Forsyth acts as Clan commissioner in New Zealand

== Clan societies ==
The Forsyth Family Association was founded in 1915 with the goal of uniting the clan and finding an heir to the chieftainship, which had been vacant since 1672. The present Clan Forsyth Society was formed in 1977 and has branches in the United Kingdom, the United States, Australia, and New Zealand.

The Clan Forsyth Society U.S.A. has been in existence since 1994, succeeding an earlier Clan Forsyth Society of America. Its constitution was accepted at the Grandfather Mountain Highland Games in Linville, North Carolina. The society publishes a newsletter called The Griffin and maintains an active online community. Members host clan tents at Highland games and Celtic festivals throughout North America, including events in Maryland, Virginia, West Virginia, North Carolina, Pennsylvania, Ohio, Florida, Utah, and New Hampshire among others.

The parent Clan Forsyth Society in the United Kingdom holds an annual gathering in central Scotland and circulates an annual newsletter to members worldwide.

== Clan Castles ==
- Ethie Castle, Angus & Dundee: About 5 miles north east of Arbroath, on minor roads 2 miles east of A92, about 0.75 miles west of the sea, at Ethie Castle. Now in private ownership. www.ethiecastle.com for more details.
- Inchnoch Castle, Lanarkshire & Glasgow area: About 2.5 miles north of Coatbridge, on minor roads north of B804, about 0.5 miles north east of Mamock. (Ruin – Slight remains survive of a tower house).
- Dykes Castle, Lanarkshire & Glasgow area: About 2 miles west of Stonehouse, on minor roads north of A71, just north of Glassford. (Ruin). Dykes was long a property of the Forsyth family and they built a castle here about 1350. The story goes that the family had defeated an English force and were given the property as a reward.
- Nydie Castle, Fife, about 5 miles west of St Andrews, on minor roads north of B939 or south of A91, south of River Eden, 2 miles north and west of Strathkinnes, at or near Nydie Mains. (Ruin). Nydie was a property of the Forsyth family from 1435 to 1608. 'Needy' is marked on the Atlus Novus map of Fife.
- Polmaise Castle, Stirlingshire & Clackmannan: about 3 miles east and south of Stirling, on minor roads north of A905, just north of Fallin, on southern shore of River Forth, at Polmaise. (Ruin). In the 14th century the lands of Polmaise Marischal were given to the Forsyths.
- Ecclesgreig Castle, located just northwest of St Cyrus, a coastal village in Aberdeenshire. The house and estate has had multiple names and families associated with it throughout the ages. Initially it was known as Criggie, then Mount Cyrus and finally given the name Ecclesgreig by the Forsyth-Grants. It identifies in the Forsyth-Grant ancestry in the period after 1843. House is a ruin and in private ownership. www.ecclesgreig.com for more details.

== See also ==
- Forsyth (surname)
- Forsyth–Edwards Notation, a standard notation for describing a particular board position of a chess game.
- USS Forsyth (PF-102), a United States Navy patrol frigate in commission from 1945 to 1946.
- The Forsyth Institute, an oral health research institute based in Boston, Massachusetts.
- Nicolas Denys, "Falsified Genealogies" Section.
- Forsyth, Montana
