= Forsythe Technology =

Forsythe Technology, Inc.
- Company type: Employee-owned
- Industry: IT services and Computer hardware
- Founded: Skokie, Illinois (1971)
- Founder: Rick Forsythe; Jim McArthur
- Headquarters: Skokie, Illinois, USA
- Number of locations: 50 (2014)
- Area served: Worldwide
- Key people: William P. Brennan, President & CEO
- Revenue: ▲US$ 1,109.2 million (2011)
- Operating income: ▲US$ 19.7 million (2011)
- Total assets: ▲US$ 481.7.0 million (2011)
- Total equity: ▲US$ 58.7 million (2011)
- Number of employees: 1000 (2014)
- Subsidiaries: Forsythe Federal Solutions Corp. Forsythe International, Inc. Forsythe McArthur Associates, Inc. Forsythe Solutions Group, Inc. Forsythe Technology Canada, Inc. Information Security Technology, Inc. (IST); Forsythe Data Centers Inc. KillerIT. Mentora Group. SOS Security. Synnefo Technology Solutions.
- Website: forsythe.com

Forsythe Technology, Inc. was an IT infrastructure, professional services and financial services company located in Skokie, Illinois.

== History ==
The company was founded in 1971 under the name Forsythe McArthur. With $200 in capital and a telephone on a dining room table as an office, founder Rick Forsythe and partner Jim McArthur started the company. In 1980 Jim McArthur sold his half of the company to Rick Forsythe. In 1982, Forsythe opened its first two offices to be located outside of Illinois in Georgia and Wisconsin. In 1988, the employee stock ownership program was established and in 2006 employees purchased the company from Rick Forsythe. In 2013 Forsythe reported its 43rd consecutive profitable year with revenues of $1.1 billion. In 2015 Forsythe formed the Meta7 division to focus solely on the Oracle Red Stack.

On May 1, 2018, Forsythe was acquired by Sirius Computer Solutions, Inc.
