= Keith Forsyth =

Australian rules footballer, born 1917

Personal information
- Full name: Keith Forsyth
- Born: 17 October 1917
- Died: 20 February 2006 (aged 88)
- Original team: Flemington-Kensington / Ascot Vale
- Height: 183 cm (6 ft 0 in)
- Weight: 91 kg (201 lb)

Playing career^{1}
Years	Club	Games (Goals)
1941	Essendon	2 (0)
- ^{1} Playing statistics correct to the end of 1941.

Keith Forsyth (17 October 1917 – 20 February 2006) was an Australian rules footballer who played with Essendon in the Victorian Football League (VFL).
