= Darrin McMahon =

American historian (born 1965)

Darrin M. McMahon (born 1965) is an American historian, author, public speaker, and currently a professor of history at Dartmouth College, where he is Mary Brinsmead Wheelock Professor of History. Prior to joining the Dartmouth Faculty, he was Ben Weider Professor and distinguished research professor at Florida State University.

Trained as a historian of France, his first book Enemies of the Enlightenment: The French Counter-Enlightenment and the Making of Modernity dealt with opposition within France to the Enlightenment legacy in the 18th and 19th centuries. He is also the author of Happiness: A History (Atlantic Monthly Books, 2006), and Divine Fury: A History of Genius (Basic Books, 2013).
