= Alexandra Illmer Forsythe =

American computer scientist

- Born: May 20, 1918; Newton, Massachusetts, US
- Died: January 2, 1980 (aged 61); Santa Clara County, California, US
- Education: Swarthmore College; Vassar; Brown University
- Known for: Writing the first computer science textbook
- Spouse: George Forsythe
- Children: Diana E. Forsythe
- Scientific career
- Fields: Mathematics, computer science
- Workplaces: Stanford University; University of Utah

Alexandra Winifred Illmer Forsythe (May 20, 1918 – January 2, 1980) was an American computer scientist best known for co-authoring a series of computer science textbooks during the 1960s and 1970s, including the first ever computer science textbook, Computer Science: A First Course, in 1969.

== Biography ==
Forsythe was born in Newton, Massachusetts and raised in Cortland, New York. She attended Swarthmore College, where she met her future husband George Forsythe, and earned her bachelor's degree in mathematics. She and George were both accepted to the PhD program in mathematics at Brown University. Although an exceptional student, she was unable to continue in the program because the dean did not approve of female mathematicians and cut her fellowship support. She eventually left Brown and completed her master's degree at Vassar College in 1941 while serving as an instructor.

In 1969, Forsythe published Computer Science: A First Course. In 1975, she published a second edition. In 1978, Forsythe and a co-author, E. I. Organick, published Programming Language Structures.

Forsythe taught at Stanford and the University of Utah.

Alexandra Forsythe was married to George Forsythe and helped establish the computer science program at Stanford University.

== Books ==
- Forsythe, Alexandra I.; Keenan, Thomas; Organick, Elliott; Sternberg, Warren (1969). Computer science: A First Course (1 ed.). New York: Wiley. p. 741. ISBN 0471266809.
- Forsythe, Alexandra I.; Keenan, Thomas; Organick, Elliott; Stenberg, Warren (1970). Computer science: BASIC Language (1 ed.). New York: Wiley. ISBN 0471266779.
- Organick, Elliott; Forsythe, Alexandra I.; Plummer, Robert (1978). Programming Language Structures (2 ed.). New York: Academic Press. ISBN 9780125282604.
