= Joseph Forsyth =

Scottish writer

Joseph Forsyth (18 February 1763 – 20 September 1815) was a Scottish writer on Italy.

== Life ==
Forsyth was born at Elgin, Scotland, on 18 February 1763, and was the son, by his second marriage, of Alexander Forsyth, merchant in Elgin, a man of intelligence and piety, and a friend of Isaac Watts. His mother, Ann Harrold, was the daughter of a farmer who fought for Prince Charles at Battle of Culloden, was taken prisoner, and died on board ship while being carried for trial to England. From the grammar school of his native town Forsyth passed aged 12 to King's College, Aberdeen, where he graduated M.A. in 1779. His parents intended him for the church, but his diffidence induced him to decline.

He went to London and became assistant to the master of an academy at Newington Butts; was soon able to purchase the establishment, and carried it on successfully for thirteen years. Then, his health failing, he gave up the school and returned to Elgin. He had now the leisure and the means to give effect to what had been the great desire of his life, a visit to Italy. The Peace of Amiens was known in Elgin on 7 October 1801. On the 12th Forsyth was already on his way south, and on Christmas Day he arrived at Nice. The next eighteen months he spent in the more famous cities of Italy, where he had access to the literary circles, and saw everything with the eyes of a man well read in the poets and historians of the country, both ancient and modern, a connoisseur in architecture and a keen observer of thought and life.

He was at Turin on his way home when the war was renewed, and on 25 May 1803 he was seized by the police and carried prisoner to Nismes, France. The restraint there was not severe, but Forsyth was caught in an attempt to escape, and was thereupon marched in midwinter to Fort de Bitché, where his confinement was at first intolerably strict. It was, however, gradually relaxed; after two years he was removed to Verdun, where he remained five years.

Through the influence of a lady in the suite of the king of Holland he was in 1811 permitted to reside in Paris; but four months after the English in the capital were ordered back to their places of detention, and the utmost relaxation Forsyth's literary friends could obtain for him was the permission to go to Valenciennes instead of to Verdun. It was not till the allies entered Paris in March 1814 that he regained his liberty.

After a year in London Reid returned to Elgin, intending to settle there; but his constitution, never robust, had been undermined by his thirteen years of detention. He died on 20 September 1815, and was buried in his parents' tomb in the Elgin Cathedral churchyard.

== Works ==
Napoleon represented himself as a patron of the arts; and Forsyth who had studied Italian literature and art produced a book in the hope of release. His Remarks on Antiquities, Arts, and Letters, during an Excursion in Italy in the years 1802 and 1803, were published in London in 1813, and copies were forwarded to Paris, but without result. A second edition appeared in 1816, with a memoir of the author by his brother Isaac, who survived till 1859, and it went through several later editions, one (1820) issued at Geneva. Forsyth himself says in his 'advertisement' that when he went to Italy he had no intention of writing a book. He wrote nothing else.
