= John Forsyth =

John Forsyth may refer to:

- John Forsyth (clothier), Canadian shirtmaker
- John Forsyth (footballer) (born 1918), Scottish footballer
- John Forsyth (general) (1867–1928), Australian major general
- John Forsyth (politician) (1780–1841), American politician from Georgia
- John Forsyth Jr. (1812–1877), American newspaper editor and son of the namesake politician
- John Duncan Forsyth (1886 or 1887–1963), Scottish-American architect

== See also ==
- John Forsythe (1918–2010), American actor
