= Diana E. Forsythe =

American anthropologist (1947–1997)

Diana Elizabeth Forsythe
- Born: November 11, 1947; Santa Monica, California, U.S.
- Died: August 14, 1997 (aged 49); North Slope Borough, Alaska, U.S.
- Citizenship: United States
- Education: Swarthmore College; Cornell University
- Scientific career
- Fields: Anthropology
- Workplaces: University of Pittsburgh; Stanford University; University of California, San Francisco

Diana Elizabeth Forsythe (November 11, 1947 – August 14, 1997) was a leading researcher in anthropology and a key figure in the field of science and technology studies. She is recognized for her significant anthropological studies of artificial intelligence and informatics, as well as for her studies on the roles of gender and power in computer engineering.

== Early life and education ==
Forsythe was born in 1947 in Santa Monica, California to computer scientists Alexandra Illmer Forsythe and George Forsythe. Her family moved to Palo Alto, California in 1957, and she attended Palo Alto High School. Forsythe attended Swarthmore College for her bachelor's degree in anthropology and sociology and earned her PhD in cultural anthropology and social demography from Cornell University in 1974. She completed fieldwork in Scotland and produced a number of papers on anthropology in Europe before turning her attention to knowledge engineering and medical informatics in the United States. She spent a year as a postdoctoral fellow in the Knowledge Systems Laboratory at Stanford University from 1987 to 1988. She worked as a research associate professor in the computer science and anthropology departments at the University of Pittsburgh before joining the faculty at the University of California, San Francisco. In 1994, she returned to Stanford as a visiting scholar for one year and then as a Systems Development Foundation Fellow at the Center for Biomedical Ethics in 1995. During this period she also started an oral history project focusing on the experiences of women in computer science.

== Death ==
In August 1997, Forsythe died during a hiking accident in northern Alaska.

== Legacy ==
Following her death, memorials were held at the annual meetings of the American Anthropological Association and the Society for Social Studies of Science.

In 2015, the Diana Forsythe Memorial fund began awarding the Forsythe Dissertation Award for Social Studies of Science, Technology, and Health to doctoral students in any social science field at the University of California, San Francisco or Stanford University.

=== Diana Forsythe Prize ===
The Diana Forsythe Prize was created in 1998 to recognize the best book or series of articles relating to feminist anthropological research on work, science, and technology. The Prize is awarded annually at the American Anthropological Association meeting and is supported by the General Anthropology Division.
