= Thomas Forsyth (footballer) =

Scottish footballer

Personal information
- Full name: Thomas Ernest Forsyth
- Date of birth: 10 May 1892
- Place of birth: Airdrie, Scotland
- Position: Inside forward

Senior career*
Years	Team	Apps	(Gls)
1911	Airdrieonians	1	(0)
1911–1914	Queen's Park	36	(6)
1914	Airdrieonians	3	(0)
- * Club domestic league appearances and goals

Thomas Ernest Forsyth was a Scottish amateur footballer who played as an inside forward in the Scottish League for Queen's Park and Airdrieonians.

== Personal life ==
As of 1911, Forsyth was a law student. He served as a lieutenant in the Royal Field Artillery during the First World War.

== Career statistics ==
Appearances and goals by club, season and competition
Club	Season	League			Scottish Cup		Other		Total	
Club	Season	Division	Apps	Goals	Apps	Goals	Apps	Goals	Apps	Goals
Airdrieonians	1910–11	Scottish First Division	1	0	—		—		1	0
Queen's Park	1911–12	Scottish First Division	2	0	0	0	0	0	2	0
Queen's Park	1912–13	Scottish First Division	28	5	2	0	3 (Note: 2 appearances in Glasgow Merchants Charity Cup, 1 appearance in Glasgow Cup)	0	33	5
Queen's Park	1913–14	Scottish First Division	6	1	0	0	0	0	6	1
Queen's Park	Total		36	6	2	0	3	0	41	6
Airdrieonians	1913–14	Scottish First Division	3	0	0	0	—		3	0
Airdrieonians	Total		4	0	0	0	—		4	0
Career total			40	6	2	0	3	0	45	6
