= Enemies of the Enlightenment =

2001 book by Darrin McMahon

Enemies of the Enlightenment: The French Counter-Enlightenment and the Making of Modernity
- Author: Darrin McMahon
- Language: English
- Publisher: Oxford University Press
- Publication date: 2001
- Publication place: United States
- Pages: 262
- ISBN: 978-0-19-515893-9

Enemies of the Enlightenment: The French Counter-Enlightenment and the Making of Modernity is a book about the Counter-Enlightenment, which challenged the ideas of the Enlightenment at the end of the early modern period. It was written by the American historian Darrin McMahon and published by Oxford University Press in 2001. McMahon rejects interpretations of the Counter-Enlightenment as a merely reactive force, instead presenting it as in possession of its own revolutionary ideology that needs be studied on its own merits.
