= William Forsyth =

William Forsyth may refer to:

- William Forsyth (artist) (1854–1935), American Impressionist painter
- William Forsyth (athlete) (1891–1939), Canadian long-distance runner
- William Forsyth (barrister) (1812–1899), Scottish lawyer and Member of Parliament
- William Forsyth (horticulturist) (1737–1804), Scottish botanist
- William Forsyth (merchant) (1722–1800), Scottish merchant
- William Forsyth (rugby union) (born 1850), international player who represented Scotland
- William Forsyth (writer) (1818–1879), Scottish poet and journalist
- William Austin Forsyth, Canadian politician
- Will Forsyth (1996–2020), rugby league footballer who played in the 2010s
- Bill Forsyth (diplomat) (1909–1993), Australian diplomat
- Bill Forsyth (born 1946), Scottish film director and writer

== See also ==
- William Forsythe (disambiguation)
