= Thomas H. Forsyth =

- Born: December 17, 1842; Hartford, Connecticut, United States
- Died: March 22, 1908 (aged 65); San Diego, California
- Burial place: Mount Hope Cemetery
- Military career
- Allegiance: United States
- Branch: United States Army
- Service years: c. 1876 – 1891
- Rank: First Sergeant
- Unit: 4th U.S. Cavalry
- Conflicts: Indian Wars; Powder River Expedition
- Awards: Medal of Honor

First Sergeant Thomas Hall Forsyth (December 17, 1842 – March 22, 1908) was an American soldier in the U.S. Army who served with the 4th U.S. Cavalry during the Indian Wars. He received the Medal of Honor for gallantry against the Cheyenne Indians, rescuing his commanding officer and another wounded soldier, at the Powder River in Wyoming Territory on November 25, 1876. Although two fellow soldiers assisted in helping him protect their fallen commander, he is the only member of the Powder River Expedition to receive an award.

== Biography ==
Thomas Hall Forsyth was born on December 17, 1842, to a wealthy family in Hartford, Connecticut. He later enlisted in the United States Army in St. Louis, Missouri, and had a long and successful military career serving with 4th U.S. Cavalry on the Texas frontier. A commissary sergeant at Fort Davis, his privileged background allowed him a certain lifestyle above that of the average enlisted man. He "enjoyed dancing and music", played chess and subscribed to several eastern newspapers. He also directed the post talent show and was a member of the local lodges of the Independent Order of Odd Fellows and Good Templars.

Twice wounded in campaigns during the Indian Wars, Forsyth held a commendable service record as an experienced Indian fighter. While battling the Cheyenne at Powder River in the Wyoming Territory, on November 25, 1876, Forsyth took command of Company M when First Lieutenant John A. McKinney was mortally wounded. As McKinney lay dying by the river, Forsyth and two other men, Sergeant Frank Murray and Corporal William J. Linn, remained at his side despite all being wounded themselves. After the battle, all three were recommended for the Medal of Honor by Lieutenant Harrison G. Otis. The War Department failed to acknowledge their actions, however, for nearly 20 years. It was not until 1891, after a petition by former adjutant Joseph H. Dorst and other officers, that Forsyth finally received the award. He was the only participant in the conflict to receive an honor. Forsyth died in San Diego, California, on March 22, 1908, at the age of 65. He was interred at the Mount Hope Cemetery. Vice Admiral Alan S. Thompson, U.S. Navy, is his great-great-grandson.

== Medal of Honor citation ==
Rank and organization: First Sergeant, Company M, 4th U.S. Cavalry. Place and date: At Powder River, Wyo., November 25, 1876. Entered service at:------. Birth: Hartford, Conn. Date of issue: July 14, 1891.

Citation:

Though dangerously wounded, he maintained his ground with a small party against a largely superior force after his commanding officer had been shot down during a sudden attack and rescued that officer and a comrade from the enemy.

== See also ==
- List of Medal of Honor recipients for the Indian Wars
