= Murray Forsyth =

Professor Murray Forsyth (born 1936 Victoria, Hong Kong) is a British political scientist.

== Biography ==
He was educated at Wellington College. and Balliol College, Oxford. He is an Emeritus Professor of Politics at the University of Leicester.

== Books ==
- Unions of states : the theory and practice of confederation, 1981
- Reason and Revolution: The Political Thought of the Abbe Sieyes, 1987
- The Political Classics: A Guide to the Essential Texts from Plato to Rousseau, 1992
- The Political Classics: Hamilton to Mill, 1993
- The Political Classics: Green to Dworkin, 1996
