= Jimmy Forsyth (photographer) =

British amateur photographer (1913–2009)

- Born: 15 August 1913; Barry, Glamorgan, Wales
- Died: 11 July 2009 (aged 95); Newcastle, Tyne & Wear, England
- Occupation: Photographer

Jimmy Forsyth (15 August 1913 – 11 July 2009) was a British amateur photographer, who in his later life became celebrated for his portrayal of the working class communities of Tyneside and received wide recognition for this achievement prior to his death aged 95. He was equally accomplished in showcasing both the people and the environment of his chosen locality.

== Biography ==
Forsyth was born on 15 August 1913 at 24 Trinity Street Barry, South Wales the son of John and Bertha Forsyth. The family had originally hailed from Garmouth in Morayshire. Forsyth was educated at High Street School Barry.

=== Career ===
He left school at 14 without any formal qualifications and became an apprentice fitter. After completing his apprenticeship in 1934 he found it hard to find regular work. Through 1936–37 he was in the Merchant Navy. During World War Two fitters were valued tradesmen and Forsyth came to Newcastle aged 30 in 1943. He found digs in Elswick off Scotswood Road, near the great Elswick Ordnance Factory. His war work however took him to a new ICI factory a few miles up the Tyne Valley at Prudhoe. The next few years proved complicated. Only a few days into the job at Prudhoe an industrial accident blinded him for life in one eye. He was able to work at the ICI factory until he was dismissed in 1946. His subsequent attempts at gaining paid employment proved frustrating and included a further industrial accident.

==== Photography ====
Forsyth's photographic career started a while before 1954. As an unemployed man he started to photograph the city surrounding him, and when he could, sold the results. That he combined an unusual ability coupled with overcoming financial and physical impairment was remarkable, although recognition of this took time. His presence in the west end of Newcastle also coincided with major social change, as terraced housing and heavy industry gave way to high-rise flats and green space. Although he had no formal training Forsyth developed a systematic approach, indexing his images and carefully identifying their subjects. Recognition started with a first exhibition in 1979 and then the Side Gallery mounting an exhibition in 1981. It accelerated with a combination of a TV documentary and a Bloodaxe Books volume Scotswood Road in 1986. Thereafter an Open University Honorary Degree and two more books prepared in his lifetime followed. As time passed Forsyth worked in both monochrome and colour.

His collection was safeguarded at his death and is now in public ownership in Newcastle. The work towards this end had started with Jimmy's full co-operation and a grant from Northern Arts in the early 1990s. A fourth book of his work An Innocent Eye was published in May 2013. For camera equipment he started with a Coronet Camera Company 127 "box" camera. This was followed with a Rolleiflex bought secondhand for the relatively immense sum of £20.

=== Personal life ===
Forsyth never married. Having moved to Tyneside he lived in a succession of digs and apartments. An early abode he called " a half brothel". From 1952 he was in a Tyneside flat at 353 Scotswood Road and this was home until the bulldozers called in 1963. The conclusion to his life from 1983 was spent in the development known as The Cedars. By the very end his last months were spent in Elswick Hall care home. Forsyth appeared in the 1988 film Stormy Monday which was set in Newcastle.

=== Honours, awards and medals ===
- Halina Award for photography in 1987.
- Open University Honorary Degree as Master of the University (11 May 2002).

== Work ==
=== Photographs ===
- Scotswood Road, Amber Online

=== Exhibitions ===
Exhibitions have been held firstly with Scotswood Road with a Box Camera in January 1979 and then at the Side Gallery Newcastle in 1981. There were other exhibitions in the West End of Newcastle. He participated in the 2001 Gerhard Stromberg curated exhibition The Sleep of Reason.

== Bibliography ==
- Scotswood Road, (with Derek Smith), Bloodaxe Books Ltd, Newcastle, 1986, ISBN 1-85224-014-8.
- Jimmy Forsyth: Photographs from the 1950s and 1960s, edited by Anthony Flowers, Tyne Bridge Publishing, Newcastle, 2009, ISBN 1857951336.

=== Books ===
- Flowers, Anthony; Smith, Derek (2002). Out of One Eye: The Photography of Jimmy Forsyth. Newcastle: Tyne Bridge Publishing. ISBN 1857951565.
- Anthony Flowers An Innocent Eye: Jimmy Forsyth Tyneside Photographer, Tyne Bridge Publishing, Newcastle, 2013,ISBN 9781857952148
