= Jim Forsyth =

Australian rules footballer

Personal information
- Full name: James Forsyth
- Born: 23 July 1944 (age 82)
- Original team: Thorpdale
- Height: 191 cm (6 ft 3 in)
- Weight: 91 kg (201 lb)
- Position: Ruckman

Playing career^{1}
Years	Club	Games (Goals)
1963–1967	Essendon	29 (4)
1968–1970	West Torrens	58
- ^{1} Playing statistics correct to the end of 1970.

James Forsyth (born 23 July 1944) is a former Australian rules footballer who played for Essendon in the Victorian Football League (VFL). He also played with West Torrens in the South Australian National Football League.

Forsyth began his career at Essendon, where he arrived to from Thorpdale. A ruckman, he struggled to get regular games with the strong Essendon side of the 1960s but did take part in their 1966 finals campaign. He went to West Torrens in 1968 and the same year represented South Australia in an interstate match against Western Australia. Forsyth was also a member of the South Australian interstate squad for the 1969 Adelaide Carnival, although he didn't get a game.

He left West Torrens to play for Yarrawonga, in 1971 and 1972. Over the next four seasons, Forsyth captain-coached Drouin, then in 1977 and 1978 he held the same role at Trafalgar.

His son, Tim Forsyth, is a bronze medal-winning Olympic high jumper.
