= USS Forsyth =

Tacoma-class frigate

History

United States
- Name: Forsyth
- Namesake: City of Forsyth, Georgia
- Builder: American Shipbuilding Company, Lorain, Ohio
- Laid down: 6 December 1943
- Launched: 20 May 1944
- Sponsored by: Miss Mary Persons
- Commissioned: 11 February 1945
- Decommissioned: 14 March 1946
- Reclassified: From patrol gunboat, PG-210, to patrol frigate, PF-102, 15 April 1943
- Fate: Transferred to United States Coast Guard, 14 March 1946
- Acquired: Returned by US Coast Guard 2 August 1946
- Fate: Sold to the Netherlands, 1947

United States
- Name: Forsyth
- Acquired: 14 March 1946
- Commissioned: 14 March 1946
- Decommissioned: 2 August 1946
- Fate: Returned to US Navy 2 August 1946

Netherlands
- Name: Cumulus
- Namesake: Cumulus cloud
- Acquired: 1947
- In service: 1947
- Out of service: 1963
- Fate: Scrapped 1969
- Notes: Served Dutch government as civilian weather ship

General characteristics
- Class & type: Tacoma-class frigate
- Displacement: 1,264 long tons (1,284 t)
- Length: 303 ft 11 in (92.63 m)
- Beam: 37 ft 11 in (11.56 m)
- Draft: 13 ft 8 in (4.17 m)
- Propulsion: 2 × 5,500 shp (4,101 kW) turbines; 3 boilers; 2 shafts
- Speed: 20 knots (37 km/h; 23 mph)
- Complement: 190
- Armament: 3 × 3"/50 dual purpose guns (3x1); 4 x 40 mm guns (2×2); 9 × 20 mm guns (9×1); 1 × Hedgehog anti-submarine mortar; 8 × Y-gun depth charge projectors; 2 × Depth charge tracks

USS Forsyth (PF-102) was a United States Navy Tacoma-class frigate in commission from 1945 to 1946, which saw service in the final months of World War II and the first months of the postwar period. After her Navy career concluded, she was in commission in the United States Coast Guard as the cutter USCGC Forsyth (WPF-102) from March to August 1946. In 1947 she was sold to the Government of the Netherlands, for which she served as the civilian weather ship SS Cumulus from 1947 to 1963.

== Construction and commissioning ==
Forsyth originally was authorized as a patrol gunboat with the hull number PG-210, but she was redesignated as a patrol frigate with the hull number PF-102 on 15 April 1943. She was laid down under a Maritime Commission contract as a Maritime Commission Type T. S2-S2-AQ1 Hull by the American Shipbuilding Company at Lorain, Ohio on 6 December 1943. She was launched on 20 May 1944, sponsored by Miss Mary Parsons, and was commissioned on 11 February 1945 with a United States Coast Guard crew.

== U.S. Navy service ==
=== World War II, 1945 ===
After shakedown training in the Caribbean, Forsyth steamed north to Naval Station Argentia, Newfoundland, the base for her future operations as a weather ship. She departed Argentia on 2 April 1945 on her first weather patrol, reporting meteorological data, and maintaining readiness to aid any ship or aircraft in distress.

On 12 May 1945, Forsyth was called off her weather reporting station to search through haze and fog for the German submarine U-234, which wanted to surrender in the immediate aftermath of the surrender of Germany at the end of World War II in Europe. On 15 May 1945, Forsyth joined destroyer escort USS Sutton (DE-771) in accepting the surrender of U-234 in the Atlantic Ocean at 46°39′00″N 045°39′00″W. U-234 was carrying a German technical mission to Tokyo, Japan, which was still at war with the Allies, where the Germans expected to help the Japanese. Two Japanese officer passengers on board U-234 had previously committed suicide rather than surrender. Later on the day of the capture of U-234, Forsyth's medical officer, joined by the doctor from U-234, operated on board Forsyth on one of Sutton's men who had been wounded accidentally while collecting small arms on board the submarine. Forsyth carried the injured sailor into Argentia, arriving there on 18 May 1945. Despite the prompt treatment of the wound, internal hemorrhaging proved too severe, and the injured sailor died on 25 May 1945.

=== Postwar ===
Forsyth continued her weather reporting duty in the North Atlantic Ocean for five more months. She then steamed south to Recife, Brazil, where she moored on 1 December 1945. Until 1 March 1946, she operated out of Recife on weather station duty.

On 8 March 1946, Forsyth departed Recife for Trinidad. At midnight on 14 March 1946, while at sea, she was decommissioned as a ship of the U.S. Navy

== U.S. Coast Guard service ==
Immediately upon decommissioning at sea, Forsyth was commissioned into the United States Coast Guard as the cutter USCGC Forsyth (WPF-102). She steamed from Trinidad to Boston, Massachusetts, arriving there on 23 March 1945, and made one more North Atlantic patrol on ocean weather station duty. She then proceeded to New Orleans, Louisiana, where the Coast Guard decommissioned her on 2 August 1946 and transferred her back to the U.S. Navy.

== Disposal ==
The U.S. Navy transferred Forsyth to the Maritime Commission for disposal. The Maritime Commission sold her to the Netherlands in 1947.

== Service as Dutch weather ship ==
In the Netherlands, the ship entered service in 1947 as the civilian weather ship SS Cumulus, performing weather-reporting duties for the Dutch government until 1963.

Cumulus was scrapped in 1969.
