= Château de Maintenon =

Historical monument in France

- Maintenon, Eure-et-Loir, France
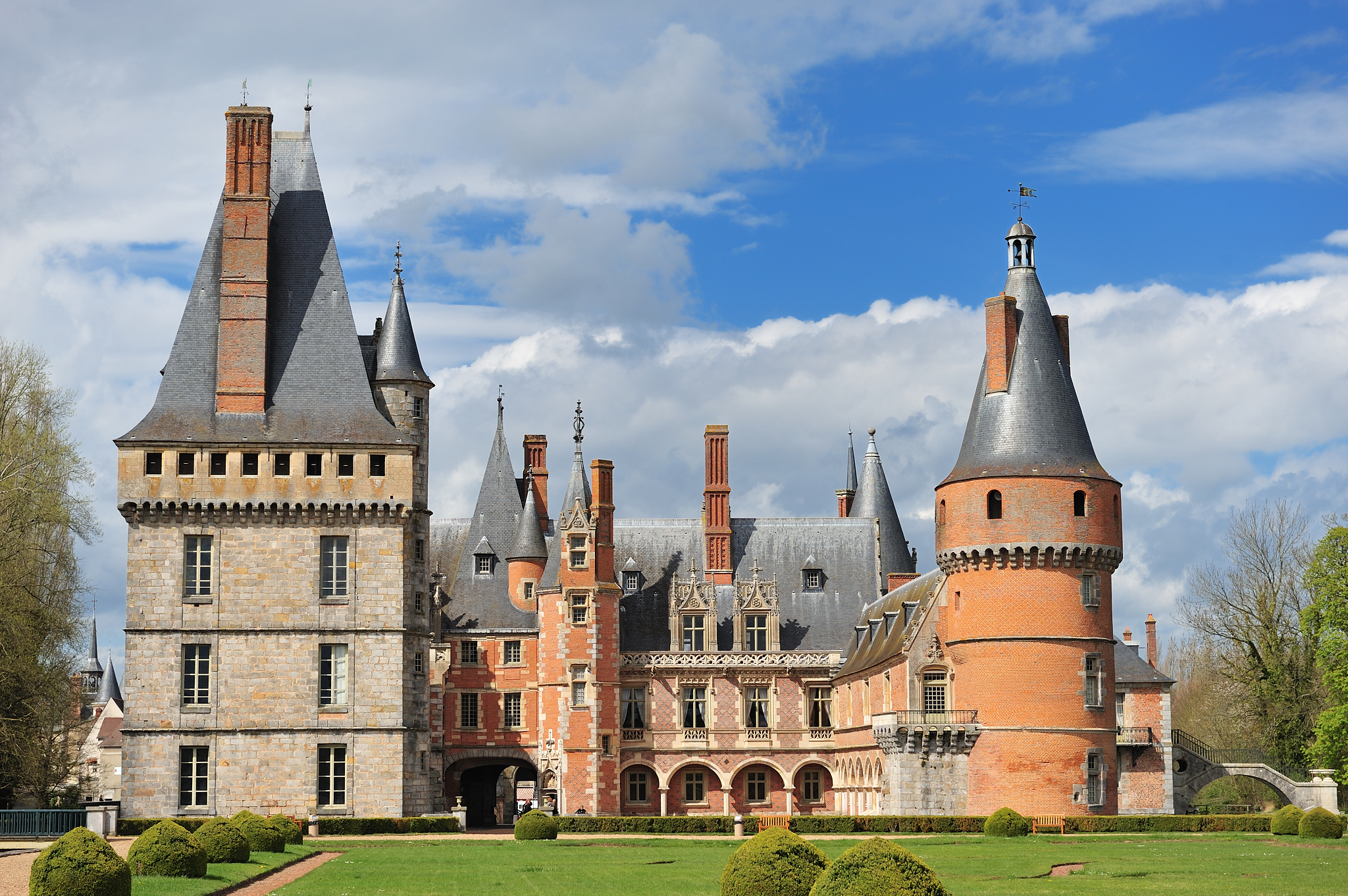

Site information
- Type: château
- Website: http://www.chateaudemaintenon.fr/

Location
- Coordinates: 48°35′8″N 1°34′42″E

Site history
- Architect: André Le Nôtre
- Designations: monument historique

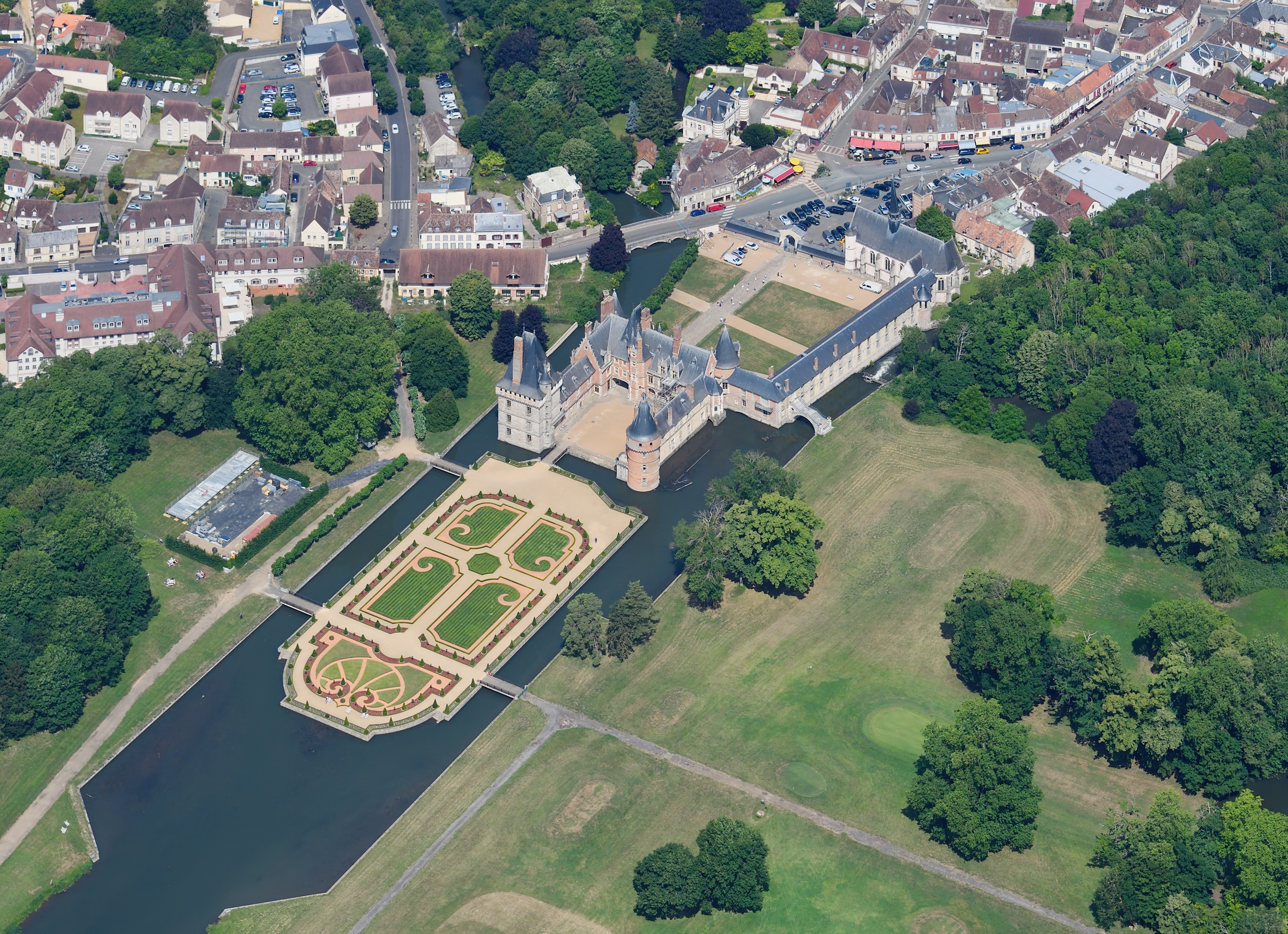
Aerial view of Château de Maintenon and its garden

The Château de Maintenon (French pronunciation: [ʃato də mɛ̃tnɔ̃]) is a château, developed from the original castle, situated in the commune of Maintenon in the Eure-et-Loir département of France. It is best known as being the private residence of Madame de Maintenon, the second spouse of Louis XIV.

The castle has been designated as a protected historical monument since 1944 by the French Ministry of Culture.

== Description ==
=== Construction ===
The construction of the castle began in the 13th and ended in roughly the 18th century. In the early 16th century, it was purchased by Louis XII's treasurer Jean Cottereau, who transformed the castle into a country house. In the 17th century, it was rebuilt for Madame de Maintenon, who purchased the estate in 1674.

The château's main features are the keep, constructed in the 13th century, and the principal corps de logis, flanked by three round towers, one at the avant-cour and the others at the bridge across the moat. The east and west wings frame a cour d'honneur, beyond which is the moat filled by the waters of the Eure, and, beyond, the parterre and park. The picturesque massing of the varied towers and roofs pleased François-René de Chateaubriand who found its special character was like that of an abbey or an old town, "with its spires and steeples, grouped at haphazard".

At the far end of the gardens is the aqueduct, crossing the Canal de l'Eure, also known as the canal de Louis XIV, ordered by Louis XIV. Its colossal scale impressed Chateaubriand, who said that it was "a work worthy of the Caesars". It was constructed by the Marquis de Vauban between 1685 and 1690 in order to transport water from the Eure River to the gardens and fountains at the Château de Versailles.

In the 17th century, there was an orangery constructed as well as stables.

=== Interior ===
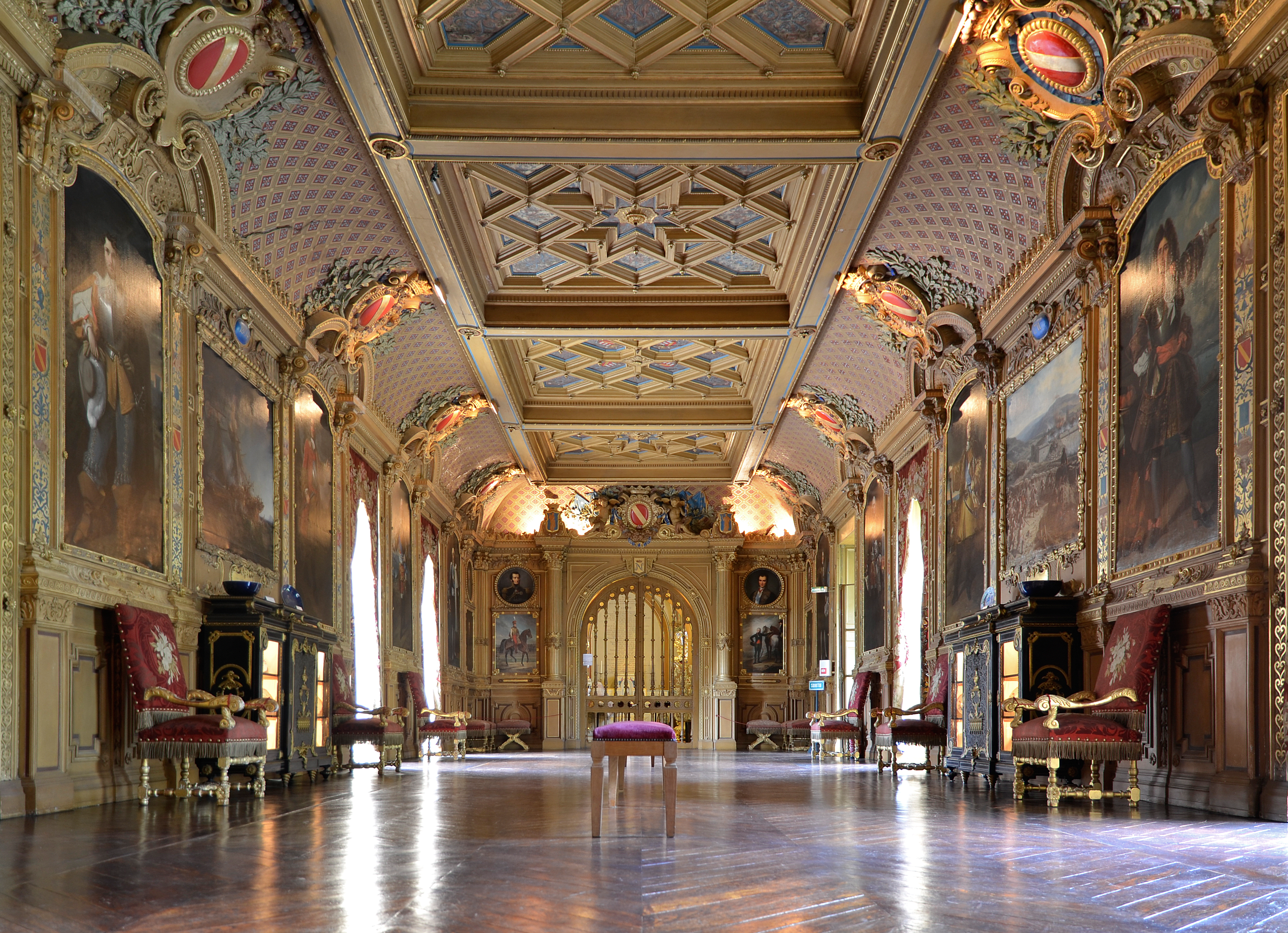
The grande galerie

The interior has been restored, and furniture and decoration can be seen.

- The petits appartements (situated on the first floor of the corps de logis) include:
  - a passage leading to the bedroom of Madame de Maintenon, an antechamber, and a private oratory
  - the bedroom of the maréchal de Noailles, also preceded by an antechamber.
- The grands appartements (part of the round tower) include:
  - two salons decorated in the Chinese style
  - the salon du Roi, Louis XIV's bedroom when he stayed at Maintenon as guest of his secret wife
  - a 19th-century billiard room
  - a library in the style Napoléon III, the old library of Madame de Maintenon;
  - a portrait gallery showing painting of the House of Noailles, who inherited the property at the death of Madame de Maintenon in 1718; in the gallery there is a cenotaph in her honour.

The other towers are not open to visitors.

=== Gardens and aqueduct ===
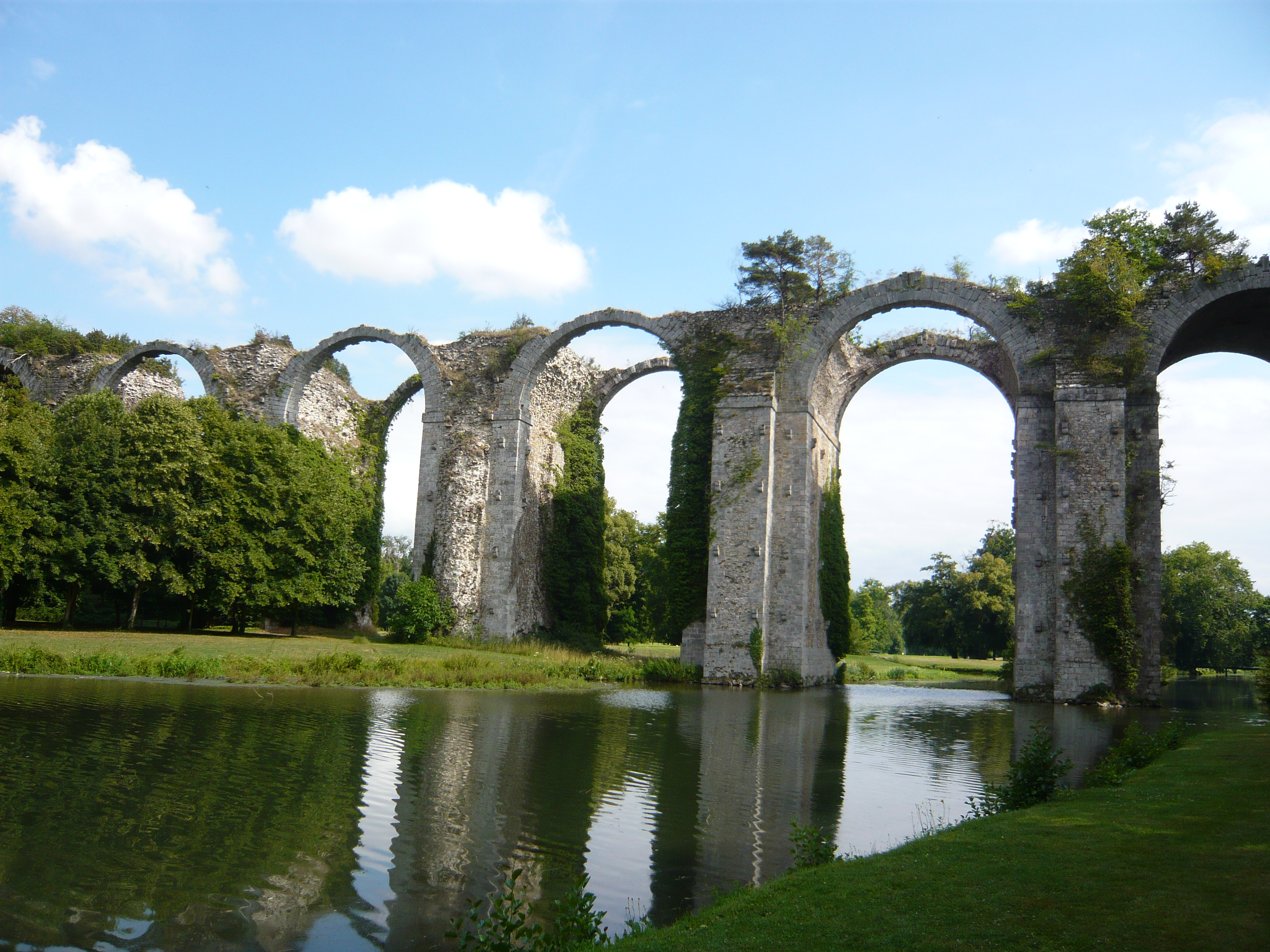
The aqueduct

The main parterre was designed by the famous landscape architect André Le Nôtre who also worked at Versailles, Saint-Germain-en-Laye and Marly. For many years, the parterre had two interlacing "L"'s, in honour of Louis XIV. In 2013, to commemorate the 400th anniversary of André Le Nôtre, the garden was reconstructed in its initial form of a "French formal garden". Two allées, given modern names in honour of Le Nôtre and Racine, border the Eure River.

At the far end, cutting through the gardens, is the aqueduct built from 1685 to supply the fountains of the park of the Palace of Versailles. The project meant that water was diverted from the Eure River some 80 kilometres (50 mi) away. The arches of the structure reach a height of 60 feet. Vauban was in charge of the works.

The aqueduct had to have 47 arcades to the first row, 195 arcades to the second and 390 to the third one. The wars of Louis XIV prevented the work's completion.

It has also been classified as a Monument historique since 1875 by the French Ministry of Culture.

== History ==
=== Succession of owners and inhabitants ===
Famille de Maintenon

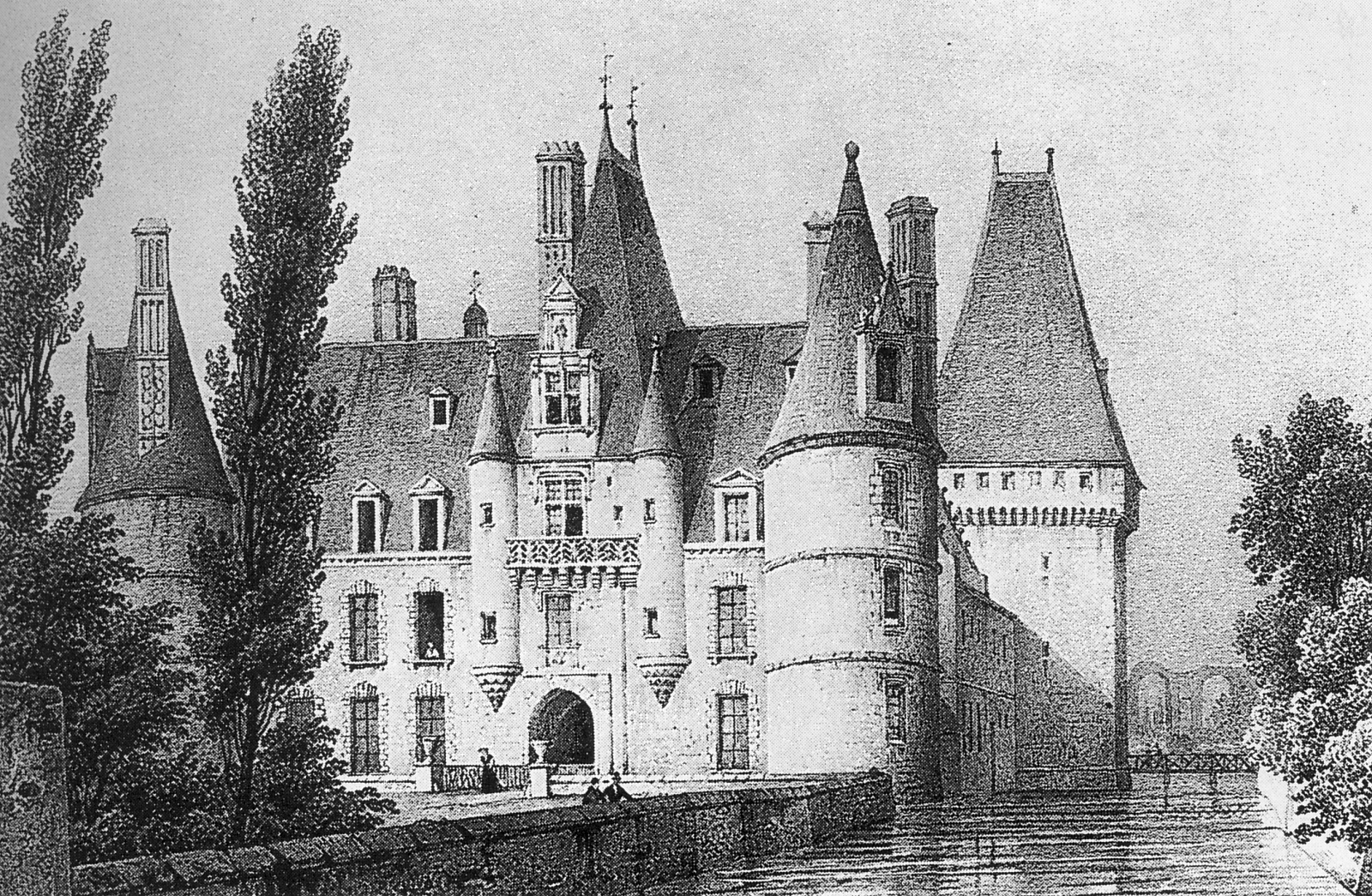
Lithograph of the 19th century by Bichebois

- End of the 10th century : Avesgaud I; first Lord of Maintenon (seigneur de Maintenon);
- From 1028: Germond I, son of the above;
- Cited from 1053: Avesgaud II, son of the above;
- Cited from 1083: Germond II, son of the above;
- Cited from 1086 to 1120: Mainier, son of the above;
- Cited from 1123 to 1135 : Amaury I, son of the above;
- Around 1150: Guillaume, son of the above;
- Around 1180: Jean, son of the above;
- From 1200 à 1237: Amaury II, son of the above;
- Around 1240: Amaury III, son of the above;
- 1248: Hugues, son of the above;
- Around 1260: Jean, brother of the above;
- 13th century : Amaury IV, son or nephew of the above;
- Beginning of the 13th century : X (died before 1331), son of the above;
- Circa 1346 to 1373 : Amaury V, son of the above;
- End of the 13th century : Thibaud, son of the above;
- Around 1473: Jean, son of the above;
- Around 1485: Robert, son of the above;
- At the end 1497: Amaury Loresse, écuyer

Cottereau Family

- At the end of 1503, Jean Cottereau;

Angennes Family

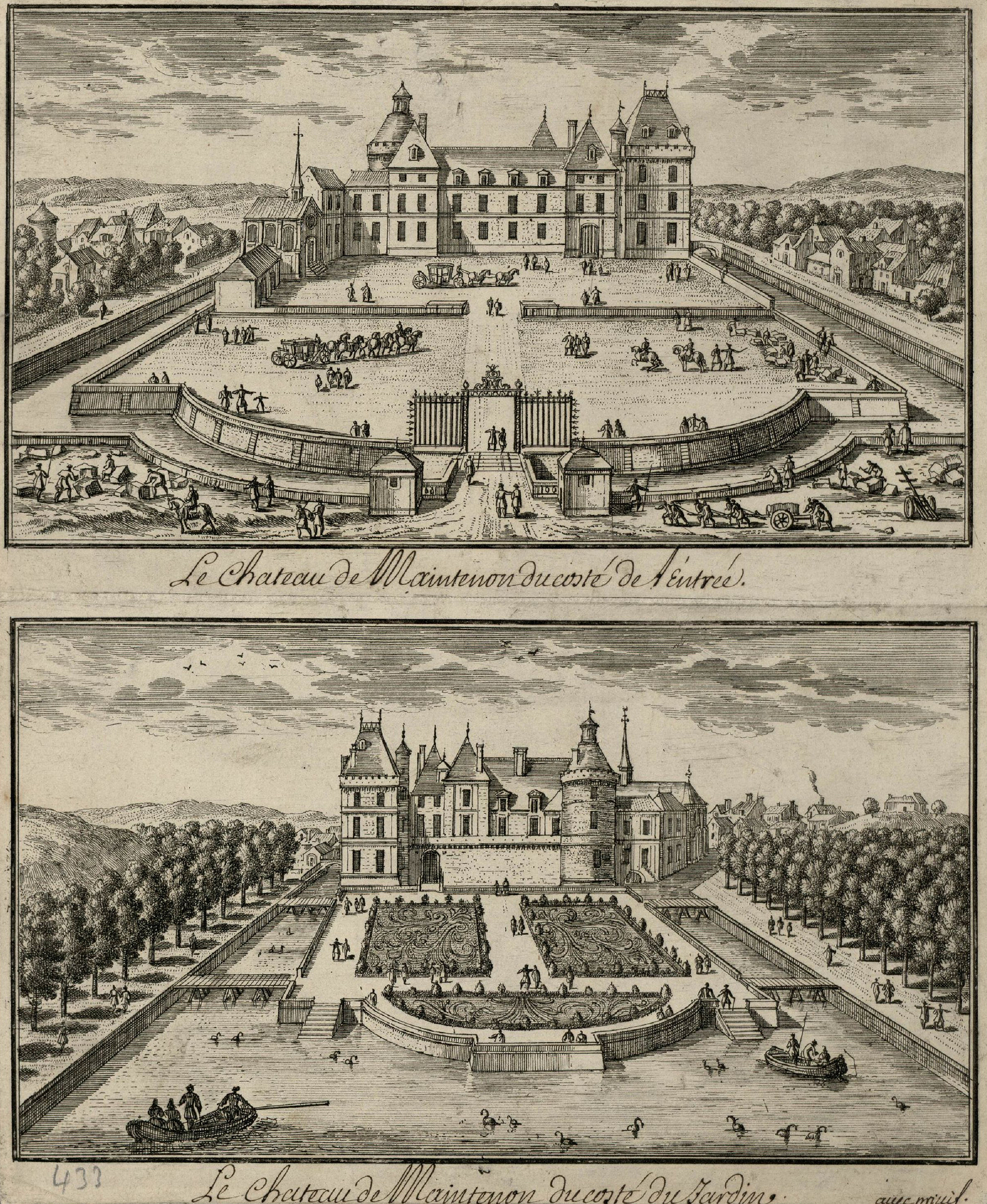
The château as it was when Madame de Montespan stayed here

- 1526: Jacques d’Angennes ( – 1562), seigneur de Rambouillet, married Isabeau ( – 1554), daughter of the above;
- Before 1573: Louis d’Angennes (1536 – after 1601), First marquis de Maintenon, baron de Meslay, seigneur de La Moutonnière, Moutier and of La Villeneuve, son of the previous, married Françoise d'O;
- 1607: Charles, marquis de Maintenon, baron de Meslay, seigneur de La Moutonnière, du Moutier et de La Villeneuve, son of the previous, married Françoise, Lady of Blainville, Salvert and of Saint-Gervais;
- 1640: Louis, marquis de Maintenon, baron then marquis de Meslay, seigneur de La Moutonnière, of Moutier, and La Villeneuve, de Blainville and of Saint-Gervais, son of the above, married Marie Le Clerc du Tremblay;
- Second part of the 17th century : Charles François (1648–1691), marquis de Maintenon, épouse Catherine du Poyet de Poincy.

Famille d'Aubigné

- 1674: Madame de Maintenon (1635–1719) bought the marquisate from the previous;
  - 1677: Madame de Montespan gave birth to her youngest daughter, future Duchess of Orléans;
  - 1689 and 1691: Racine wrote the tragedies Esther and Athalie for the Maison royale de Saint-Louis;

House of Noailles

- 1698: Françoise Charlotte d'Aubigné (1684–1739), niece of Madame de Maintenon, wife of Adrien Maurice de Noailles (1678–1766); Madame de Maintenon willed it to her niece;
- 1766: Louis de Noailles (1713–1793), son and heir of the above, he married in 1737 to Catherine de Cossé-Brissac.
- 1793: Jean de Noailles (1739–1824), son of the above; he married in 1755 to Louise d'Aguesseau;
- 1824: Paul de Noailles (1802–1885), great-nephew of the above; he married Alice de Rochechouart de Mortemart
- 1885: Jules Charles Victurnien de Noailles, duc de Noailles (1826–1895), son of the above; married in 1851 Clotilde de La Ferté-Meun;
- 1895: Adrien de Noailles, duc de Noailles (1869–1953), son of the above; married in 1892 Yolande de Luynes;
  - Jean Maurice Paul Jules de Noailles, duc d’Ayen (1893–1945), their son, died in action; he had married in 1919 Solange de Labriffe;
- 1953 : Geneviève de Noailles (1921–1998), daughter of Jean, heiress of the château; she married in 1947 Jean Gaston Amaury Raindre.

Fondation du château de Maintenon

- 1983 : Geneviève and Jean Raindre create the Mansart Foundation and bequeath the property to this foundation.
- 2005 : The foundation transfers the management to the Conseil général d'Eure-et-Loir.

== See also ==
- List of châteaux in Eure-et-Loir
- List of castles in France
