= Emmanuel Marie de Noailles, Marquis of Noailles =

French diplomat (1743–1822)

Emmanuel Marie de Noailles
- Marquis of Noailles
- Full name: Emmanuel Marie de Noailles
- Born: 12 December 1743; Paris, France
- Died: September 1822 (aged 78); Maintenon, France
- Spouse: Charlotte Françoise de Hallencourt de Dromesnil
- Issue: Louis Jules César de Noailles; Achille Charles Victor de Noailles
- Father: Louis de Noailles, 4th Duke of Noailles
- Mother: Catherine de Cossé

Emmanuel Marie Louis de Noailles, Marquis of Noailles (12 December 1743 – September 1822) was a French diplomat.

== Early life ==
Noailles was born in Paris on 12 December 1743. He was the second son of Louis de Noailles, 4th Duke of Noailles and Catherine Françoise Charlotte de Cossé-Brissac. His siblings included Jean de Noailles, 5th Duke of Noailles, Adrienne Catherine de Noailles (who married René de Froulay, Count of Tessé, Marquis de Lavardin, a grandson of René de Froulay de Tessé), and Philippine Louise de Noailles.

His paternal grandparents were Adrien Maurice de Noailles, 3rd Duke of Noailles and Françoise Charlotte d'Aubigné. His maternal grandparents were Charles Timoléon Louis de Cossé, 6th Duke of Brissac and Catherine Madeleine Pecoil.

== Career ==
He served as ambassador to Hamburg from 1768 to 1770, to Amsterdam from 1770 to 1776, to London 1776–1783, and to Vienna 1783–1792. Lafayette visited him, in 1776, before embarking for America, as he promised. In Vienna, he also knew Gluck and Mozart.

== Personal life ==
Noailles was married to Charlotte Françoise de Hallencourt de Dromesnil (1745–1806), daughter of the Marquis de Dromesnil. Together, they were the parents of:

- Louis Jules César de Noailles, Marquis de Noailles (b. 1773), who married Pauline Laurette Le Couteulx du Molay, a daughter of Jacques Jean Le Couteulx, Seigneur du Molay.
- Achille Charles Victor de Noailles (1779–1837), who married Rose de Suc de Saint-Affrique.

Noailles died in September 1822. As his elder brother, the 5th Duke, died without male issue in 1824, the dukedom passed to Emmanuel's grandson, 22 year-old Paul de Noailles, who became the 6th Duke of Noailles.

== See also ==
- List of Ambassadors of France to the United Kingdom
