= List of dukes in Europe =

The following is a list of historic dukedoms in Europe:

== Austria ==
The Austrian lands:

- the Duchies of Austria proper
- the Duchy of Carinthia (today in Austria, Italy and Slovenia)
- the Duchy of Styria (today in Austria and Slovenia)
- the Duchy of Carniola (today Slovenia).

The Habsburg dukes came to style themselves Archdukes.

Arms	Title	Date of creation	Creating sovereign	Current holder	Notes
	Duchess of Hohenberg	4 October 1909	Franz Josef I of Austria		created for Sophie, Princess of Hohenberg (for life, extinct in 1914)
	Duke of Hohenberg	31 August 1917	Karl I of Austria	Nikolaus, Duke of Hohenberg	created for Prince Max of Hohenberg (hereditary in the primogeniture)

== Bohemia ==
The Czech lands:

- the Duchy of Bohemia
- the Duchies of Silesia

The Duchy of Bohemia became Kingdom of Bohemia in 1212.

== France ==
=== Non-royal dukes ===
Arms	Title	Date of creation	Creating sovereign	Current holder	Notes
	Dukes of Uzès	February 1572	Charles IX	Jacques de Crussol d'Uzès	
	Duchy of Montbazon	May 1588	Henry III	Albert Marie de Rohan-Rochefort	
	Duke of Rohan	7 August 1603	Henry IV	Josselin de Rohan	
	Duke of Brissac	13 April 1611	Louis XIII	Charles-André de Cossé-Brissac, 14th Duke of Brissac	
	Duke of Luynes	22 August 1619	Louis XIII	Philippe d'Albert, 13th duc de Luynes	
	Duke of Chevreuse; Duke of Chaulnes	1545; 1621	Francis I Louis XIII	Jacques François Marie Raymond d'Albert de Luynes, 13th duc de Chaulnes	
	Duke of La Force	3 August 1637	Louis XIII	Henri Jacques Nompar de Caumont La Force	
	Duke of Estrées	1663	Louis XIV	Armand-Sosthènes de La Rochefoucauld-Doudeauville	
	Duke of Noailles; Dukes of Ayen	1663; 1737	Louis XIV; Louis XV	Hélie Marie Auguste Jacques Bertrand Philippe de Noailles, 10th Duke of Noailles	
	Duke of Broglie	11 June 1742	Louis XV	Philippe-Maurice, 9th duc de Broglie	
	Duke of Montebello	19 March 1808	Napoleon I	Maurice Georges Antoine Marie Lannes, 7th Duke of Montebello	
	Dukes of Magenta	5 June 1859	Napoleon III	Maurice Marie Patrick Bacchus Humphrey de MacMahon, 5th Duc de Magenta	

== Germany ==
Although the titled aristocracy of Germany no longer holds a legal rank, nearly all ducal families in Germany continued to be treated as dynastic (i.e., "royalty") for marital and genealogical purposes after 1918. Some maintain dynastic traditions that are reflected in roles they still play in high society networks, philanthropy and Germany's version of local "squirearchy" visibility.

At first, the highest nobles – de facto equal to kings and emperors – were the Dukes of the stem duchies:

- Duchy of Saxony (now Lower Saxony)
- Duchy of Franconia
- Duchy of Bavaria
- Duchy of Swabia
- Duchy of Lorraine (replacing Duchy of Thuringia)

Later, the precedence shifted to the prince-electors, the first order amongst the princes of the empire, regardless of the actual title attached to the fief. This college originally included only one Duke, the Duke of Saxony. The ducal title, however, was not limited by primogeniture in the post-medieval era. All descendants in the male line, including females, shared the original title, but each male added as a suffix the name of his inherited domain to distinguish his line from that of other branches. From the 19th century, some cadets of the kingly houses of Bavaria and Württemberg, and all those of the grand-ducal houses of Mecklenburg-Schwerin, Mecklenburg-Strelitz and Oldenburg, took the ducal prefix as their primary style instead of that of Prince (Prinz).

There were many other duchies, some of them insignificant petty states (Kleinstaaterei):

- Duchy of Arenberg, an imperial estate (county) from 1549, raised to princely county in 1576 and duchy in 1644
- Duchy of Bavaria, elector since 1623
- Duchy of Bremen (1648–1806)
- Duchy of Brunswick-Lüneburg, divided into various lines, one of which became the electorate of Hanover in 1692, another became the independent Duchy of Brunswick in 1815.
- Duchy of Franconia, the secular title of the Bishop of Würzburg
- Duchy of Holstein, in union with Schleswig, in personal union with the Danish crown.
- Duchy of Jülich and Berg
- Duchy of Lorraine
- Duchy of Magdeburg, the former prince-archbishopric after being acquired by Brandenburg-Prussia in 1680
- Duchy of Mecklenburg, later divided into various lines
- Duchy of Pomerania
- Grand Duchy of Salzburg, the secularized prince-archbishopric 1803–1806
- Duchies of Saxony, in Lower Saxony and Upper Saxony, the successor state(s) of the original (stem)duchy of Saxony after dismissal of Duke Henry the Lion by the Emperor, collateral lines of the electoral line (to wit: the Lower Saxon Saxe-Lauenburg and the Upper Saxon Saxe-Altenburg, Saxe-Coburg and Gotha, Saxe-Eisenach, Saxe-Eisenberg, Saxe-Gotha, Saxe-Hildburghausen, Saxe-Jena, Saxe-Meiningen, Saxe-Römhild, Saxe-Saalfeld, Saxe-Weimar, Saxe-Weimar-Eisenach, Saxe-Weissenfels, and Saxe-Wittenberg)
- Duchy of Silesia
- Duchy of Westphalia, a territory under the Archbishop of Cologne, either a successor-state of the original Duchy of Saxony, which was divided into Eastphalia (which later became Brunswick-Lüneburg), Engern and Westphalia
- Duchy of Württemberg, became an electorate in 1803
- Duchy of Zweibrücken

=== Ruling Dukes (as of 1918) ===
Arms	Title	Date of creation	Ducal House	Current pretender	Notes
	Duke of Saxe-Meiningen	30 August 1680	House of Wettin	Konrad, Prince of Saxe-Meiningen	
	Duke of Brunswick	22 December 1813	House of Hanover	Prince Ernst August of Hanover	
	Duke of Saxe-Altenburg	12 November 1826	House of Wettin	none	extinct in 1991
	Duke of Saxe-Coburg and Gotha	12 November 1826	House of Wettin	Hubertus Prinz von Sachsen-Coburg und Gotha	
	Duke of Anhalt	30 August 1863	House of Ascania	Eduard, Prince of Anhalt	

=== Non-ruling Dukes ===
Arms	Title	Date of creation	Ducal House	Current holder	Notes
	Duke of Leuchtenberg	14 November 1817	House of Beauharnais	none	extinct in 1974
	Duke of Schleswig-Holstein-Sonderburg-Glücksburg	6 July 1825	House of Glücksburg	Friedrich Ferdinand, Prince of Schleswig-Holstein	
	Duke of Ratibor	15 October 1840	House of Hohenlohe-Schillingsfürst	Viktor Metternich-Sándor, 5th Duke of Ratibor and Prince of Corvey	
	Duke of Ujest	18 October 1861	House of Hohenlohe-Oehringen	Kraft, 5th Duke of Ujest and Prince of Hohenlohe-Oehringen	
	Duke of Urach	28 March 1867	House of Urach	Wilhelm Albert, 5th Duke of Urach	
	Duke of Wörth-Donaustauf	8 May 1899	House of Thurn and Taxis	Albert, 5th Duke of Wörth-Donaustauf and Prince Thurn and Taxis	
	Duke of Trachenberg	1 January 1900	House of Hatzfeldt-Trachenberg	Sebastian, 4th Duke of Trachenberg and Prince of Hatzfeldt	
	Duke of Pless	20 December 1905	House of Hochberg	Peter von Hochberg-Pless	

=== On the Baltic south coast ===
- The duchy of Pomerellen (Pomerelia; capital Danzig (Gdańsk), now in Poland) was part of the State of the Teutonic Order until its takeover by the Polish Crown in 1466.
- The duchy of Courland (now in Latvia) was a Polish vassal state and once a colonial power from its foundation in 1562 for the last Master of Livonian Order, Gotthard Kettler, until 1795.
- The Ordensstaat became the Duchy of Prussia in 1525, part of the dynastic home country of the later German (Hohenzollern) Emperor.

== The Low countries (Netherlands/Belgium/Luxembourg) ==
- Duchy of Brabant
- Duchy of Guelders
- Duchy of Bouillon in the Ardenne
- Duchy of Luxembourg

Arms	Title	Date of creation	Ducal House	Current holder	Notes
	Duke of Brabant	1183	Belgian Royal Family (Crown Prince(ss) of Belgium)	Princess Elisabeth, Duchess of Brabant	
	Duke of Arenberg; Duke of Aarschot	6 June 1644; 1 April 1533	House of Arenberg	Léopold, 13th Duke of Arenberg	
	Duke of Beaufort-Spontin	2 December 1782	Beaufort-Spontin	Friedrich Christian, 7th Duke of Beaufort-Spontin	
	Duke of Croÿ	18 July 1598	House of Croÿ	Rudolf, 15th Duke of Croÿ	
	Duke of Looz-Corswarem	24 December 1734	Looz-Corswarem	Thierry, 11th Duke of Looz-Corswarem	
	Duke of Ursel	19 August 1716	House of Ursel	Stéphane, 10th Duke d'Ursel	

== Greece ==
Arms	Title	Date of creation	Ducal House	Current pretender	Notes
	Duke of Sparta	29 September 1868	Greek Royal Family (Constantine I of Greece)	none	

== Italy ==
=== Kingdom of the Lombards ===
The Kingdom of the Lombards was divided in several duchies, as follows:

- Duchy of Friuli
- Duchy of Ceneda
- Duchy of Treviso
- Duchy of Vicenza
- Duchy of Verona
- Duchy of Trent
- Duchy of Parma
- Duchy of Reggio
- Duchy of Piacenza
- Duchy of Brescia
- Duchy of Bergamo
- Duchy of Milan
- Duchy of Pavia
- Duchy of San Giulio
- Duchy of Asti
- Duchy of Turin
- Duchy of Ivrea
- Duchy of Aosta
- Duchy of Tuscany
- Duchy of Spoleto
- Duchy of Benevento (787–873 under Frankish suzerainty, then again Byzantine; later a principality, since 1051 held from the Pope)

They have been suppressed or transformed in counties as consequence of the Frankish conquest of the Kingdom in 776. Only the two southern duchies of Spoleto and Benevento were spared and survived some centuries.

=== Exarchate of Ravenna ===
In the same period (the Early Middle Ages) also many Italian territories under Byzantine suzerainty (in the Exarchate of Ravenna) were organized in duchies, and notably the following ones:

- Duchy of Amalfi
- Duchy of Sorrento
- Duchy of Naples
- Duchy of Gaeta
- Duchy of Rome
- Duchy of Venice

The first four were Tyrrhenian port cities and survived as semi-autonomous states until the Norman conquest of Southern Italy in the 11th and 12th centuries. The Duchy of Rome was transformed in the Papal State as consequence of the Donation of Sutri in 728. The Duchy of Venice became the Republic of Venice and its head of state retained the title of doge, equivalent to that of duke.

In 1059 Robert Guiscard, head of the Norman House of Hauteville, was created by the Pope Duke of Apulia and Calabria. When the State was raised to Kingdom of Sicily in 1180, the title of Duke of Apulia and Calabria was used intermittently for the heir to throne.

=== Kingdom of Italy (medieval) ===
Since 1395 the major Signorias of the Kingdom of Italy (which was part of the Holy Roman Empire) began to be raised to Dukedoms by the Emperor. By the centuries more and more Dukedoms were created in this way and they became de facto sovereign states. The Duchies created after 1395 were the following ones:

- Duchy of Milan
- Duchy of Mantua
- Duchy of Sabbioneta
- Duchy of Montferrat
- Duchy of Guastalla
- Duchy of Modena and Reggio
- Duchy of Mirandola
- Duchy of Massa and Carrara

The Duchy of Savoy, though it was not an Italian state, had suzerainty on Piedmont.

=== Papal States ===
Also the Pope created some sovereign duchy during the Renaissance, notably:

- Duchy of Ferrara
- Duchy of Urbino
- Duchy of Camerino
- Duchy of Castro
- Duchy of Parma

=== Kingdom of Naples ===
In the Kingdom of Naples, the Duchy of Sora was a semi-autonomous fiefdom.

See also Historical states of Italy

In the Papal states and in the Kingdoms of Naples and Sicily the Pope and the king, respectively, granted the title of duke as the second rank of nobility, just inferior to that of prince. These dukes, however, always remained vassals.
They include:

- Duchy of Acerenza, created by the Kings of Spain and Naples for the ancestors of the Prince Belmonte
- Duchy of San Donato, created by the Kings of Spain and Naples for the ancestors of the Prince Sanseverino
- Duke of Calabria was the primogeniture for the crown prince of the Neapolitan kingdom.

Since 1081 the Duchies of Benevento and Pontecorvo had been two among the Papal states, and, in fact, no duke was appointed.

=== Kingdom of Italy (Napoleonic) ===
A unique Napoleonic particularity was the creation by decree of 30 March 1806 of a number of duchés grand-fiefs. As the name suggests, these were duchies, but forming an exclusive order of 'great fiefs' (twenty among some 2200 noble title creations), a college nearly comparable in status to the original anciennes pairies in the French kingdom. Since Napoleon would not go back on the Revolution's policy of abolishing feudalism in France, but did not want these grandees to fall under the 'majorat' system in France either, he chose to create them outside the French "metropolitan" empire, notably in the following Italian satellite states, and yet all awarded to loyal Frenchmen, mainly high military officers:

In the Kingdom of Italy, in personal union with France, personally held by Napoleon I:

- Dalmatia (now in Croatia): for maréchal Nicolas Jean de Dieu Soult (1808, extinguished 1857)
- Istria (now in Croatia): for maréchal Jean-Baptiste Bessières (1809, ext. 1856)
- Frioul, i.e. Friuli: for the widow of general Geraud Christophe Michel Duroc (1813, ext. 1829)
- Cadore: for Admiral Jean-Baptiste Nompère de Champagny (ext. 1893)
- Bellune, i.e. Belluno: for maréchal Victor (1808, ext. 1853)
- Conegliano: for maréchal Bon Adrien Jeannot de Moncey (1808, ext. 1842)
- Trévise, i.e. Treviso: for maréchal Édouard Adolphe Casimir Joseph Mortier (1808, ext. 1912)
- Feltre: for general Clarke (ext. 1852, extended 1864)
- Bassano: for Hugues-Bernard Maret, minister (ext. 1906)
- Vicence, i.e. Vicenza: for general Armand Augustin Louis de Caulaincourt, also imperial Grand-Écuyer (ext. 1896)
- Padoue, i.e. Padua (Padova in Italian): for general Jean-Toussaint Arrighi de Casanova (24 April 1808, ext. 1888)
- Rovigo: for general Anne Jean Marie René Savary (extinguished in 1872)

In the Principality of Lucca and Piombino, only Massa et Carrara: for Régnier, judge (extinguished 1962); Massa and Carrara were separated from the kingdom of Italy by article 8 of the decree of March 30, 1806 and united to the principality of Lucca-Piombino by another decree of March 30, 1806.

In the Kingdom of Naples :

- Gaete, i.e. Gaeta: for Martin-Michel-Charles Gaudin, finance minister (1809, extinguished 1841)
- Otrante, i.e. Otranto: for Joseph Fouché, minister of Police (1809)
- Reggio: for maréchal Charles Nicolas Oudinot (1810, main line extinguished 1956, but special clause of the letters patent authorizing a substitution were applied)
- Tarente, i.e. Tarento: for maréchal Étienne MacDonald (1809, extinguished 1912)

In the states of Parma and Piacenza, ceded to France by the treaty of Aranjuez of 21 March 1801, shortly before both territories were united to the French Empire on 24 May 1808:

- Parme, i.e. Parma: for lawyer Jean Jacques Régis de Cambacérès, author of the Code (the main European revision since Roman law, still influential in most democratic societies), Arch-Chancellor (24 April 1808, extinguished 1824)
- Plaisance, i.e. Piacenza: for Charles-François Lebrun, also imperial Arch-Treasurer (24 April 1808, extinguished 1926)
- Guastalla: for Camillo Borghese, brother-in-law to Napoleon I (30 March 1806, extinguished 1832)

In 1815 the Congress of Vienna created the last Italian sovereign duchy, the Duchy of Lucca.

== Sweden (Non-royal) ==
Arms	Title	Date of creation	Ducal House	Current holder	Notes
	Duke of Otranto	15 August 1809	Fouché	Charles-Louis Armand Fouché d'Otrante, 8th Duke of Otrante	Napoleonic nobility, Swedish unintroduced nobility
