= Catherine de Cossé =

French noblewoman (1724–1794)

- Duchess of Noailles
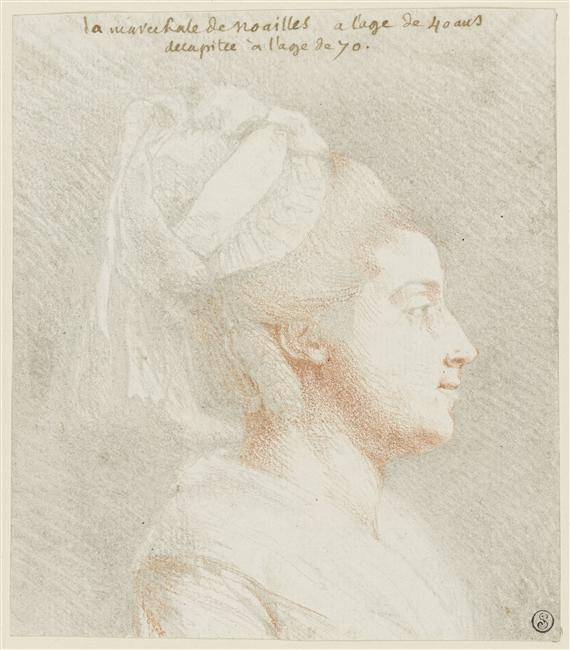
- Full name: Catherine Françoise Charlotte de Cossé
- Born: 13 January 1724; Paris, France
- Died: 22 July 1794 (aged 70); Paris, France
- Spouse: Louis de Noailles (m. 1737; died 1793)
- Issue: Jean, Duke of Noailles; Adrienne Catherine, Countess of Tessé; Emmanuel Marie Louis, Marqius of Noailles; Philippine Louise, Duchess of Lesparre
- Father: Charles Timoléon Louis de Cossé, 6th Duke of Brissac

Catherine de Cossé (Catherine Françoise Charlotte; 13 January 1724 – 22 July 1794) was a French noblewoman, arrested during the French Revolution, charged with treason, and executed by guillotine in Paris. She was the paternal grandmother of Marie Adrienne de Noailles, Marquise de La Fayette

== Marriage ==
On 25 February 1737, she married Louis de Noailles, then styled the Duke of Ayen (duc d'Ayen) as heir to the more senior Dukedom of Noailles.

== Children ==
1. Jean de Noailles, 5th Duke of Noailles (26 October 1739 – 20 October 1824)
2. Adrienne Catherine de Noailles (24 December 1741 – December 1813) married René de Froulay, Count of Tessé and last Marquis of Lavardin
3. Emmanuel Marie de Noailles, Marquis of Noailles (12 December 1743 – September 1822) never married
4. Philippine Louise de Noailles (1745–1791) married Louis Antoine Armand de Gramont, Duke of Lesparre

== Titles ==
- 13 January 1724 – 25 February 1737 — Mademoiselle de Brissac
- 25 February 1737 – 24 June 1766 — The Duchess of Ayen.
- 24 June 1766 – 22 August 1793 — The Duchess of Noailles.
