= Henriette Anne Louise d'Aguesseau =

French duchess (1737–1794)

- Duchess of Noailles
- Born: 12 February 1737; Kingdom of France
- Died: 22 July 1794 (aged 57); Paris, French First Republic
- Spouse: Jean-Louis-François de Noailles (m. 1755)
- Issue: Adrien Paul Louis de Noailles; Anne Jeanne Baptiste Louise, Vicomtesse de Noailles; Marie Adrienne Françoise, Marquise de La Fayette; Françoise Antoinette Louise, Comtesse de Thezan du Pourjol; Anne Paule Dominique, Marquise de Pouzols; Angélique Françoise d'Assise Rosalie, Marquise de Grammont; Louis Gabriel de Noailles
- Father: Jean Baptiste Paulin d'Aguesseau de Fresne
- Mother: Anne Louise Françoise du Pré

Henriette Anne Louise d'Aguesseau, Duchess of Noailles, Princess of Tingry (12 February 1737 – 22 July 1794), was a French salon hostess and duchess, the heiress of her grandfather, Henri François d'Aguesseau, and wife of Jean Louis François de Noailles, Count and Duke of Ayen.

== Life ==
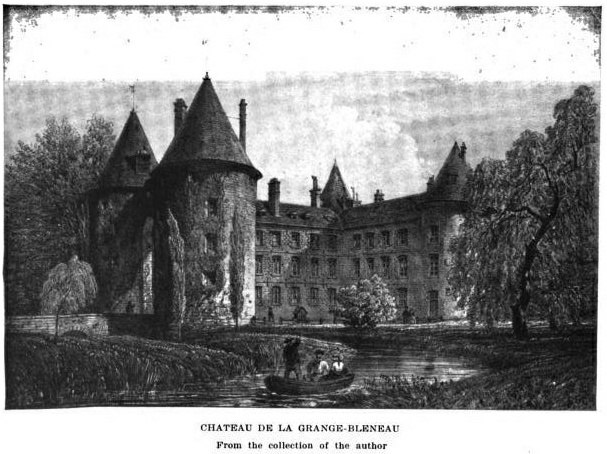
Château de la Grange-Bléneau, her mother's ancestral home

She was the daughter of Jean Baptiste Paulin d'Aguesseau de Fresne, Count of Compans and of Maligny, who married, on 29 February 1736, her mother, Anne Louise Françoise du Pré, Dame of la Grange-Bleneau. Her father was successively adviser to the Parliament, Commissioner of the Second Chamber of the Palais Queries, Master of Requests, State Councilor regular (in 1734), Dean's Council, and Provost Master of Ceremonies of the Order of the Holy Spirit. Her mother died the day after she was born, on 13 February 1737.

She was the paternal granddaughter of Henri François d'Aguesseau (1668–1751), Chancellor of France three times between 1717 and 1750.

After her father remarried, she was educated by Mme. d'Héricourt at the Convent of the Visitation at Saint-Denis. At the age of fourteen, she was educated by her stepmother, Mme. d'Aguesseau de Fresnes:

She preferred reading and gardening--into which latter skill she had been initiated, in the park at Fresnes, by her grandfather the chancellor. His death in 1750 came as a dreadful shock to her. She had adored the courteous and attentive old gentleman.

=== Hôtel de Noailles ===
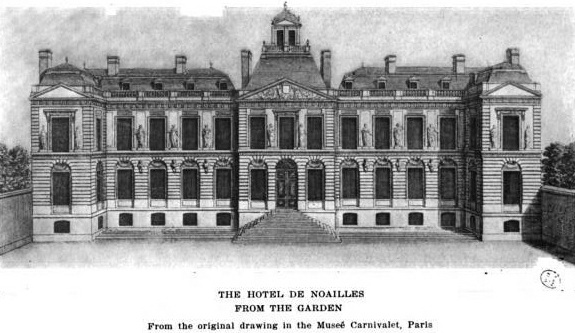
Hôtel de Noailles in Paris

After the death of her grandfather, Henri François d'Aguesseau, she became an heiress. She was married to Jean-Paul-François de Noailles on 25 February 1755. The arranged marriage had been worked out by Adrien-Maurice, 3rd duc de Noailles, who had worked with Chancellor d'Aguesseau.

She maintained a salon at the family residence in Paris, the Hôtel de Noailles.

She disapproved of the arranged marriage of her daughter Adrienne with Gilbert du Motier, Marquis de Lafayette, in view of their youth. After a year's delay while she managed their courtship, they were married at the Hôtel de Noailles.

=== Death ===
At the death of her father-in-law, Louis de Noailles, 4th Duke of Noailles, she returned to France. In May 1794, during the Reign of Terror, she was arrested at Hôtel de Noailles and imprisoned in Luxembourg Prison (see Prison du Luxembourg) in Paris.

Along with her mother-in-law, Catherine de Cossé-Brissac duchesse de Noailles, and daughter, Anne Jeanne Baptiste Louise vicomtesse de Noailles, she was guillotined, on 22 July 1794. She was buried in a mass grave at Picpus Cemetery.

The Château de la Grange-Bléneau passed from her maternal grandfather, through her, to her daughter, Adrienne de La Fayette.
