= Solange d'Ayen =

French noblewoman and journalist (1898–1976)

- Duchess of Ayen
- Full name: Solange Marie Christine Louise de Labriffe
- Other names: Solange de Labriffe; Solange de Noailles
- Born: 5 April 1898; Amiens, France
- Died: 3 November 1976 (aged 78); Paris, France
- Buried: Château de Maintenon
- Noble family: Labriffe (by birth); Noailles (by marriage)
- Spouse: Jean Maurice Paul Jules de Noailles (m. 1919; died 1945)
- Issue: Geneviève de Noailles; Adrien Maurice de Noailles
- Father: Camille de Labriffe
- Mother: Anne-Marie de Vassart d'Hozier
- Occupation: Journalist; fashion editor

Solange Marie Christine Louise de Labriffe, Duchess of Ayen (5 April 1898 – 3 November 1976), known professionally as Solange d'Ayen, Solange de Noailles, and Solange de Labriffe, was a French noblewoman and journalist, known for being the fashion editor of French Vogue magazine from the 1920s until the 1940s. She also wrote for American Vogue. She was born into the House of Labriffe and was named Duchess of Ayen by marrying Jean Maurice Paul Jules de Noailles, the 6th Duke of Ayen in 1919, with whom she had two children.

She survived imprisonment under the Nazi regime in occupied France after being arrested by the Nazis in 1942. She died in Paris on 3 November 1976 at the age of 78.

== Early life ==
Solange Marie Christine Louise de Labriffe was born in Amiens, in northern France, on 5 April 1898. Born into the House of Labriffe, her father was Camille, Count of Labriffe, and her mother was Countess Anne-Marie Vassart d'Hozier. She had an older sister, Marie de Labriffe (1893–1985).

== Career ==
In the late 1920s, Solange started working as a fashion consultant and later became the fashion editor of French Vogue magazine under the name Solange de Noailles. By October 1928, she was signing her articles as Solange d'Ayen. She also wrote for American Vogue. Irish journalist Carmel Snow, who was working for Vogue at that time, said of Solange: "she was the person I most wanted at that time to fashion myself on". Solange was well-connected in the Paris social circle known as "le tout Paris" and introduced Snow to several members of the Paris elite.

In 1935, she helped Vogue editor-in-chief Edna Woolman Chase persuade French painter Christian Bérard – a close friend of hers – to work for the magazine as a fashion illustrator.

She worked as a fashion editor of French Vogue until the 1940s. In 1949, she was managing the fashion house of Robert Piguet.

In 1951, she became an editor of Maison & Jardin magazine.

Towards the end of her life, she was known as Solange de Labriffe.

== Personal life ==
=== Relationships ===
Solange married Jean Maurice Paul Jules de Noailles, the 6th Duke of Ayen, on 16 June 1919 and was named Duchess of Ayen. They lived at the Château de Maintenon and had two children; a daughter, Geneviève Hélène Anne Marie Yolande de Noailles (1921–1998), and a son, Adrien Maurice Edmond Marie Camille de Noailles (1925–1944), a soldier who died in Rupt-sur-Moselle during World War II at the age of 19.

She was a close friend of several artists such as French fashion designer Coco Chanel, Swiss fashion designer Robert Piguet, French painter Christian Bérard, and American photographer Lee Miller.

=== Imprisonment during World War II ===
Her husband, Jean de Noailles, was a member of the French Resistance during World War II and was arrested by the Gestapo on 22 January 1942, as a result of an anonymous denunciation. He died at the Bergen-Belsen concentration camp on 14 April 1945, a few days before the end of the war. Solange was also arrested by the Nazis in 1942 and sent to the Fresnes Prison, while her family and friends such as Miller were unaware of what had happened to her. Solange was said to be "a shadow of herself" when Miller found her after the war. In 1952, the Paris military court sentenced Suzanne Provost, a Gestapo collaborator accused of having denounced Jean de Noailles, to 20 years of imprisonment. In 1954, Solange formally accused SS officer Helmut Knochen of having kidnapped her husband. Knochen was sentenced to death by a Parisian military tribunal in 1954, but was later pardoned by President de Gaulle and released in 1962.

French fashion designer Hubert de Givenchy, who had met Solange while he was working as an apprentice of Robert Piguet, described her as a "great beauty", who had "classic taste", and said that she always wore black because she had lost her husband and son in the war.

== Death ==
Solange died in Paris at the age of 78 on 3 November 1976. She was buried at the Château de Maintenon in France.

== In popular culture ==
In 1939, French composer Francis Poulenc dedicated his song "Fleurs" to Solange.

In 2023, Solange was portrayed by French actress Marion Cotillard in the Lee Miller biopic Lee, directed by American filmmaker Ellen Kuras.

== See also ==
- Duke of Ayen
