= Adrien de Noailles, 8th Duke of Noailles =

French duke

Adrien Maurice Victurnien Mathieu de Noailles, 8th Duke of Noailles (22 September 1869 – 23 October 1953), was a French aristocrat and Olympian.

== Early life ==
He was the eldest son of Jules Charles Victurnien de Noailles, 7th Duke of Noailles, and Clotilde Caroline Antoinette de La Ferté-Meun Molé de Champlâtreux. Among his younger brothers was Count Mathieu Fernand Frédéric Pascal de Noailles, who married the writer Princess Anna Elisabeth Bibesco-Bassaraba de Brancovan (a daughter of Prince Grégoire Bibesco-Bassaraba).

His paternal grandparents were Paul de Noailles, 6th Duke of Noailles (who succeeded his grand-uncle Jean de Noailles, 5th Duke of Noailles, as Duke of Noailles in 1824), and Alice de Rochechouart-Mortemart (a daughter of Victurnien de Rochechouart, 8th Duke of Mortemart). His maternal grandparents were Count Hubert de La Ferté-Meun and Elisabeth Françoise Molé de Champlâtreux.

== Career ==
Upon on his father's death in 1895, he succeeded to the dukedom of Noailles, and inherited his father's estate, including the Château de Maintenon in the Eure-et-Loir département of France (best known today as the private residence of Louis XIV's second wife, Madame de Maintenon).

=== Olympic career ===
A noted equestrian, the Duke competed in the mail coach event at the 1900 Summer Olympics, one of five equestrian competitions held in late May and early June 1900 at the International Horse Show in Paris. The event was part of the Exposition Universelle, and later classified as part of the 1900 Summer Olympics.

== Personal life ==
On 5 December 1892, he married Yolande Louise Marie Valentine d'Albert de Luynes (1870–1952), a daughter of Charles Honoré Emmanuel d'Albert de Luynes, 9th Duke of Luynes, and Yolande Françoise Marie Julienne de La Rochefoucauld (a daughter of Sosthène II de La Rochefoucauld, 4th Duke of Doudeauville). Together, they were the parents of three children:

- Jean Maurice Paul Jules de Noailles (1893–1945), styled Duke of Ayen, a member of the French Resistance who was killed in the Bergen-Belsen concentration camp in April 1945.
- Yolande Marie Clothilde Charlotte (1896–1976)
- Élisabeth Pauline Sabine Marie (1898–1969), a tennis player who competed in the 1920 Summer Olympics, winning a bronze medal.

The Duchess died in Cannes on 18 October 1952. The Duke died on 23 October 1953. As his only son (and his son) predeceased him during World War II, he was succeeded by his nephew, François de Noailles.

French nobility
Preceded by Jules-Charles-Victurnien	Duke of Noailles; 1895–1953	Succeeded by François
Preceded by Jules-Charles-Victurnien	Duke of Ayen; 1885–1895	Succeeded by Jean-Maurice-Paul-Jules
