= Jules de Noailles, 7th Duke of Noailles =

Jules Charles Victurnien de Noailles, 7th Duke of Noailles (12 October 1826 – 6 March 1895), was a French aristocrat.

== Early life ==
He was born in Paris on 12 October 1826. He was the eldest son of Paul de Noailles, 6th Duke of Noailles (who succeeded his grand-uncle Jean de Noailles, 5th Duke of Noailles, as Duke of Noailles in 1824), and Alice de Rochechouart-Mortemart (a daughter of Victurnien de Rochechouart, 8th Duke of Mortemart). His younger brother was the diplomat, Emmanuel Henri Victurnien de Noailles, Marquis de Noailles, the French envoy to the United States and the French ambassador to Italy, the Ottoman Empire, and Germany.

His paternal grandparents were Jules de Noailles, Marquis de Noailles (a son of Emmanuel Marie de Noailles, Marquis of Noailles), and Pauline Laurette Le Couteulx du Molay (a daughter of Jacques Jean Le Couteulx, Seigneur du Molay).

== Career ==
Upon his father's death in 1885, he succeeded to the title of Duke of Noailles.

== Personal life ==
He married Clotilde Caroline Antoinette de La Ferté-Meun Molé de Champlâtreux, a daughter of Count Hubert de La Ferté-Meun and Elisabeth Françoise Molé de Champlâtreux. Together, they were the parents of:

- Adrien Maurice Victurnien Mathieu de Noailles, 8th Duke of Noailles (1869–1953), who married Yolande Louise Marie Valentine d'Albert de Luynes, a daughter of Charles Honoré Emmanuel d'Albert de Luynes, 9th Duke of Luynes, and Yolande Françoise Marie Julienne de La Rochefoucauld (a daughter of Sosthène II de La Rochefoucauld, 4th Duke of Doudeauville).
- Hélie Guillaume Hubert de Noailles (1871–1932), styled Marquis de Noailles, who married Corisande de Gramont, a daughter of Agénor de Gramont, 11th Duke of Gramont and, his second wife, Marguerite de Rothschild.
- Mathieu Fernand Frédéric Pascal de Noailles (1873–1942), styled Count de Noailles, who married the writer Princess Anna Elisabeth Bibesco-Bassaraba de Brancovan.

The Duke died in Paris on 6 March 1895. He was succeeded by his son, Adrien de Noailles.

French nobility
Preceded by Paul	Duke of Noailles; 1885–1895	Succeeded by Adrien-Maurice-Victurnien-Mathieu
Preceded by Paul	Counts and Dukes of Ayen; 1824–1885	Succeeded by Adrien-Maurice-Victurnien-Mathieu
