= Timoléon =

Timoléon can be a masculine given name or a middle name. Notable people with the name include:

== Given name ==
- Timoléon C. Brutus, Haitian politician and historian
- Timoléon d'Espinay, French soldier
- Timoléon Cheminais de Montaigu, French Jesuit pulpit orator

== Middle name ==
- Artus Timoléon Louis de Cossé, 5th Duke of Brissac, French nobleman
- Charles Timoléon Louis de Cossé, 6th Duke of Brissac, French nobleman
- Jean Paul Timoléon de Cossé, 7th Duke of Brissac, French general
- Louis Hercule Timoléon de Cossé, 8th Duke of Brissac, French military commander
