= Adrienne Catherine de Noailles =

French salon holder and letter writer (1741–1813)

- Born: 24 December 1741; Paris, France
- Died: December 1813 (aged 71–72); France
- Occupations: Salon holder, Letter writer
- Known for: Hosted Mozart in 1764; engaged in political salons during the French Revolution
- Spouse(s): René de Froulay, Comte de Tessé
- Family: Daughter of Louis, 4th duc de Noailles; sister of 5th duc de Noailles; aunt of Marie Adrienne Françoise de Noailles

Adrienne Catherine de Noailles, comtesse de Tessé (French: [dənoaj dətɛse]; 24 December 1741 – December 1813), was a French salon holder and letter writer. She was daughter of Louis, 4th duc de Noailles, sister of the 5th duc de Noailles and aunt of Marie Adrienne Françoise de Noailles. She was known for her salons and her correspondence with Thomas Jefferson in the early 19th century.

== Life ==
On 20 June 1755 she married René de Froulay, Comte de Tessé, last Marquis de Lavardin (1736–1814), grandson of René de Froulay de Tessé. In February 1764, on his tour of Paris, the child prodigy Mozart dedicated two sonatas for piano and violin (KV8 and KV9) to her. The comtesse gave the eight-year-old composer a gold snuffbox and gold watch.

== French Revolution ==
In the early days of the revolutionary period, she was in Paris taking an interest in, and attending the Assembly, and holding a salon:

In the salon of Madame de Tessé, who according to the Goncourt brothers, had been formulating plans for a constitutional monarchy for twenty years, "the most advanced opinions" found themselves amid what Guizot called, "a small group with elegant manners."

This salon was held at her townhouse on the Rue de Varenne, Faubourg Saint-Germain. A room from the Hôtel de Tessé, was given to the Metropolitan Museum by Mrs. Herman N. Straus.

Lafayette, who was her nephew-in-law, often went to her country house, the Château de Chaville, built in 1766, near Paris, as a part of the social scene. Thomas Jefferson met Madame de Tessé when he was minister to France between 1784 and 1789. Jefferson began a long correspondence with her after visiting Chaville.

Gouverneur Morris after being received at Versailles, 5 March 1789, visited:

Return to Paris and dine with Madame de Tessé—republicans of the first feather. The countess, who is a very sensible woman, has formed her ideas of government in a manner not suited, I think, either to the situation, the circumstances, or the disposition of France, and there are many such,

And on 17 September 1789, he noted:

She is a convert to my principles. We have a gay conversation of some minutes on their affairs, in which I mingle sound maxims of government with that piquant légèreté which this nation delights in. I am fortunate, and at going away she follows me and insists that I dine with her next time I come to Versailles.

He met her on 22 July 1792:

Later in the evening, visit Madame de Tessé. She is deeply engaged in a political discussion. I find that the high democrats begin to cool a little, and I think that by degrees they will feel, though they would not understand reason.

Her cousins, Henriette-Anne-Louise d'Aguesseau de La Grange, and Catherine de Cossé-Brissac, and niece, Louise vicomtesse de Noailles, were guillotined on 22 July 1794.

== After the Revolution ==
In 1797 she lived in exile at Wittmoldt, Holstein, near the town of Plön, with a large entourage, her Montagu nephews, an old priest, the Abbé de Luchet. Her niece, Adrienne de La Fayette recuperated nearby at Lehmkuhlen, Holstein. At Wittmoldt, Anastasie de Lafayette married Juste-Charles de la Tour-Maubourg, the brother of another Olmütz detainee, Charles César de Fay de La Tour-Maubourg.

In 1804, she sold the house to Johannes Schuback. She purchased a townhouse in Paris, at No. 8, rue d'Anjou (now rue du Faubourg Saint-Honoré).

Upon returning from exile, Monsieur and Madame de Tessé returned to Lavardin Castle, in Mézières, and his hôtel in the city of Le Mans (near Red Pillar) and the Bazoge Forest. What remained of his immense fortune allowed them again, this time to live more richly. We know that in the last years of his life, he gave his Hôtel de Tessé, to make a seminar and a bishopric, in Sarthe and Mayenne departments. Her husband, the Comte de Tessé, last Marquis of Lavardin, died in Paris on 21 January 1814, aged 78.

== Horticulture ==
She was particularly interested in native American plants, which Jefferson ordered for her château garden. In 1788 the countess wrote requesting him to send her the shrub beautyberry (Callicarpa americana) and a persimmon tree (Diospyros virginiana). Jefferson also gave her a specimen of sweet shrub (Calycanthus floridus). While in France he had encountered the white heliotrope (Heliotropium arborescens), native to Peru, and sent seeds home to his friend Francis Eppes for Monticello, noting that it was:

to be sowed in the spring. a delicious flower, but I suspect it must be planted in boxes & kept in the house in the winter, the smell rewards the care.

In 1811 Jefferson acknowledged the receipt of seeds, she had sent in 1809, of the native Chinese goldenrain tree (Koelreuteria paniculata), which was by then growing at Monticello—the first such specimen in the United States. Jefferson wrote:

I cherish it with particular attentions, as it daily reminds me of the friendship with which you have honored me.

I learn with great pleasure the success of your new gardens at Auenay. No occupation can be more delightful or useful. They will have the merit of inducing you to forget those of Chaville.
