= Eure Canal =

Water canal in France

Coordinates: 48.5822°N 1.5842°E

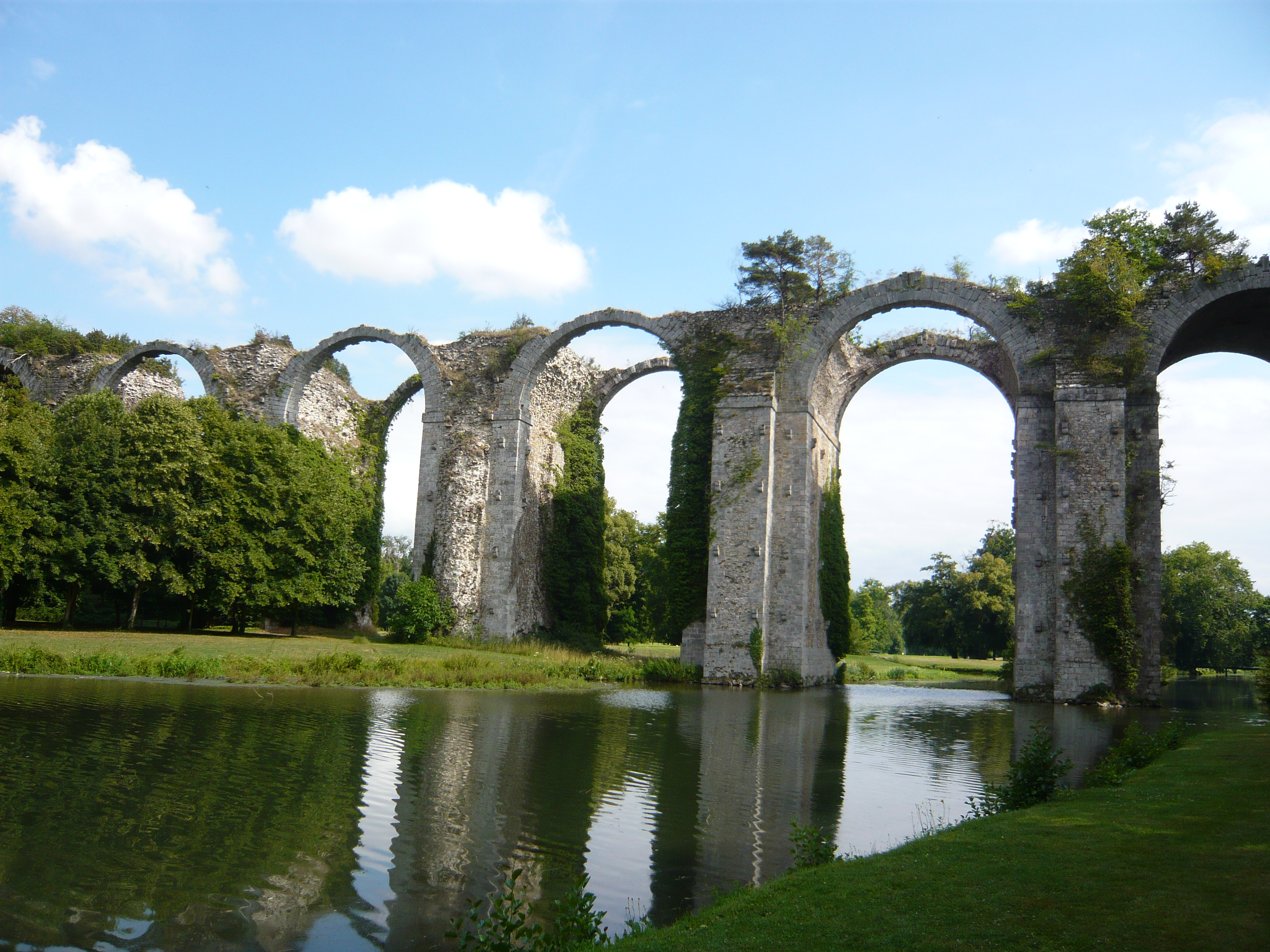
Remaining arches of the aqueduct through the gardens of the château de Maintenon (2012)

The Canal de l'Eure (French pronunciation: [kanal də lœʁ]), made necessary by the insufficient water supply for the Château de Versailles and the water features of its gardens, was designed for King Louis XIV by his military engineer Vauban, based on preliminary surveys by Philippe de La Hire. The population of the town of Versailles multiplied by a factor of ten during the first decade or so of the court's residence. Having exhausted all the nearer water sources, Louvois, at the king's command, organized the planning of this "Canal Louis XIV", which was never in fact intended to be navigable. Its length was over 80 kilometers.

Waters of the Eure were diverted somewhat downstream from Pontgouin and were led to the Etang de la Tour, today in the department of Yvelines. The ruinously expensive project, worked on from 1685 to 1690, was never completed. Passing through the gardens of the château de Maintenon, purchased by Madame de Maintenon in 1675, its arches ranging in three colossal tiers, nevertheless seemed to François-René de Chateaubriand "a work worthy of the Caesars".

== Notes ==
- This article is based on a translation from French Wikipedia.
