= Henri François d'Aguesseau =

French statesman (1668–1751)

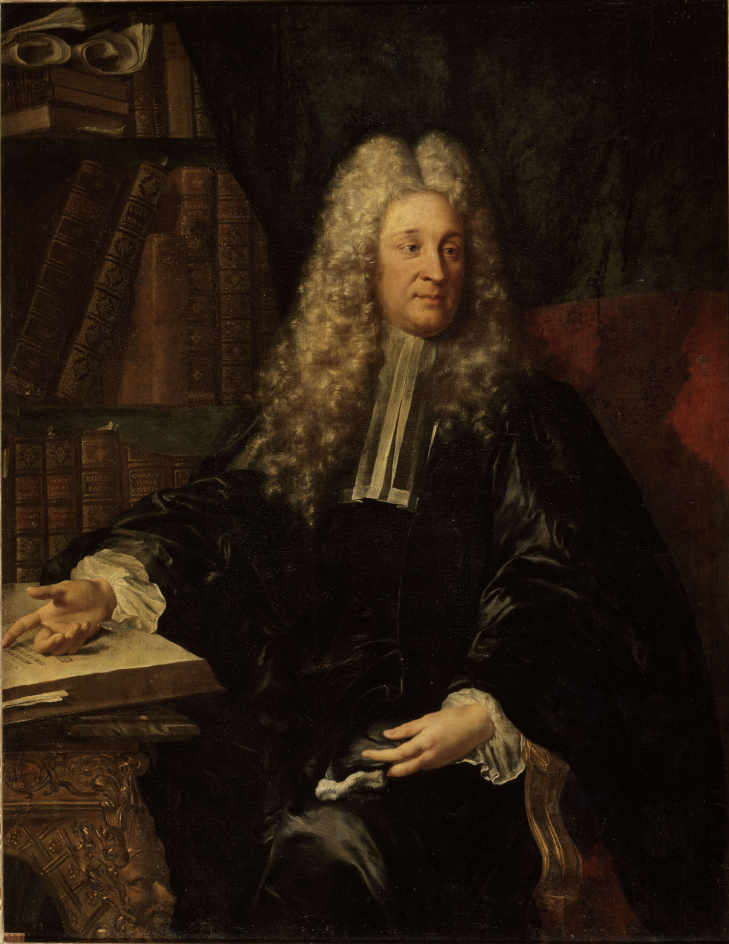
Portrait attributed to Hyacinthe Rigaud, 1705–1715

Henri François d'Aguesseau, seigneur de Fresnes (French: [ɑ̃ʁi fʁɑ̃swa daɡɛso]; 27 November 1668 – 5 February 1751) was Chancellor of France three times between 1717 and 1750 and was pronounced by Voltaire to be "the most learned magistrate France ever possessed".

== Early life ==
He was born in Limoges, France, to a family of magistrates. His father, Henri d'Aguesseau, a hereditary councillor of the parlement of Metz, was a man of singular ability and breadth of view who, after holding successively the posts of intendant of Limousin, Guyenne and Languedoc, was in 1685 called to Paris as councillor of state, appointed director-general of commerce and manufactures in 1695, president of the council of commerce in 1700 and a member of the council of the regency for finance. By him he was early initiated into affairs and brought up in religious principles deeply tinged with Jansenism.

D'Aguesseau studied law under Jean Domat, whose influence is apparent in both the legal writings and legislative work of the chancellor. When little more than twenty-one years of age he was, through his father's influence with Louis XIV, appointed one of the three advocates-general to the parlement of Paris; and the eloquence and learning which he displayed in his first speech gained him a very high reputation. D'Aguesseau was in fact the first great master of forensic eloquence in France.

== Political career ==
In 1700 d'Aguesseau was appointed procurator-general; and in this office, which he filled for seventeen years, he gained the greatest popularity by his defence of the rights of the Gallican Church in the Quietist troubles and in those connected with the bull Unigenitus.

In February 1717 d'Aguesseau was made chancellor by the regent Philip II, Duke of Orléans; but was deprived of the seals in January of the following year and exiled to his estate of Fresnes in Brie, on account of his steady opposition to the projects of the famous John Law, which had been adopted by the regent and his ministers.

In June 1720 d'Aguesseau was recalled to satisfy public opinion; and he contributed not a little by the firmness and sagacity of his counsels to calm the public disturbance and repair the mischief which had been done. Law himself had acted as the messenger of his recall; and it is said that d'Aguesseau's consent to accept the seals from his hand greatly diminished his popularity. The parlement continuing its opposition to the registering of the bull Unigenitus, d'Aguesseau, fearing a schism and a religious war in France, assisted Guillaume Dubois, the favorite of the regent, in his endeavour to force the parlement to register the bull, acquiesced in the exile of the magistrates and allowed the Great Council to assume the power of registration, which legally belonged to the parlement alone. The people unjustly attributed his conduct to a base compliance with the favorite. He certainly opposed Dubois in other matters; and when Dubois became chief minister d'Aguesseau was deprived of his office (1 March 1722).

D'Aguesseau retired to his estate, where he passed five years of which he always spoke with delight. The Scriptures, which he read and compared in various languages, and the jurisprudence of his own and other countries, formed the subjects of his more serious studies; the rest of his time was devoted to philosophy, literature and gardening. From these occupations he was recalled to court by the advice of Cardinal Fleury in 1727, and on 15 August was named chancellor for the third time, but the seals were not restored to him till ten years later. During these years he endeavoured to mediate in the disputes between the court and the parlement.

When he was at last reinstated in office, he completely withdrew from all political affairs, and devoted himself entirely to his duties as chancellor and to the achievement of those reforms which had long occupied his thoughts. He aimed, as others had tried before him, to draw up in a single code all the laws of France, but was unable to accomplish his task. Besides some important enactments regarding donations, testaments and successions, he introduced various regulations for improving the forms of procedure, for ascertaining the limits of jurisdictions and for effecting a greater uniformity in the execution of the laws throughout the several provinces. These reforms constitute an epoch in the history of French jurisprudence, and have placed the name of d'Aguesseau in the same rank with those of L'Hôpital and Lamoignon - indeed he stands with them as one of the seven large statues that overlook the chamber of the French Senate in the Luxembourg Palace. As a magistrate also he was so conscientious that the duc de Saint-Simon in his Mémoirs complained that he spent too much time over the cases that came before him.

== Retirement and death ==
In 1750, when upwards of eighty-two years of age, d'Aguesseau retired from the duties without giving up the rank of chancellor. He died on 5 February 1751.

== Family ==
His grandson, Henri Cardin Jean Baptiste, Marquis d'Aguesseau (1746–1826), was advocate-general in the parlement of Paris and deputy in the Estates-General. Under the Consulate he became president of the court of appeal and later minister at Copenhagen. He was elected to the French Academy in 1787.

His granddaughter Henriette Anne Louise d'Aguesseau was the mother-in-law of the Marquis de La Fayette. The present Duke of Noailles is a descendant of Henri François through his granddaughter who was executed in the revolution.

== Notes ==
M.Villefort in the Count of Monty Christo is referred to as “the great D’Aguesseau” in chapter 69.
