= Counts and dukes of Ayen =

This is a list of counts, and later dukes of the county and duchy of Ayen.

== Counts of Ayen ==
The title of count of Ayen was created in ...

== Dukes of Ayen (1737) ==
The title of duke of Ayen was created in 1737 for the benefit of Louis, duke of Noailles by the elevation of the county of Ayen to duchy. The heir apparent of the duchy of Noailles is bestowed with this title.

- 1713–1793 : 1st duke Louis, also marshal of France
- 1739–1824 : 2nd duke John Louis
- 1802–1885 : 3rd duke Paul
- 1826–1895 : 4th duke Jules Charles
- 1869–1895 : 5th duke Adrian Maurice
- 1895–1945 : 6th duke John Maurice, Mort pour la France in Bergen Belsen
- 1945–1953 : 7th duke Francis Agenor
- 1953–2009 : 8th duke Hélie-Marie (b. 1943)

The heir-apparent is his son, Emmanuel Paul Louis Marie, Duc d’Ayen (b. Washington 14 February 1983)
