= François de Noailles, 9th Duke of Noailles =

François de Noailles
- 9th Duke of Noailles
- Predecessor: Adrien de Noailles
- Successor: Hélie de Noailles
- Full name: François Agénor Alexandre Hélie de Noailles
- Born: 20 November 1905
- Died: 11 January 2009 (aged 103)
- Spouse: Charlotte de Caumont La Force
- Issue: Hélie de Noailles
- Father: Marquis Hélie Guillaume de Noailles
- Mother: Corisande de Gramont

François de Noailles, 9th Duke of Noailles (François Agénor Alexandre Hélie; 20 November 1905 – 11 January 2009) was the nephew of Adrien de Noailles, 8th Duke of Noailles. His parents were Marquis Hélie Guillaume de Noailles (26 May 1871 – 24 May 1932) and Corisande de Gramont (8 August 1880 – 5 March 1977), daughter of the 11th Duke of Gramont and Marguerite de Rothschild.

He styled himself as Duke of Noailles (French: duc de Noailles) upon the death in 1953 of his uncle, the 8th Duke of Noailles.

== Family ==
He married Charlotte de Caumont La Force (29 September 1917 – 19 December 2002) in 1936 at Paris. They had one child, a son named Hélie-Marie-Auguste-Jacques-Bertrand-Philippe de Noailles, Duke of Ayen (born 1943), who succeeded him upon his death at Château de Champlâtreux in 2009.

French nobility
Preceded by Adrien-Maurice-Victurnien-Mathieu	Duke of Noailles; 1953–2009	Succeeded by Hélie-Marie-Auguste-Jacques-Bertrand-Philippe
Preceded by Jean-Maurice-Paul-Jules	Duke of Ayen; 1945–1953	Succeeded by Hélie-Marie-Auguste-Jacques-Bertrand-Philippe
