= Charles Timoléon Louis de Cossé, 6th Duke of Brissac =

French nobleman and general

Charles Timoléon Louis de Cossé
- 6th Duke of Brissac
- Full name: Charles Timoléon Louis de Cossé
- Born: 1 February 1693; Paris, France
- Died: 18 April 1732 (aged 39); Paris, France
- Spouse: Catherine Madeleine Pecoil
- Issue: Catherine, Duchess of Noailles; Françoise, Duchess of Charost
- Father: Artus Timoléon Louis de Cossé, 6th Duke of Brissac
- Mother: Marie Louise Béchameil

Charles Timoléon Louis de Cossé, 6th Duke of Brissac (1 February 1693 – 18 April 1732) was a French nobleman and general during the reign of Kings Louis XIV and Louis XV. Cossé also served as Grand Panetier of France.

== Children ==
1. Catherine de Cossé (13 January 1724 – 22 July 1794) married Louis de Noailles, Duke of Ayen and Marshal of France
2. Françoise Judith de Cossé (born 14 January 1724) married Armand Louis de Béthune, Duke of Charost.
3. Anne Françoise Judith de Cossé (born 14 June 1726) never married.
