= Louis de Noailles, 4th Duke of Noailles =

French peer and Marshal of France (1713–1793)

Louis de Noailles
- Duke of Noailles
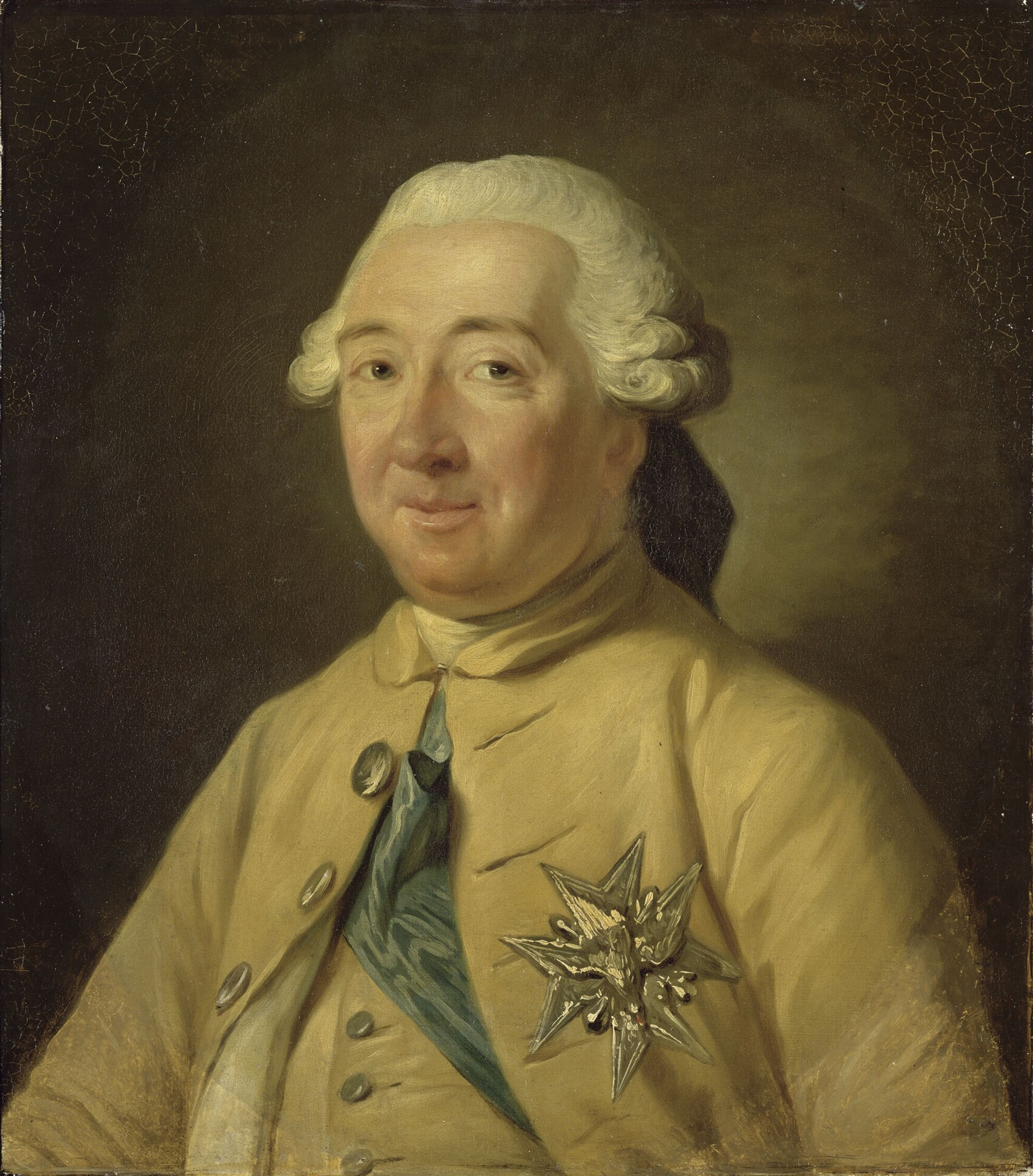
- Born: 21 April 1713; Versailles, France
- Died: 22 August 1793 (aged 80); Saint-Germain-en-Laye, France
- Buried: Picpus Cemetery, Paris
- Noble family: Noailles
- Spouse: Catherine de Cossé (m. 1737)
- Issue: Jean, Duke of Noailles; Adrienne Catherine, Countess of Tessé; Emmanuel Marie Louis, Marqius of Noailles; Philippine Louise de Noailles
- Father: Adrien Maurice, Duke of Noailles
- Mother: Françoise Charlotte d'Aubigné

Louis de Noailles, 4th Duke of Noailles (21 April 1713 in Versailles – 22 August 1793 in Saint-Germain-en-Laye) was a French peer and Marshal of France.

== Early life ==
He was the son of Françoise Charlotte d'Aubigné, niece of Madame de Maintenon, and a nephew of Marie Victoire de Noailles, daughter-in-law of King Louis XIV.

== Career ==
Louis bore the title of Duke of Ayen until his father's death in 1766 when he became Duke of Noailles.

He served in most of the wars of the eighteenth century without particular distinction but was nevertheless made a Marshal of France in 1775. He refused to emigrate during the Revolution, and died from natural causes in August 1793, thus escaping the fate of the guillotine.

The duke's widow, granddaughter, and daughter-in-law were guillotined on 22 July 1794, twenty-five days after his brother and sister, sister-in-law, their daughter-in-law, and niece had met the same fate. Another granddaughter, Adrienne, wife of Gilbert du Motier, marquis de La Fayette, was saved due to the efforts of James Monroe, then America's Minister to France. Adrienne and her husband are buried with the Noailles and the other nobles who fell to the guillotine at Picpus Cemetery.

== Personal life ==
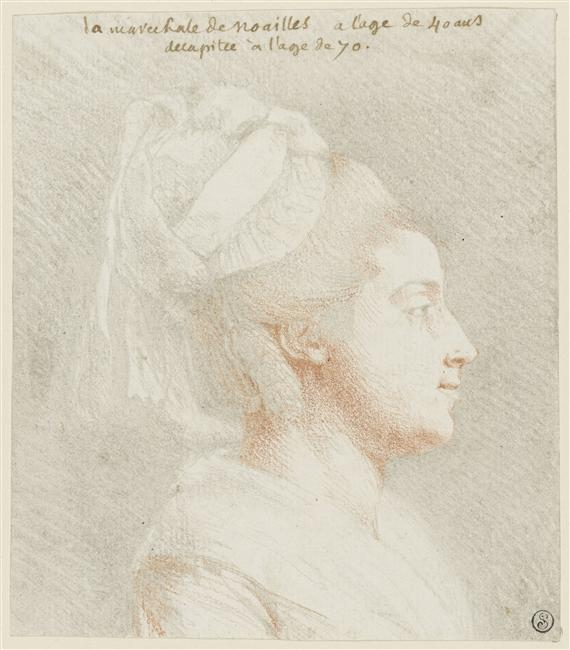
A highly realistic depiction of his wife, Catherine de Cossé (1724–1794), 1764

On 25 February 1737, he married Catherine Françoise Charlotte de Cossé-Brissac, with whom he had four children, two sons and two daughters:

1. Jean-Louis-Paul-François de Noailles (1739–1824), who married Henriette Anne Louise d'Aguesseau in 1755. After her death in 1794, he married Baroness Wilhelmine Justine von Mosheim in 1796.
2. Adrienne Catherine de Noailles (1741–1813), who married René de Froulay, Count of Tessé, Marquis of Lavardin, a grandson of René de Froulay de Tessé in 1755.
3. Emmanuel-Marie-Louis de Noailles (1743–1822), who married Charlotte Françoise de Hallencourt.
4. Philippine Louise de Noailles.

Louis de Noailles was succeeded by his eldest son, Jean de Noailles, 5th Duke of Noailles. The titles remain among the 4th Duke's descendants in the 21st century.

French nobility
Preceded by Adrien-Maurice	Duke of Noailles; 1766–1793	Succeeded by Jean-Louis-Paul-François
Preceded by New creation	Duke of Ayen; 1737–1766	Succeeded by Jean-Louis-Paul-François
