= Artus Timoléon Louis de Cossé, 5th Duke of Brissac =

Artus Timoléon Louis de Cossé
- 5th Duke of Brissac
- Born: 1668; Paris, France
- Died: 1 July 1709 (aged 41); Paris, France
- Spouse: Marie Louise Béchameil
- Issue: Timoléon Louis, 6th Duke of Brissac; René, Count of Cossé
- Artus Timoléon Louis de Cossé
- House: Cossé
- Father: Timoléon de Cossé, Count of Cossé
- Mother: Elisabeth le Charron, suo jure Dame of Ormeilles

Artus Timoléon Louis de Cossé, 5th Duke of Brissac (1668 – 1 July 1709) was a French nobleman and the 5th Duke of Brissac. He was created the Grand Panetier of France in 1677. Created a colonel in the regiment of Gournay in 1693, he was officially recognised a Peer of France in 1700 then created a brigadier of the cavalry in 1702.

== Children ==
1. Charles Timoléon Louis de Cossé, 6th Duke of Brissac (1 February 1693 – 18 April 1732) married Catherine Madeleine Pecoil and had children.
2. Marguerite de Cossé
3. René de Cossé, Count of Cossé
