= Françoise Charlotte d'Aubigné =

French aristocrat

Françoise Charlotte
- Lady of Maintenon; Duchess of Noailles
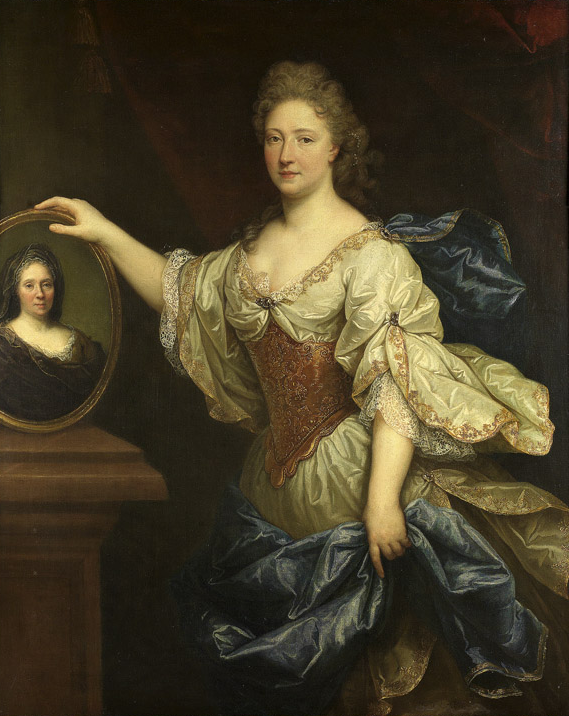
- d'Aubigné holding a portrait of her aunt, by the workshop of Nicolas de Largillière
- Full name: Françoise Charlotte Amable d'Aubigné
- Born: 5 May 1684; Kingdom of France
- Died: 6 October 1739 (aged 55); Kingdom of France
- Noble family: Noailles
- Spouse: Adrien Maurice de Noailles, 3rd Duke of Noailles
- Issue Detail: Louis, Duke of Noailles; Marie Louise, Duchess of La Force; Philippe, Duke of Mouchy
- Father: Charles d'Aubigné
- Mother: Geneviève Piètre

Baroness Françoise Charlotte Amable d'Aubigné-Maintenon, Duchess of Noailles (5 May 1684 – 6 October 1739) was a French aristocrat, the wife of Adrien Maurice de Noailles, 3rd Duke of Noailles. She was the niece of Françoise d'Aubigné, Madame de Maintenon, and her heiress.

== Biography ==
Françoise Charlotte was the only child of Charles d'Aubigné and Geneviève Piètre, who were married on 23 February 1678. Because they were poor, her parents appealed to the future wife of Louis XIV, Madame de Maintenon, to help with her education. Maintenon agreed to help on the condition that Françoise Charlotte would be raised as Maintenon wished and would marry whom Maintenon chose for her. As a result, Madame de Maintenon was later to make her brother's only child the heir to the Maintenon estate which she had owned since 1674.

Madame de Maintenon arranged the marriage of Françoise Charlotte with a member of the powerful House of Noailles. Madame de Maintenon arranged with Anne Jules de Noailles, the father of Madame de Gondrin, future wife of the Count of Toulouse, for the marriage of Françoise Charlotte to his son, Adrien Maurice, Count of Ayen. The wedding occurred on 31 March 1698 when she was aged 13 and he was approaching 20. During the following 21 years their marriage produced six children.

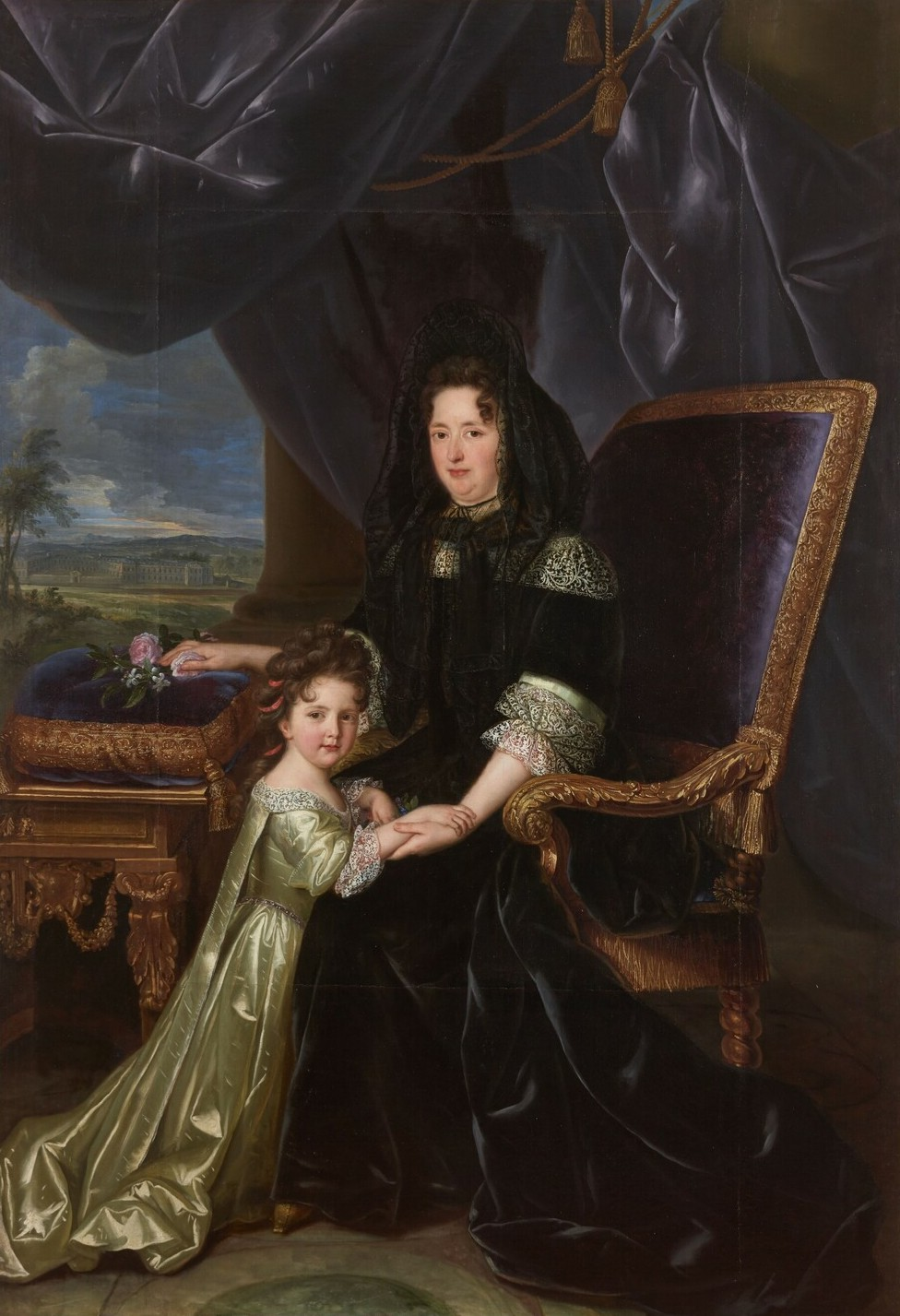
d'Aubigné with her aunt, by Louis Ferdinand Elle the Elder c. 1688

Anne-Jules, the 2nd duc de Noailles, died in 1708 and then Adrien Maurice became the 3rd Duke of Noailles with Françoise Charlotte as his duchess. Later in 1719, after the death of Madame de Maintenon, she inherited the Château de Maintenon and her aunt's wealth, as promised. Thus, from very humble beginnings, Françoise Charlotte rose to the upper levels of French society.

The Duchess of Noailles died in 1739 aged 55 but her husband lived for another 27 years, dying at Versailles at 88. Their two sons Louis, and Philippe, also went on to become marshals of France. The younger son, Philippe, was executed in Reign of Terror in 1794, whereas Louis died in 1793 before the Reign of Terror was fully underway.

Her nephew by marriage was Louis Jean Marie de Bourbon, Duke of Penthièvre, one of the wealthiest man in Europe. Others included the Duke of Éstrées, great-nephew of Gabrielle d'Estrées, a mistress of King Henri IV.

Her descendants include Hélie, Duke of Noailles. Others include Adrienne de Noailles, wife of the famous Marquis de Lafayette; the current King Philippe of Belgium also descended maternally from Françoise Charlotte.

== Issue ==
1. Françoise Adélaide de Noailles (1 September 1704 – January 1776), married Charles de Lorraine in 1717, son of Louis of Lorraine, Count of Armagnac and had no issue; divorced in 1721;
2. Amable Gabrielle de Noailles (18 February 1706 – September 1742), married Honoré Armand de Villars and had one daughter, Amable Angélique de Villars; Amable Angélique may have been the daughter of le chevalier d'Orléans, whose mistress was Amable Gabrielle;
3. Marie Louise de Noailles (8 September 1710 – 22 May 1782), married in 1737 to Jacques Nompar III de Caumont (1714-1755) and divorced in 1742; had no issue;
4. Louis de Noailles, Duke of Ayen, "Duke of Noailles" (21 April 1713 – 22 August 1793), married Catherine Françoise Charlotte de Cossé-Brissac and had issue;Louis and his wife were executed in the Revolution;
5. Philippe de Noailles, "Count of Noailles", Duke of Mouchy (27 December 1715 – 27 June 1794), married the famous Madame Étiquette and had issue; wife was a Lady-in-waiting to Marie Antoinette; Philippe and his wife were executed in the Revolution;
6. Marie Anne Françoise de Noailles (12 January 1719 – 29 June 1793), married in 1744 Ludwig Engelbert de La Marck (1701–1773), Count of Schleiden. She was executed in the Revolution.

== Ancestry ==
Ancestors of Françoise Charlotte d'Aubigné

16. Jean d'Aubigné
8. Agrippa d'Aubigné
17. Catherine de Lestang
4. Constant d'Aubigné
18. Ambroise de Lezay, Baron of Surineau,
9. Susanne de Lezay, Baroness of Surineau
19. Suzanne Renée de Vivonne, Dame of Mursay
2. Charles d'Aubigné
5. Jeanne de Cardillac
1. Françoise Charlotte d'Aubigné
6. Simon Piètre
3. Geneviève Piètre
7. Louise Dantal
