= Duke of Ayen =

coat of arms of the Duke of Ayen, as a Knight of the Order of the Holy Spirit with a coronet of a Duke and Peer of France.

The title Duke of Ayen (duc d'Ayen) was created by King Louis XV on 12 March 1737 raising the former county of Ayen to a Dukedom. It was used as a courtesy title by the eldest son of the Duke of Noailles. The lineage of Dukes of Ayen are cousins to the Dukes of Mouchy, a cadet branch of the House of Noailles.

== List of dukes of Ayen ==
1. 1737–1766 Louis de Noailles (1713–1793) 1st Duke of Ayen (1737) then 4th Duke of Noailles (1766) and Marshal of France
2. 1766–1823 Jean de Noailles (1739–1824), 2nd Duke of Ayen (1766) 5th Duke of Noailles (1793), Peer of France (1814)
3. 1823–1826 Paul de Noailles (1802–1885), 3rd Duke of Ayen (1823) and 6th Duke of Noailles (1824)
4. 1826–1885 Jules de Noailles (1826–1895), 4th Duke of Ayen (1826) then 7th Duke of Noailles (1885)
5. 1885–1895 Adrien de Noailles (1869–1953), 5th Duke of Ayen (1885) then 8th Duke of Noailles (1895)
6. 1895–1945 Jean Maurice Paul Jules de Noailles (1893-1945), 6th Duke of Ayen (1895)
7. 1945–1953 François Agénor Alexandre Hélie de Noailles (1905-2009), called the Marquis de Noailles, 7th Duke of Ayen (1945) then 9th Duke of Noailles (1953)
8. 1953–2009 Hélie de Noailles (1905-2009), called the Count de Noailles, 8th Duke of Ayen (1945) then 10th Duke of Noailles (1953)
9. 2009–present Emmanuel Paul Louis Marie de Noailles (born in 1983), 9th Duke of Ayen.

== Arms ==
- Gueules à la bande d'or
