= Hélie de Noailles, 10th Duke of Noailles =

Hélie Marie Auguste Jacques Bertrand Philippe de Noailles, 10th Duke of Noailles (born 16 July 1943, in Boulogne-Billancourt), simply known as Hélie de Noailles, is a French nobleman, diplomat and trade representative. He was styled with the courtesy title duc d'Ayen (Duke of Ayen) from 1953 till 2009, and currently with the French title duc de Noailles (Duke of Noailles).

== Early life and education ==
Hélie de Noailles was born in Boulogne-Billancourt as the only son and child of François de Noailles, 9th Duke of Noailles, and Charlotte de Caumont La Force.

After studying at the private catholic school Cours Hattemer, 52, Rue de Londres in Paris, he subsequently obtained a Licentiate in Law from the Paris Law Faculty of the University of Paris, and a diploma from the Institut d'Études Politiques de Paris in 1967, before going on to the École nationale d'administration where he graduated in 1969.

== Career ==
He began his career in the diplomacy and he served with the economic cooperation group of the Minister of Foreign Affairs (1969–1972).

After a short passage to the cabinet of the Prime Minister in the capacity as operations manager in 1972, de Noailles entered the Office de Radiodiffusion Télévision Française (ORTF) as a principal private secretary of the general president-directors Arthur Tells then Marceau Long, then of the president of FR 3, Claude Contamine. He then joined, in the capacity as technical adviser, the cabinets of Andre Rossi, Minister for the Foreign trade (1976–1978), then of Jean-François Deniau, Minister for the Foreign trade (1978–1981), then Minister for Administrative reforms (1981).

The 1981 general election returned him to the Quay d'Orsay, where de Noailles became the second adviser of the French Embassy to the United States (1982–1986). On his return to France, he became director of the development of the Perrodo group (1986–1988), then general president-director of Kelt Énergie France (1988–1992), and finally director at the Maison Lazard and Co (1990–1996). (related to Lazard).

De Noailles chaired the French Society of the Sons of the American Revolution, Société française des Fils de la Révolution Américaine, and since 2001, he has been mayor of the commune of Épinay-Champlâtreux, succeeding his father, who was mayor from 1932 to 2001.

== Personal life ==
On 11 March 1972, de Noailles married Cécile Nadèje Marie Paule Gonin (born 25 November 1945, Boulogne-Billancourt) at Épinay-Champlâtreux. Together they have three children, two daughters and one son:

1. Julie Marie-Christine Françoise (b. Boulogne-Billancourt 11 July 1972)
2. Marie-Alicia Eugénie Charlotte Blandine (b. Boulogne-Billancourt 8 May 1975)
3. Emmanuel Paul Louis Marie, Duke of Ayen (b. Washington, D.C. 14 February 1983).

As heir apparent of the Dukedom of Noailles he was styled with the title Duke of Ayen between 1953 till 2009. At the death of his father in 2009, he became the 10th Duke of Noailles.

Hélie de Noailles is a Knight (Chevalier) of the National Order of Merit (Ordre national du Mérite) of France.

== Ancestry ==
Ancestors of Hélie de Noailles, 10th Duke of Noailles

16. Paul de Noailles, 6th Duke of Noailles
8. Jules de Noailles, 7th Duke of Noailles
17. Alice de Rochechouart de Mortemart
4. Hélie de Noailles, Marquess of Noailles
18. Hubert, Count of La Ferté-Meun
9. Caroline de La Ferté-Meun-Molé de Champlâtreux
19. Elisabeth Molé de Champlâtreux
2. François de Noailles, 9th Duke of Noailles
20. Agénor de Gramont, 10th Duke of Gramont
10. Agénor de Gramont, 11th Duke of Gramont
21. Emma Mackinnon
5. Corisande de Gramont
22. Baron Mayer Carl von Rothschild
11. Marguerite de Rothschild
23. Louise von Rothschild
1. Hélie de Noailles, 10th Duke of Noailles
24. Auguste de Caumont La Force
12. Oliver de Caumont, 11th Duke of La Force
25. Antonine de Celles
6. Auguste de Caumont, 12th Duke of La Force
26. Armand de Maillé de La Tour-Landry, Count of Maillé
13. Blance de Maillé de La Tour-Landry
27. Jeanne Lebrun de Plaisance
3. Charlotte de Caumont La Force
28. Count Alfred de Noailles
14. Amblard, Viscount of Noailles
29. Marie de Beaumont-du-Repaire
7. Marie de Noailles
30. Raoul, Marquess of Gourjault
15. Suzanne de Gourjault
31. Louise de Bergevin

French nobility
Preceded by François	Duke of Noailles; 2009–present	Succeeded by Incumbent
Preceded by François	Duke d'Ayen; 1953–2009	Succeeded by Emmanuel Paul Louis Marie
