= Jean Maurice Paul Jules de Noailles =

French nobleman, member of the French Resistance

Jean Maurice Paul Jules de Noailles, 6th Duke of Ayen (Paris, 18 September 1893 – Bergen-Belsen, 14 April 1945) was the son of Adrien de Noailles, 8th Duke of Noailles and a member of the French Resistance in World War II.

== Biography ==
He was the only son of Adrien de Noailles, 8th Duke of Noailles and Yolande Louise Marie Valentine d'Albert de Luynes (1870–1952). His maternal grandfather was Charles Honoré Emmanuel d'Albert de Luynes, 9th Duke of Luynes, and Yolande Françoise Marie Julienne de La Rochefoucauld (a granddaughter of Prince Jules de Polignac, the 7th Prime Minister of France).

He succeeded to the subsidiary title Duke of Ayen, but he and his son Adrien did not outlive his father, the 8th Duke of Noailles. The Dukedom of Noailles therefore passed to a cousin, François, 9th Duke of Noailles, though the château de Maintenon was inherited by his daughter Geneviève.

=== Resistance and imprisonment ===
He was a member of the French Resistance, arrested by the Gestapo on 22 January 1942 as a result of an anonymous denunciation. He was tortured and interned at the Paris Gestapo headquarters on Avenue Foch and then in Compiègne, and then deported successively to Buchenwald, Flossenburg, Oranienburg, and finally Bergen-Belsen, where he died a few days before the end of the war. In 1952, the Paris military court sentenced Suzanne Provost, a Gestapo collaborator accused of having denounced Jean de Noailles, to twenty years of imprisonment.

== Personal life ==
On 16 June 1919, he married Solange Marie Christine Louise de Labriffe (also known as Solange d'Ayen; 1898–1976) in Paris. Together they had two children:

- Geneviève Hélène Anne Marie Yolande de Noailles (1921–1998), who married Jean Gaston Amaury Raindre (b. 1924) in New York in 1947.
- Adrien Maurice Edmond Marie Camille de Noailles (1925–1944), who died in Rupt-sur-Moselle.

As he predeceased his father and did not have male issue, upon his father's death in 1953, his cousin François de Noailles succeeded to the dukedom of Noailles.

== Legacy ==
In October 1945, the Cannes municipal council decided to rename Avenue Bellevue to Avenue Jean de Noailles.

French nobility
Preceded by Adrien-Maurice-Victurnien-Mathieu	Duke of Ayen; 1895–1945	Succeeded by François
