= Emmanuel Henri Victurnien de Noailles =

French diplomat

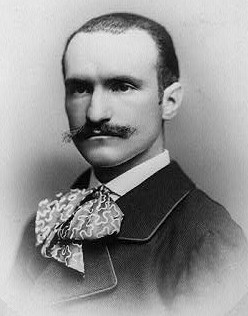
Circa 1872

Emmanuel-Henri-Victurnien, marquis de Noailles (September 15, 1830 – February 16, 1909), was a French diplomat, historian and literary critic, the second son of Paul de Noailles.

He was the second son of Paul de Noailles. The marquis de Noailles served as envoy to the United States in 1872, and was ambassador to Italy in 1873, to the Ottoman Empire from 1882 until 1886 and to Germany from 1896 to 1902.

He received the Grand Cross of the order of Legion d'Honneur in 1902.

== Works ==
He wrote several works on Poland, including:

- La Pologne et ses frontières (Poland and Its Borders, 1863),
- La Poésie polonaise (Polish Poetry, 1866),
- Henri de Valois et la Pologne en 1572 (Henri de Valois and Poland in 1572, 1867).
