= Victurnien de Rochechouart, 10th Duke of Mortemart =

French general and politician (1752–1812)

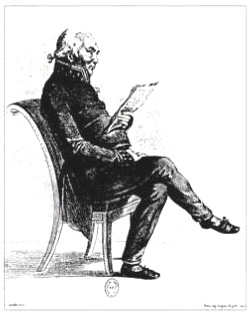

Victurnien de Rochechouart, 10th Duke of Mortemart (8 February 1752 in Everly – 4 July 1812 in Paris) was a French general and politician. He came from the Mortemart branch of the house of Rochechouart, named after the barony of Mortemart in Haute-Vienne, later raised to a marquisate and finally in December 1650 to a peer-duchy.

== Life ==
Victurnien Jean Baptiste was the second son of Jean-Victor de Rochechouart (1712–1771), duke of Mortemart and of Charlotte Nathalie de Manneville. In October 1768 he joined the artillery school in Strasbourg. On 20 March 1774 he was made colonel of the régiment de Lorraine-Infanterie, later rising to brigadier of infantry on 1 January 1784 and maréchal-de-camp on 9 March 1788.

After taking part in the second Assembly of Notables and supporting Protestants' claims in the parlement (where he appeared as a peer), on 24 March 1789 he was elected a noble deputy for the bailliage of Sens in the Estates General of 1789. There he supported Jacques Necker's plans, but opposed the reforms demanded by the majority of the assembly – he notably protested against the suppression of the rights of péage and minage. He resigned on 20 April 1790 and left France the following year. He fought with the royalist army in the 1792 campaign and then moved to England, where he was welcomed by George III with "kindness" and "distinction".

Commanding the régiment de Mortemart (a French émigré corps in British pay), de Mortemart returned to continental Europe in autumn 1794 and the following year joined the force which landed on Guernsey. In 1796 he moved to Portugal, where he served until 1802. His regiment was disbanded at the Peace of Amiens and de Mortemart returned to France "where he lived peacefully". Napoleon I made him a member of the conseil général for the Seine department on 26 March 1812, but he died suddenly in July that year from a vicious fever.

De Mortemart was also a man of letters, leaving behind several unedited works "of a superior quality", such as a poem on the theme of Joseph in Egypt and a verse translation of John Milton's Paradise Lost, along with several tales and light poems.

== Ancestry, marriage and issue ==
He married twice:

- On 11 June 1772, to Anne-d'Harcourt (8 March 1753 – 11 April 1778), only daughter of François-Henri (1726–1800), duke of Harcourt, peer of France, lieutenant-général des armées du roi, governor of the province of Normandy, knight of the Order of the Holy Spirit, and of Françoise-Catherine-Scholastique d'Aubusson. They had four children:
1. Anne-Victurnienne-Henriette (Paris, 7 May 1773 – Dülmen, 10 July 1806) – on 10 January 1789 she married Auguste-Philippe-Louis-Emmanuel, duke of Croÿ (1765–1822), peer of France, Prince of the Holy Roman Empire, grandee of Spain first class etc., with whom she had issue;
2. Nathalie Henriette Victurnienne (23 June 1774 – 1824), dame du palais (1809–1814) to empress Marie Louise – in 1792 she married Marc Étienne de Beauvau, Prince of Craon (1773–1849), with whom she had issue;
3. Catherine Victurienne Victorine (Paris, 4 June 1776 – Paris, 15 July 1809) – on 19 January 1807, she married Adrien François de Crussol (1778–1837), duke of Crussol, with whom she had issue;
4. Aimé-Amable-Victurnien (4 April 1778 – 18 April 1778);
- on 28 December 1782, to Adélaïde-Pauline-Rosalie de Cossé-Brissac (23 January 1765 – 2 May 1820), only daughter of Louis Hercule Timoléon de Cossé, Duke of Brissac, and of Adélaïde-Diane-Hortense-Délie Mancini, daughter of the duke of Nivernais, with whom he had five children:
1. Aimeri Jules Victurnien (30 January 1785 – 14 February 1785);
2. Casimir Louis Victurnien (20 March 1787 – 1 January 1875), 10th Duke of Mortemart, peer of France – on 26 May 1810, he married Virginie de Sainte-Aldegonde (1789–1878), with whom he had issue;
3. Emma Nathalie Victurnienne (Château d'Éverly, 7 May 1790 – Neauphle-le-Vieux, August 1824) – on 10 May 1810, she married at the château d'Éverly, to Raymond-François de Beauvilliers (1790–1811), duke of Saint-Aignan, with whom she had issue;
4. Antonie Louise Victurnienne (1792 – Paris, 30 January 1848) – on 2 November 1813, she married Charles de Forbin, marquis of Janson (1783–1849), with whom she had issue.
5. Alice Elfrida Victurnienne (10 July 1800 – Paris, 16 November 1887) – in 1823 she married Paul, Duke of Noailles (1802–1885), with whom she had an issue.
