= Adrien Maurice de Noailles, 3rd Duke of Noailles =

French Royal Army officer (1678–1766)

Marshal of France Adrien Maurice de Noailles Duke of Noailles
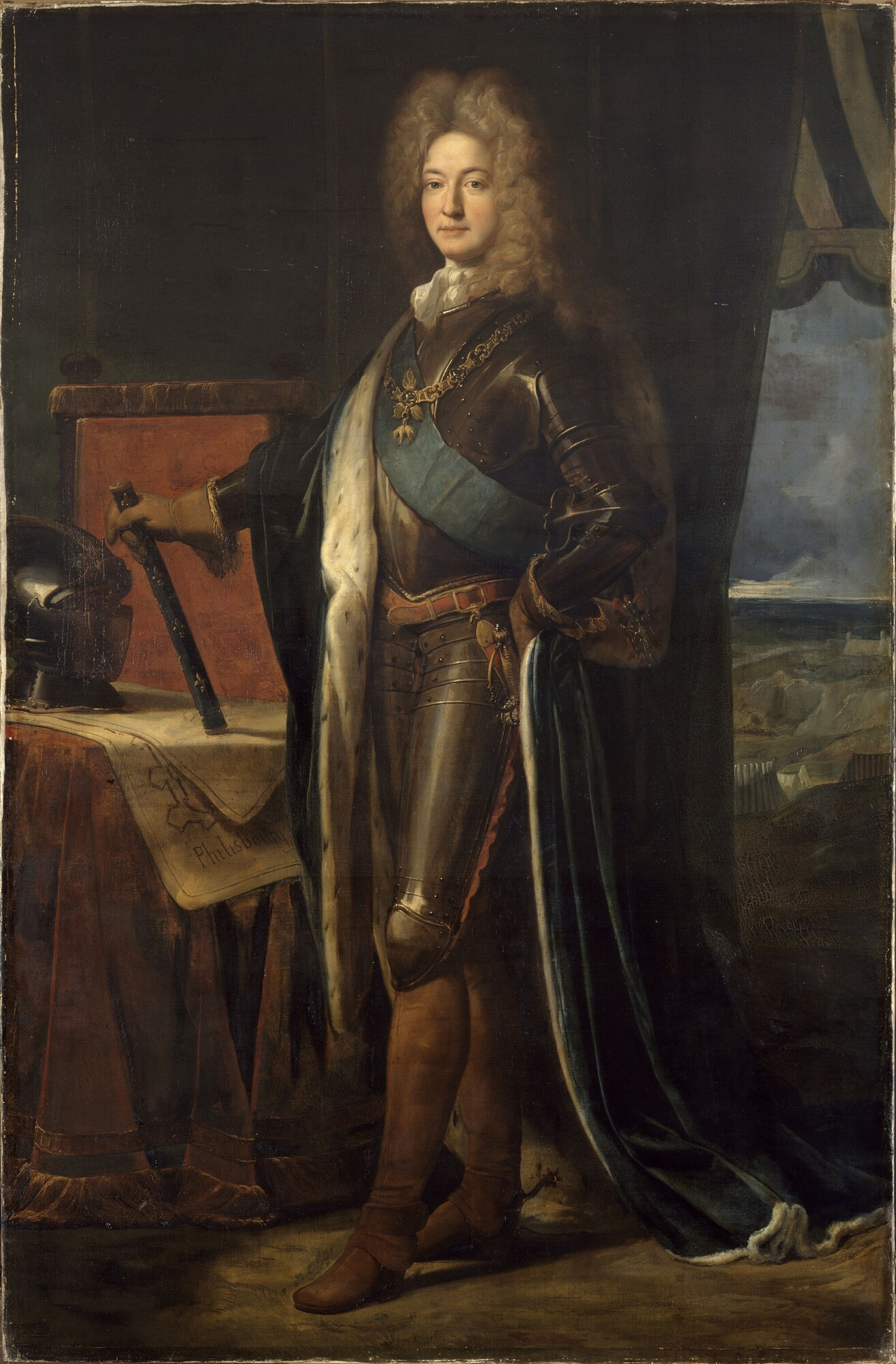
- Portrait by Éloi Firmin Féron, 1834 copy of an earlier work
- Born: 29 September 1678; France
- Died: 24 June 1766 (aged 87); France
- Noble family: Noailles
- Spouse: Françoise Charlotte Amable d'Aubigné
- Issue: Françoise Adélaide, Countess of Armagnac; Amable Gabrielle, Duchess of Villars; Marie Louise, Duchess of La Force; Louis, Duke of Noailles; Philippe, Count of Noailles; Marie Anne Françoise, Countess of Schleiden
- Father: Anne Jules, Duke of Noailles
- Mother: Marie-Françoise de Bournonville

Adrien Maurice de Noailles, 3rd Duke of Noailles
- Conflicts: War of the Spanish Succession; War of the Polish Succession; Siege of Philippsburg (1734); War of the Austrian Succession; Battle of Dettingen (1743); Siege of Menin (1744); Siege of Ypres (1744)

Adrien Maurice de Noailles, 3rd Duke of Noailles (29 September 1678 – 24 June 1766) was a French Royal Army officer.

== Biography ==
Son of Anne Jules de Noailles, he inherited the title duc de Noailles on his father's death in 1708.

He fought in the War of the Spanish Succession (1710–1713) during which the forces under his command on 24–26 July 1710 drove back a British attack on Sète. He was president of the Finance Council from 1715 to 1718. He distinguished himself in the War of the Polish Succession (1733–1738) and was made a marshal of France in 1734, becoming dean of the marshals in 1748.

He served in the War of the Austrian Succession and was appointed to command the French forces in March 1743. He was defeated at the Battle of Dettingen in June 1743, but successfully drove the Austrians out of Alsace-Lorraine the following year, although he missed an opportunity to seriously damage the Austrian army as it was crossing the Rhine.

The duc de Noailles was Foreign Minister from April to November 1744, and regarded Great Britain as a greater enemy of France than Austria. He later acted in a diplomatic capacity and had substantial influence over the course of foreign policy.

== Family ==
In 1698, as comte d'Ayen, he married Françoise Charlotte Amable d'Aubigné, niece and beneficiary of the marquise de Maintenon, and by her had six children, 4 daughters and 2 sons. His two sons Louis, 4th duc de Noailles, and Philippe, duc de Mouchy, also went on to become marshals of France.

The duc de Noailles was made a knight of the Order of the Golden Fleece in 1702, a Grandee of Spain in 1711, and a Knight of the Order of Saint-Esprit in 1724.

=== Issue ===
1. Françoise Adélaide de Noailles (1 September 1704 – January 1776) married Charles de Lorraine in 1717, son of Louis, Count of Armagnac and had no issue; divorced in 1721;
2. Amable-Gabrielle de Villars (18 February 1706 – September 1742), lady in waiting to the queen; married Honoré Armand de Villars and had one daughter, Amable Angélique de Villars; Amable Angélique may have been the daughter of le chevalier d'Orléans, whose mistress was Amable Gabrielle;
3. Marie Louise de Noailles (8 September 1710 – 22 May 1782), married Jacques Nompar de Caumont, Duke of La Force and divorced in 1742; had no issue;
4. Louis de Noailles, Duke of Ayen, Duke of Noailles (21 April 1713 – 22 August 1793), married Catherine Françoise Charlotte de Cossé-Brissac and had issue;
5. Philippe de Noailles, Count of Noailles Duke of Mouchy (27 December 1715 – 27 June 1794), married the famous Madame Étiquette and had issue; wife was a Lady-in-waiting to Marie Antoinette; Louis and his wife were executed in the Revolution;
6. Marie Anne Françoise de Noailles (12 January 1719 – 29 June 1793), married in 1744 Ludwig Engelbert de La Marck (1701–1773), Count of Schleiden.

French nobility
Preceded by Anne-Jules	Duke of Noailles; 1708–1766	Succeeded by Louis
Political offices
Preceded by Jean-Jacques Amelot de Chaillou	Foreign Minister of France; 26 April 1744 – 19 November 1744	Succeeded by René Louis de Voyer de Paulmy d'Argenson
