= Jean de Noailles, 5th Duke of Noailles =

French nobleman and scientist (1739–1824)

Jean de Noailles
- Duke of Noailles
- Born: Jean Louis Paul François de Noailles; 26 October 1739
- Died: 20 October 1824 (aged 84)
- Spouses: Henriette Anne Louise d'Aguesseau (m. 1755; died 1794) Baroness Wilhelmine Justine of Mosheim (m. 1796)
- Issue: Adrien Paul Louis; Anne Jeanne Baptiste Louise; Marie Adrienne, Marquise of La Fayette; Françoise Antoinette Louise; Anne Paule Dominique; Angélique Françoise d'Assise Rosalie; Louis Gabriel
- Father: Louis, 4th duc de Noailles
- Mother: Catherine Françoise Charlotte de Cossé-Brissac

Jean de Noailles, 5th Duke of Noailles (Jean Louis Paul François; 26 October 1739, Paris – 20 October 1824) was a French nobleman and scientist.

== Early life ==
Jean-Louis-Paul-François de Noailles was the son of Catherine de Cossé-Brissac and Louis, 4th duc de Noailles, a Marshal of France in 1775. His father was a nephew of Marie Victoire de Noailles, daughter-in-law of Louis XIV, and his paternal grandmother, Françoise Charlotte d'Aubigné, was a niece of Madame de Maintenon.

He was in the army for a period. However, his eminence as a chemist gained him the election as a member of the Académie des sciences in 1777. He was also a Knight of Golden Fleece.

He became Duc d'Ayen in 1766 on his grandfather's death, and Duc de Noailles on his father's in 1793. Having emigrated in 1792, he lived in Switzerland until the Bourbon Restoration in 1814, when he took his seat as a Peer of France.

== French Revolution ==
As a member of the royal military the Duke was away from his estates during much of the French Revolution and was not present for the death of his father, upon which he became the Duc de Noailles. His absence spared him being arrested along with most of his relatives on orders of Robespierre in May 1794. On 22 July that year, his 70-year-old mother (the dowager Duchess Françoise de Noailles), his wife (the Duchess Anne-Louise-Henriette), their eldest daughter Louise (the Vicomte de Noaille, by virtue of marriage to her cousin Marc Antoine de Noaille), and their second daughter, Adrienne de La Fayette, were condemned to the guillotine. All were executed except for Adrienne, who was spared at the last moment due to intervention by the future American president, James Monroe (the then U.S. Minister to France), because of her husband's efforts for America during the American War for Independence) but only after her paternal grandmother, mother, and sister were beheaded within her sight. The Duke learned of their deaths weeks later. His family had lost many other members including two of his uncles (including Philippe de Noailles, duc de Mouchy) and numerous cousins and in-laws during the Revolution.

The Duke went into self-imposed exile in Switzerland until the Bourbon Restoration, returning to France and his ravaged estates after Napoleon and the Directory restored some order. Through the efforts of his daughter Adrienne de La Fayette, whose husband's family also suffered greatly in the Revolution, some part of his once immense fortune was restored.

== Personal life ==
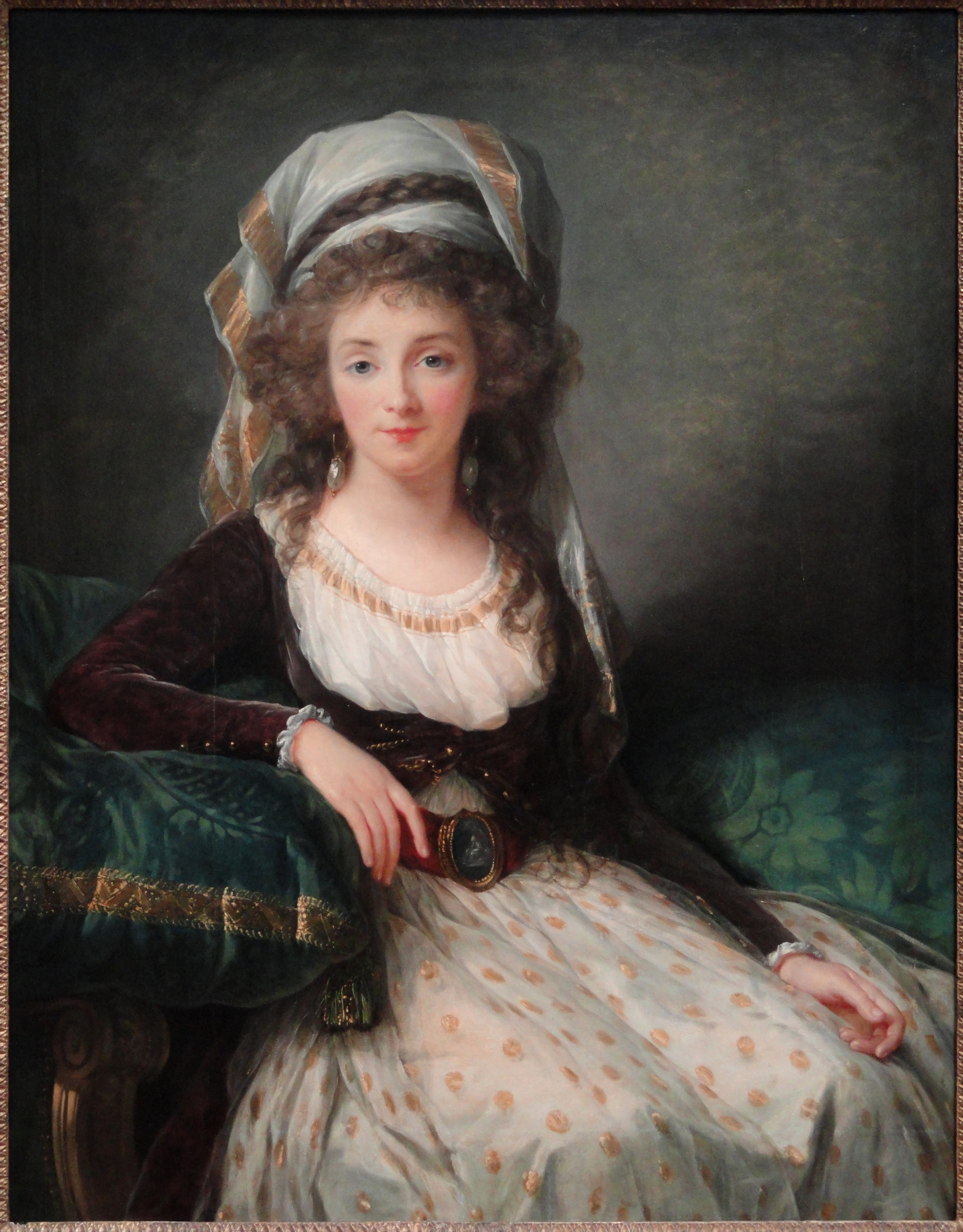
Portrait of his wife, the Duchess of Noailles, by Élisabeth Vigée Le Brun, 1789.

On 25 February 1755, he was married to heiress Henriette-Anne-Louise d'Aguesseau, the daughter of Jean Baptiste Paulin d'Aguesseau de Fresne, Count of Compans and of Maligny, and Anne Louise Françoise du Pré, Dame of la Grange-Bleneau. It was an arranged marriage, worked out by Adrien-Maurice, 3rd duc de Noailles, as Henriette was heiress to the fortune of her paternal grandfather, Henri François d'Aguesseau, a three-time Chancellor of France. Jean and Henriette lived at the family residence in Paris, the Hôtel de Noailles on Rue Saint-Honoré, and were the parents of eight children:

- Adrien Paul Louis de Noailles (1756–1757), who died in infancy.
- Anne Jeanne Baptiste Louise de Noailles (1758–1794), who married her cousin the Louis-Marie, the Vicomte de Noailles.
- Marie-Adrienne-Françoise de Noailles (Nov. 2,1759–1807), who married Gilbert Du Motier, Marquis de Lafayette.
- A daughter (born and died 11 December 1760), who died upon birth.
- Françoise Antoinette Louise de Noailles (1763–1788), who became the Comtesse de Thezan du Pourjol.
- Anne Paule Dominique de Noailles (June 22, 1766 – 1839), who became the Marquise de Pouzols, Marquise de Montagu.
- Angélique Françoise d'Assise Rosalie de Noailles (1767–1833), who became the Marquise de Grammont.
- Louis Gabriel de Noailles (1768–1770), who died in infancy.

Although the Duke remarried in 1796 to the Baroness Wilhelmine Justine of Mosheim (Yury Golovkin's mother), he had no further children and was survived by only two of his eight children. Having no surviving sons and having survived his nephews, he was succeeded as Duc de Noailles by his then 22 year old grandnephew, Paul de Noailles.

French nobility
Preceded by Louis	Duke of Noailles; 1793–1824	Succeeded by Paul
Preceded by Louis	Duke of Ayen; 1766–1793	Succeeded by Paul
