= Adrienne de La Fayette =

French noblewoman, wife of the Marquis de Lafayette (1759-1807)

Adrienne de Noailles
- Marquise de La Fayette
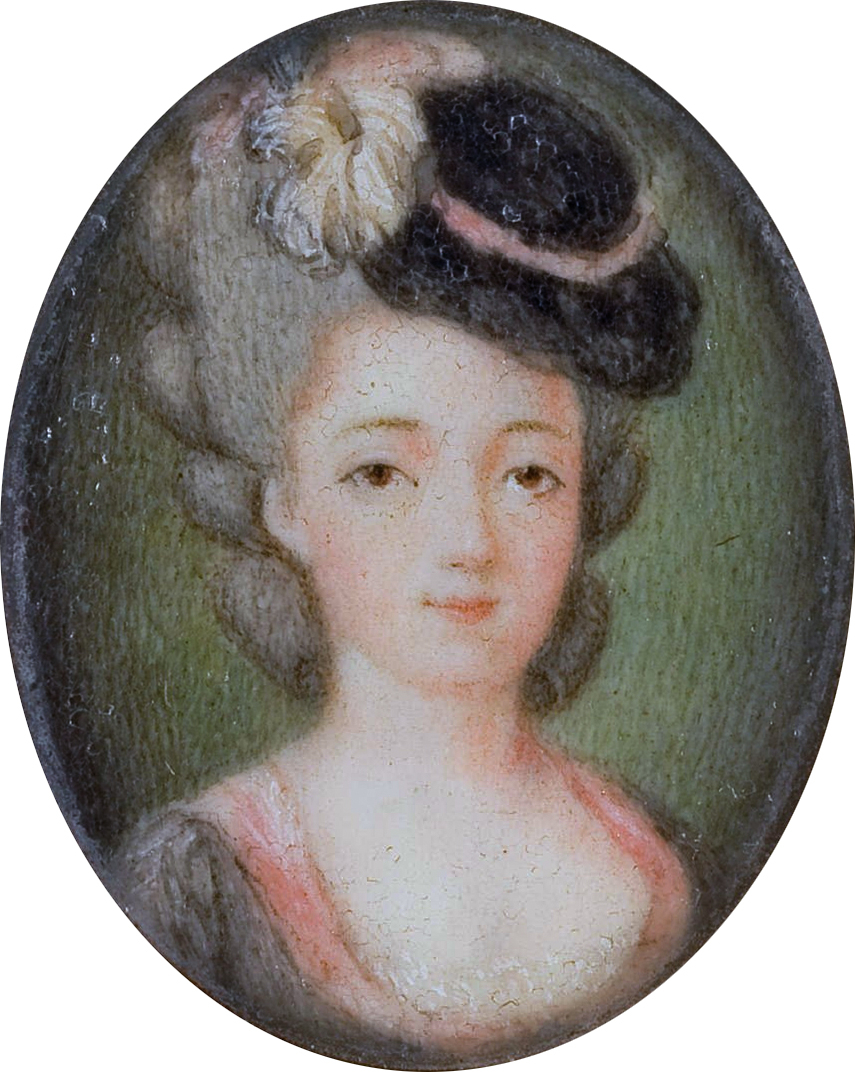
- Born: 2 November 1759; Hôtel de Noailles, Paris, Kingdom of France
- Died: 25 December 1807 (aged 48); Auvergne, First French Empire
- Spouse: Gilbert du Motier, Marquis de Lafayette (m. 1774)
- Issue: Henriette du Motier; Anastasie Louise Pauline du Motier; Georges Washington Louis Gilbert du Motier; Marie Antoinette Virginie du Motier
- Father: Jean de Noailles
- Mother: Henriette Anne Louise d'Aguesseau

Marie Adrienne Françoise de Noailles, Marquise de La Fayette (2 November 1759 – 25 December 1807), was a French noblewoman best known for being the spouse of Gilbert du Motier, Marquis de La Fayette. Born to Jean de Noailles, 5th Duke of Noailles and Henriette Anne Louise d'Aguesseau, she was by birth a member of the House of Noialles, one of the most important noble families in Limousin in the 18th century. On 11 April 1774, she married the young Marquis de La Fayette, who left France in 1776 to volunteer in the American Revolutionary War where he served under General George Washington, then later became a key figure in the French Revolution of 1789.

== Early life and family ==
The Marquis and Marquise had four children, one of whom died in infancy, and nine grandchildren:

1. Henriette du Motier (15 December 1775 – 3 October 1777), who died in infancy.
2. Anastasie Louise Pauline du Motier (1 July 1777 – 24 February 1863), who married Juste Charles César de Fay and had one daughter: Adrienne Jenny Florimonde de la Tour Maubourg (1812-1897), who married Conte Ettore Perrone di San Martino
3. Georges Washington Louis Gilbert du Motier, (24 December 1779 – 29 November 1849), who married Émilie Destutt de Tracy and had five children: Nathalie (1803), Charlotte (1805), Clémentine (1809), Oscar (1815) and Edmond (1818).
4. Marie Antoinette Virginie du Motier (17 September 1782 – 23 July 1849), who married Louis de Lasteyrie du Saillant and had three children: Mélanie (1809), Jules (1810) and Adrienne-Octavie (1813).

She was a great-granddaughter of Françoise Charlotte d'Aubigné, niece of Madame de Maintenon.

== Imprisonment and planned execution ==
In 1792, the Marquise de LaFayette was placed under house arrest. Then on November 13, 1793 she was arrested and taken to an improvised jail in Brioude. She was moved to a prison in Paris on June 10, 1794, facing execution. Elizabeth Monroe, a future First Lady of the United States and wife to James Monroe, the United States envoy to France, intervened in an attempt to save her. The day prior to La Fayette's scheduled execution, Mrs. Monroe visited the imprisoned marquise and loudly announced that she would be returning the following day. Not wanting to endanger ties with the United States, France abruptly reversed its verdict and did not execute her.

== Austria ==
In 1795, the Marquise de LaFayette traveled to Austria with her daughters Anastasie and Virginie where her husband, the Marquis de LaFayette, was imprisoned. She personally pleaded with Emperor Francis I for his freedom without success. She and her daughters were allowed, however, to join him in captivity. While in prison, she became ill and never fully recovered. She left with her husband and daughters in 1797 after losses against Napoleon forced Austria to release French prisoners.

== Death ==
The Marquise de LaFayette died on 25 December 1807 and is buried in the Picpus Cemetery in the 12th arrondissement of Paris. This cemetery also contains a mass grave where several of the Marquise's relatives were buried after being guillotined.
