= Paul de Noailles, 6th Duke of Noailles =

French nobleman

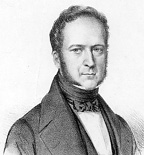
Paul, 6th duc de Noailles

Paul de Noailles, 6th Duke of Noailles (4 January 1802 – 29 May 1885) was a French nobleman and historian.

He was the grandnephew of the heirless Jean-Paul-François de Noailles, 5th Duke of Noailles, and succeeded him as Duke of Noailles on the latter's death in 1824, although he did not take his seat among the peers of France until his majority in 1827. A Knight of the Golden Fleece, he was also noted as a writer and parliamentary orator.

The Duke of Noailles was elected to succeed his friend and confidant Chateaubriand to the Académie Française on 11 January 1849 with twenty five votes out of thirty one. As Honoré de Balzac at that time obtained only four votes, this development occasioned an outburst of protest in the literary press. With the duc Pasquier and the duc de Broglie, the duc de Noailles formed the "parti des ducs" (dukes' party).

He was elected a member of the American Antiquarian Society in 1856.

== Family ==
He was married on 5 February 1823 to Alice de Rochechouart-Mortemart, daughter of Victurnien de Rochechouart, 8th duc de Mortemart, and had three children:

1. Pauline-Victurnienne de Noailles
2. Jules-Charles-Victurnien, 7th duc de Noailles
3. Emmanuel-Henri-Victurnien, marquis de Noailles

French nobility
| Preceded by Jean-Paul-François | Duke of Noailles; 1824–1885 | Succeeded by Jules-Charles-Victurnien |
| Preceded by Jean-Paul-François | Duke d'Ayen; 1793–1824 | Succeeded by Jules-Charles-Victurnien |
