= Duke of Noailles =

French noble title

Dukedom of Noailles
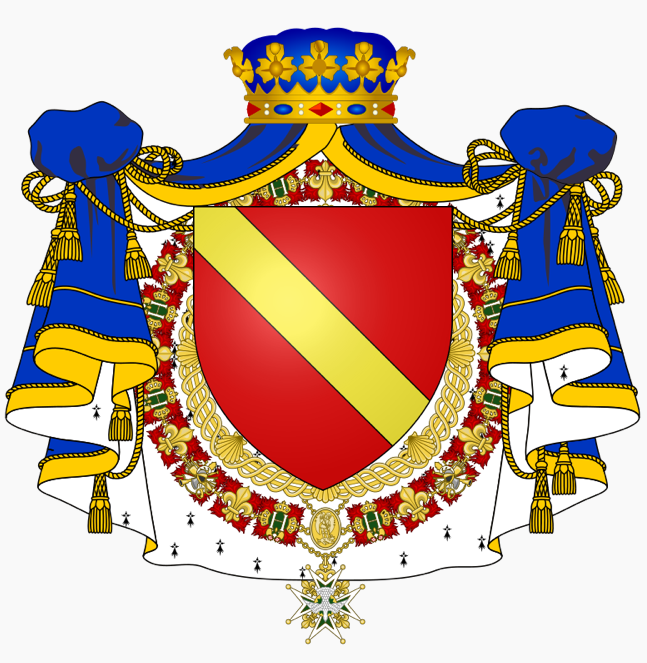
- Coat of arms of the Dukes of Noailles as peers of France
- Creation date: 1663
- Created by: Louis XIV
- Peerage: France
- First holder: Anne de Noailles
- Present holder: Hélie de Noailles

The title of Duke of Noailles is a French peerage created in 1663 for Anne de Noailles, Count of Ayen.

== History ==
Noailles is the name of a prominent French noble family, derived from the castle of Noailles in the territory of Ayen, between Brive and Turenne in Limousin, and claiming to date back to the 11th century. The family did not obtain fame until the 16th century, when its head, Antoine de Noailles (1504–1562), became admiral of France and was ambassador in England during three important years (1553–1556), maintaining a gallant but unsuccessful rivalry with the Spanish ambassador, Simon Renard. Henri de Noailles (1554–1623), son of Antoine, was a commander in the religious wars and was made comte d'Ayen by Henry IV of France in 1593.

Anne de Noailles (died 1678), the grandson of the first count, played an important part in the Fronde and the early years of the reign of Louis XIV, became captain-general of the newly won province of Roussillon, and in 1663 was made Duke of Noailles and a peer of France.

The sons of the first duke raised the family to its greatest fame. The eldest son, Anne Jules de Noailles (1650–1708), was one of the chief generals of France towards the end of the reign of Louis XIV. After raising the regiment of Noailles in 1689, he commanded in Spain during the War of the Spanish Succession and was made Marshal of France in 1693. A younger son, Louis Antoine de Noailles (1651–1729), was in 1695 made archbishop of Paris and hence also Duke of Saint-Cloud and peer of France in his own right, holding these high dignities until his death; he was made a cardinal in 1699.

The name of Noailles continued to be prominent throughout the 18th century. Adrien Maurice (1678–1766), the third duke, served in all the most important wars of the reign of Louis XV in Italy and Germany, and became a marshal in 1734. His last command was in the War of the Austrian Succession, when he was beaten by the English at the battle of Dettingen in 1743. He married Françoise Charlotte d'Aubigné, a niece of Madame de Maintenon, and two of his sons also attained the rank of Marshal of France.

The elder son of Adrien Maurice, Louis (1713–1793), who bore the title of "duc d'Ayen" (title created in 1737 and since then used for the heir apparent of the Duke of Noailles) until his father's death in 1766, when he became Duke of Noailles, served in most of the wars of the 18th century without particular distinction, but was nevertheless made a marshal in 1775. He refused to emigrate during the Revolution, but escaped the guillotine by dying in August 1793, before the Terror reached its height. On the 4th Thermidor (July 22), the aged duchesse de Noailles was executed with her daughter-in-law, the duchesse d'Ayen, and her granddaughter, the vicomtesse de Noailles. His younger brother, Philippe (1715–1794), comte de Noailles, afterwards Duke of Mouchy, was a more distinguished soldier than his brother.

Jean Paul François (1739–1824), the fifth duke, was in the army, but his tastes were scientific, and for his eminence as a chemist he was elected a member of the Academy of Sciences in 1777. He became Duke of Ayen in 1766 on his grandfather's death, and Duke of Noailles on his father's in 1793. Having emigrated in 1792, he lived in Switzerland until the Restoration in 1814, when he took his seat as a peer of France.

He had no son, and was succeeded as Duke of Noailles by his grand-nephew, Paul (1802–1885), who won some reputation as an author and who became a member of the French Academy in the place of Chateaubriand in 1849. The grandfather of Paul de Noailles, and brother of the fifth duke, Emmanuel Marie Louis (1743–1822), marquis de Noailles, was ambassador at Amsterdam from 1770 to 1776, at London from 1776 to 1783, and at Vienna from 1783 to 1792.

== Dukes of Noailles (1663) ==
No.	From	To	Portrait	Duke of Noailles	Notes
1	1663	1678		Anne	Also Count of Ayen
2	1678	1708		Anne Jules	Also Marshal of France
3	1708	1766		Adrian Maurice	Also Marshal of France; married Françoise Charlotte d'Aubigné, niece of Madame de Maintenon.
4	1766	1793		Louis	Also Marshal of France
5	1793	1824		John Louis	
6	1824	1885		Paul	
7	1885	1895		Jules Charles	
8	1895	1953		Adrian Maurice	
9	1953	2009		Francis Agenor	
10	2009	present		Hélie Marie Auguste Jacques Bertrand Philippe	

== Other notable family members ==
Arms of the counts and dukes of Noailles (gules, a bend or)

- Antoine, 1st comte de Noailles (1504–1562), admiral of France
- Henri de Noailles (1554–1623)
- Louis-Antoine, Cardinal de Noailles (1651–1720), archbishop of Paris
- Philippe de Noailles, duc de Mouchy (1715–1794), Marshal of France, younger brother of Louis, 4th duc de Noailles and father of Louis-Marie, vicomte de Noailles and Philippe-Louis-Marc-Antoine de Noailles, 1st Duke of Mouchy
- Emmanuel-Marie-Louis, marquis de Noailles (1743–1822)
- Philippe-Louis-Marc-Antoine de Noailles, 1st duc de Mouchy (1752–1819)
- Louis-Marie, vicomte de Noailles (1756–1804), soldier and politician
- Marie Adrienne Françoise de Noailles (1759–1807), wife of Gilbert du Motier, marquis de Lafayette
- Emmanuel-Henri-Victurnien, marquis de Noailles (1830–1909), diplomat
- Anna de Noailles (1876–1933), writer, poet, and figure in Parisian high society. Wife of a son of the 7th Duke of Noailles.
- Charles de Noailles (1891–1981), son of the 10th Prince of Poix, and his wife Marie-Laure de Noailles (born Marie-Laure Henriette Anne Bischoffsheim; 1902–1970), patrons of the arts.

== See also ==
- Dukes of Mouchy (the cadet branch)
