= Anne Louise Marie de Beauvau =

- Princess of Poix
- Full name: Anne Louise Marie de Beauvau
- Born: 1 April 1750; Lunéville, Lorraine
- Died: 20 November 1834 (aged 84)
- Spouse: Philippe Louis de Noailles, Prince of Poix (9 September 1767)
- Issue: Charles Arthur, 3rd Duke of Mouchy; Just, 4th Duke of Mouchy
- Father: Charles Juste de Beauvau, 2nd Prince of Craon
- Mother: Marie Charlotte de La Tour d'Auvergne

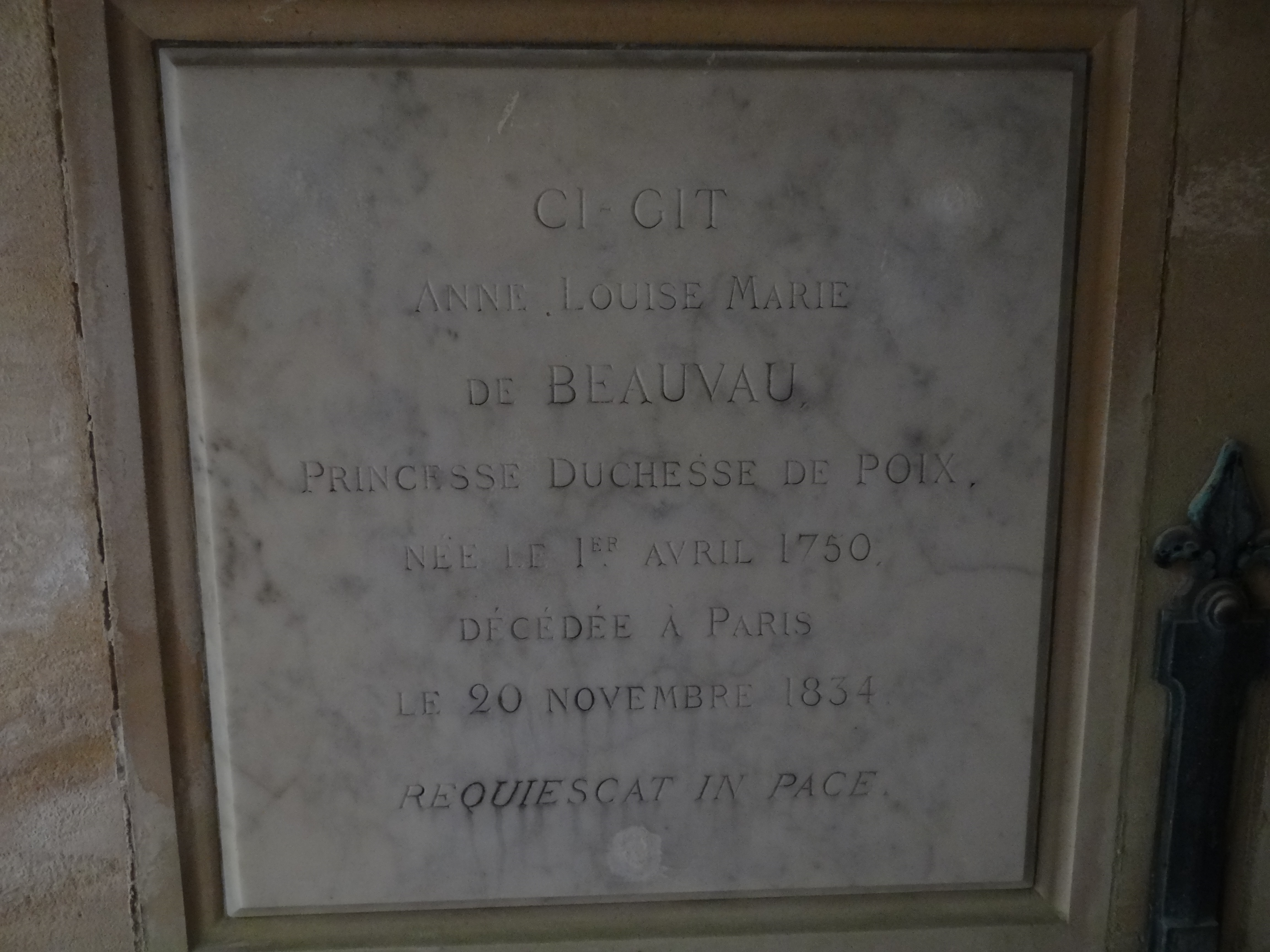
The tomb of Anne-Louise-Marie de Beauvau in the crypt of the Noailles family funerary chapel near the Church of Saint-Étienne in Mouchy-le-Châtel, Oise.

Anne Louise Marie de Beauvau (1 April 1750 – 20 November 1834) known as "Mademoiselle de Beauvau" was the only child of Charles Juste de Beauvau, Prince of Craon and Marie Charlotte de La Tour d'Auvergne. She was also a niece of society hostess, Madame de Boufflers In Paris, the Princess of Poix held a salon where she received all that was most brilliant within the society of the time and in particular the supporters of new ideas such as Gérard de Lally-Tollendal, the Abbé de Montesquiou, the Marquis de La Fayette, the Dukes of Luynes and Liancourt as well as for Mesdames d'Hénin, de Tessé, de Lauzun, de Simiane and Ossun.

== Background ==
Born in Lunéville, she grew up at the court of Stanisław Leszczyński, former King of Poland and sovereign Duke of Lorraine, where her family the House of Beauvau were among the most senior noble families in the Duchy of Lorraine. Described as an attractive girl, she was born with a leg weaker than the other which worsened with age, leaving her lame in later life. While being educated at the prestigious Port-Royal-des-Champs, she befriended several people who would remain close to her throughout her life, including Mademoiselle de Poyenne later Duchess of Sully, Amélie de Boufflers, later Duchess of Lauzun, and Geneviève de Gramont, later Countess of Ossun. Devastated by her mother's death in 1763 her grief was worsened by her father quickly marrying his mistress Marie Charlotte Sylvie de Rohan-Chabot the following year.

== Marriage ==
On 9 September 1767 she married Philippe Louis de Noailles, prince of Poix, nicknamed "le petit Poix" due to his short stature. The Prince of Poix was a son of Philippe de Noailles, Duke of Mouchy and Anne d'Arpajon. Four years after her marriage and aged 21, she gave birth to Charles. In 1777 she gave birth to her second child Just, but the pregnancy did not go as well as the first. She fell ill and her disability worsened and she lost the complete use of one of her legs. As a result she threw herself into society, preferring to cultivate herself even more and gather her friends with her. She espoused new ideas and showed herself to be a fervent admirer of La Fayette and Necker.

== Children ==
1. Charles Arthur de Noailles, 3rd Duke of Mouchy (14 February 1771 2 February 1834) married Nathalie de Laborde.
2. Just de Noailles, 4th Duke of Mouchy (22 August 1777 – 1 August 1846) married Mélanie de Talleyrand-Périgord.

== French Revolution ==
Though she and her husband embraced new liberal idea, their proximity to the royal family caused them to kreep their views quiet. Despite their silence, the Prince's correspondence with King Louis XVI was intercepted and he along with his wife, were arrested. Due to her physical disability, she was allowed to remain in Paris under house arrest accompanied by her youngest son. Her husband fled to England while she remained living in Paris.

After 18 Brumaire, the prince returned to France and the princess recovered part of her personal fortune before In 1803, then aged 84, the princess very advantageously married her second son Just to Mélanie de Talleyrand-Périgord, niece of Talleyrand.

== First French Empire ==
The Poix lived quietly during the period of the Empire and the prince remained outside of all political activity. Just was named Chamberlain in 1806 thanks to Talleyrand, whose niece he had married, Dame du Palais to the Empress.

The Restoration was welcomed as a deliverance after the sad last years of the Empire and the losses it caused (death of the Viscount of Noailles etc.) On the return of the Bourbons, the prince was appointed lieutenant general and resumed his duties as captain of the King's bodyguards. On 4 June 1814 he was named a Peer of France and promoted two months later to Lieutenant-General of the kingdom.

== Titles ==
- 1 April 1750 - 9 September 1767 Mademoiselle de Beauvau
- 9 September 1767 - 17 February 1819 The Princess of Poix.
- 17 February 1819 - 20 November 1834 The Dowager Princess of Poix.
