= Jean François de Saint-Lambert =

French poet, philosopher and military officer (1716–1803)

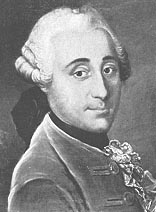
- Born: 26 December 1716; Nancy, Kingdom of France
- Died: 9 February 1803 (aged 86); Paris, France
- Title: Marquis de Saint-Lambert
- Partner(s): Émilie du Châtelet; Sophie d'Houdetot
- Children: Stanislas-Adélaïde du Châtelet (4 September 1749 — 6 May 1751)

Jean François de Saint-Lambert (French: [ʒɑ̃ fʁɑ̃swa də sɛ̃ lɑ̃bɛʁ]; 26 December 1716 – 9 February 1803) was a French poet, philosopher and military officer.

== Biography ==
Saint-Lambert was born at Nancy and raised on his parents' estate at Affracourt, a village in Lorraine near Haroué, a seat of the Beauvau family, with whom he had close ties. He studied at the university at Pont-à-Mousson, but then spent several years at home recovering from an unidentified illness. He often complained of poor health, but participated in military campaigns, led a strenuous social life, and lived to be 86 years old.

Saint-Lambert began writing poetry in his adolescence and belonged to Françoise de Graffigny's social circle in Lunéville. By October 1733 he had already begun work on The Seasons, his major poetical work, which did not appear in print until 1769 (see 1769 in poetry). All his life, he read his works in salons and to his friends, but did not rush to publish them.

In 1739, Saint-Lambert joined the Heudicourt regiment in the Lorraine Guards, in which his boyhood friend, Charles-Just, prince de Beauvau-Craon, was already a colonel, despite being only 19 years old. For much of the 1740s the two men fought side by side in the Italian campaigns of the War of the Austrian Succession.

Saint-Lambert spent the winter quarter in Lunéville in 1745–46, and according to François-Antoine Devaux, he became at that time the lover of the Marquise de Boufflers. She was a sister of the prince de Beauvau, and the mistress of Stanislaus Leszczynski, who had been established in 1737 as duke of Lorraine.

Over the winter of 1747–48, Voltaire and his entourage took up residence in Lunéville. Saint-Lambert soon began a liaison with the great writer's mistress, Émilie du Châtelet. She was in her forties, and had had many lovers, but succumbed to a mad passion for Saint-Lambert and became pregnant with their child. The baby, a girl named Stanislas-Adélaïde Du Châtelet, was born on 4 September 1749 in what at first seemed an easy delivery; but Émilie contracted a fever and died on 10 September. The infant died in Lunéville on 6 May 1751.

Émilie was a brilliant and learned woman, known all over Europe for her translation of Newton. Her love affair and pregnancy created scandal and inspired satirical mirth; her death was a shock to everyone. Voltaire was shattered, and according to his friend Devaux, so was Saint-Lambert, who nonetheless moved to Paris around 1750 and to all appearances soon recovered from his grief.

It was at this time that he gave himself the title Marquis de Saint-Lambert, to which he had no right; it was once claimed that he was not even of noble birth, but the evidence refuting that charge was published long ago.

In 1752 he began the second of his two famous love affairs, with Sophie d'Houdetot. This relationship became noteworthy because in 1757, while Saint-Lambert was away on military duty in the Seven Years' War, Jean-Jacques Rousseau suddenly conceived a mad passion for Sophie, which he wrote about in his Confessions. In Rousseau's mind, she became identified with a character in the great novel he was then writing, Julie, ou la Nouvelle Héloïse. In the end, Sophie turned Rousseau away, saying that she loved Saint-Lambert. She and Saint-Lambert remained together as a couple until his death in 1803, spending their last years in a cordial ménage à trois with her husband.

Saint-Lambert resigned from the army in 1758 and devoted the rest of his life to literature. He wrote several articles for Diderot's Encyclopédie, published an essay on "Luxury" in 1764, brought out an edition of The Seasons with a selection of his other poetry and some short stories in 1769, and completed a multi-volume philosophical work in 1797–98, called Principe des mœurs chez toutes les nations ou Catéchisme universel (Principle of morals among all nations, or universal catechism). He wrote the section on "Siam", and most likely also other parts of the first edition of Guillaume Thomas François Raynals L'Histoire philosophique et politique des établissements et du commerce des Européens dans les deux Indes. He was elected to the Académie française in 1770.

He and Sophie outlived most of their contemporaries, however, and around 1800 members of a new generation wrote about them as relics of a legendary past. Count Louis-Mathieu Molé described the fabled lover as "a little old man dressed in a hideous cotton dressing gown with a pattern of blue stripes and red bouquets, a wispy cotton bonnet on his head, using a cane walking stick with a gold knob as tall as he was to support his wobbly steps." Chateaubriand used the couple as symbols of a discredited era, when he wrote that they "both represented the opinions and the freedoms of a by-gone age, carefully stuffed and preserved: it was the eighteenth century expired and married in its manner. It was sufficient to remain steadfast in one's life for illegitimacies to become legitimacies."
