= Anne de Noailles (1729–1794) =

French noblewoman and court official (1729–1794)

Anne d'Arpajon
- Countess of Noailles
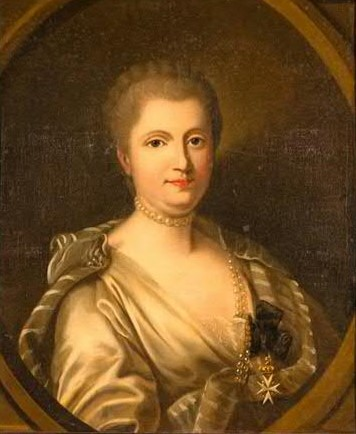
- Full name: Anne Claude Louise d'Arpajon
- Born: 4 March 1729; Arpajon, France
- Died: 27 June 1794 (aged 65); Barrière du Trône, Paris, France
- Spouses: Philippe de Noailles, Duke of Mouchy (m. 1741)
- Issue: Louise Charlotte de Noailles; Philippe Louis, Duke of Mouchy; Louis Marc Antoine, Viscount Noailles
- Father: Louis de Sévérac
- Mother: Anne Charlotte le bas de Montargis

Anne d'Arpajon, comtesse de Noailles (born Anne Claude Louise; 4 March 1729 – 27 June 1794) was a French noblewoman and court official. She served as the dame d'honneur of two Queens of France, Marie Leszczyńska and Marie Antoinette. She was called "Madame Etiquette" by Marie Antoinette for her insistence that the minutiae of court etiquette could never be altered or disregarded.

== Early life ==
Anne d'Arpajon was the daughter of Louis de Sévérac, Marquis of Arpajon-sur-Cère (1667–1736), and Anne Charlotte Le Bas de Montargis. Her father purchased the Marquisat of Saint-Germain-lès-Châtres in 1720 and was granted permission by Philippe d'Orléans (Regent for Louis XV), to rename it Saint-Germain-lès-Arpajon, and its seat as Arpajon. Her mother was a lady-in-waiting to Marie Louise Élisabeth d'Orléans, daughter of the regent.

Anne Claude married Philippe de Noailles, Duke of Mouchy, Captain of the Hunts at Versailles, on 27 November 1741, aged only twelve. Noailles was one of the leading families of France. While having the title duke of Mouchy and prince de Poix, he was known at court as the comte de Noailles.

== Courtier ==
In 1763, she was appointed dame d'honneur to queen Marie Leszczyńska, succeeding Marie Brûlart. She served until the death of the queen five years later. Her position made her the first in rank of all ladies-in-waiting at the French royal court. Her daughter Louise Henriette Charlotte Philippine de Noailles was appointed dame du palais.

Upon the death of the queen in 1768, she retained her position awaiting to be transferred to the equivalent position in the household of the new Dauphine of France, alongside the Dame d'atour, Amable-Gabrielle de Villars, and the rest of the ladies-in-waiting to the late queen. In the spring of 1770, they were dispatched to the border to welcome the new dauphine, Marie Antoinette of Austria, upon her arrival in France.

In April 1770, she and the rest of the Household of the Dauphine were introduced to Marie Antoinette by her husband Philippe de Noailles in the Pavilion of Kehl at Rhen. During the ceremony when the new crown princess was handed over from her Austrian to her French entourage, a famous scene allegedly took place, in which Marie Antoinette lost her composure, burst into tears and threw herself into the arms of the countess de Noailles, whose chilly response resulted in her regaining her composure.

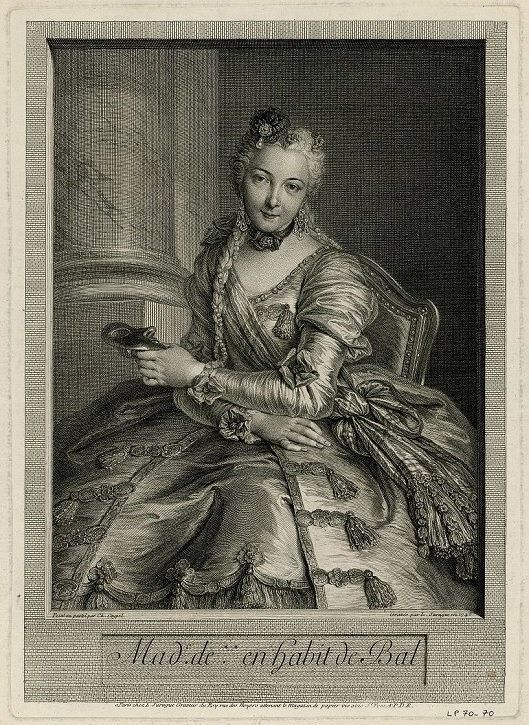
The Lady with the Mask by Louis Surugue, 1746

As dame d'honneur, Anne de Noailles was responsible for overseeing the behavior of Marie Antoinette and her ladies-in-waiting. She was tasked with instructing the future queen in the etiquette of the French royal court and ensuring her compliance. Early on, this role led to discord between de Noailles and Marie Antoinette, who resented the restrictions imposed on her life by court etiquette. During their journey from the border to a meeting with the king and the dauphin in the Forest of Compiègne, de Noailles in Nancy reproached Marie Antoinette for being overly familiar with her relatives from the House of Lorraine, reminding her that, as the dauphine, she should not treat the king's subjects as equals.

During the following years, Marie Antoinette shocked de Noailles by playing with the children of one of her ladies-in-waiting; she was also prevented by the countess from participating too much in the festivities at court, and, when playing masquerade with her brothers-in-law, was forced to hide the costumes and stop playing when de Noailles entered the room. Marie Antoinette reportedly made fun of de Noailles' adherence to etiquette and her reprimands of her staff, referring to her as Madame Etiquette. On one occasion, after falling off a mule in the Forest of Compiégne, Marie Antoinette laughingly asked her entourage to fetch de Noailles so that she could ask her for instructions on the correct etiquette for how a Dauphine of France should behave after having fallen off a mule.

Anne de Noailles was the first to greet Marie Antoinette as queen upon the death of Louis XV in 1774. When the queen reintroduced the old office of Surintendante de la Maison de la Reine and her favorite, the Princesse de Lamballe was appointed to that post, over ranking the post of dame d'honneur, Anne de Noailles resigned and was replaced by Laure-Auguste de Fitz-James, Princess de Chimay.

Her resignation was well received by the queen, whose lack of respect for the court protocol prompted de Noailles to become a part of the circle of the Kings' aunts, Mesdames de France, who gathered the noble opposition of the queen in protest toward her disregard for etiquette, which had replaced rank as the prerequisite to be a member of the queen's circle with her personal affection for favorites.

== French Revolution ==
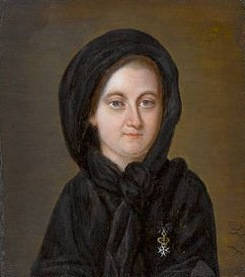
Anne comtesse de Noailles

During the French Revolution, Anne's two sons emigrated, and her eldest son was deemed an enemy of the state and a warrant was issued for his arrest by the government. Anne and her husband Philippe retired to their Chateau Mouchy-le-Châtel in Oise with their daughter in September 1792. On 25 August 1793, the de Noailles and their daughter were placed under house arrest on their estate in accordance with the decree against potential enemies of the state. Their daughter was transferred to Beauvais and Chantilly on 6 October, while they were initially allowed to remain in their home because of their age.

On 16 October, Anne and Philippe de Noailles were transferred to La Force Prison in Paris. In the warrant for their arrest, Philippe de Noailles was described as the father of an enemy of the state, while Anne de Noailles was included in the arrest simply in her capacity as his wife.

In La Force, however, prisoners were separated by gender, and the couple was transferred to Luxembourg Prison after having successfully asked to be moved to a prison where they could share a cell. They also asked that their daughter be transferred with them, but this was not granted. As with other prisoners, they were allowed to have servants and were waited upon by their maid Latour, who left descriptions of their imprisonment. They lived comfortably in prison and socialized with the other aristocratic prisoners, particularly the Duchess of Orléans. During their imprisonment, they were given a questionnaire, which was answered by Philippe de Noailles, and which Anne de Noailles also signed with the comment that she had never had any opinions other than those of her husband.

On 5 April 1794, they were joined by their daughter-in-law and niece Louise de Noailles (1758–1794), as well as her grandmother and mother, Catherine de Cossé-Brissac and Henriette Anne Louise d'Aguesseau, who were also the widow and daughter-in-law of Philippe's brother Louis, 4th duc de Noailles.

Anne and Philippe de Noailles were transferred to the Conciergerie, where they were put on trial before the tribunal. Philippe de Noailles was sentenced to death after being judged guilty of the charges of being an enemy agent and having supplied enemy émigrés and enemies of the state with funds. Anne de Noailles received the same sentence as an accomplice of her husband.

Anne and her husband Philippe were guillotined on 27 June 1794. On 22 July 1794, their daughter-in-law Louise de Noailles, as well as their sister-in-law and niece, Catherine de Cossé-Brissac and Henriette Anne Louise d'Aguesseau, were guillotined. Their other niece, Adrienne, wife of the Marquis de Lafayette, was saved by the intervention of America's Minister to France, James Monroe. They and the other nobles who died on the guillotine are buried in the mass grave at the Picpus Cemetery.

== Issue ==
1. Louise Henriette Charlotte Philippine de Noailles (1745-1832)
2. Charles Adrien de Noailles (1747) Prince of Poix
3. Louis Philippe de Noailles (1748-1750) Prince of Poix
4. Daniel François Marie de Noailles (1750-1752) Marquis of Noailles, later Prince of Poix
5. Philippe de Noailles, Duke of Mouchy (1752-1819)
6. Louis Marie de Noailles, Viscount of Noailles (1756-1804)

== In popular culture ==
Anne d'Arpajon was played by Cora Witherspoon in Marie Antoinette (1938) and by Judy Davis in Marie Antoinette (2006).

Court offices
Preceded by Marie Brûlart	Première dame d'honneur to the Queen of France; 1763–1775	Succeeded by Laure Auguste de Fitz-James
