= Henri-Antoine-Marie de Noailles =

French nobleman (1890–1947)

Philippe de Noailles

Prince de Poix, Duke of Mouchy
- Tenure: 2 February 1909 – 1 November 1947
- Predecessor: 6th Duke of Mouchy
- Successor: 8th Duke of Mouchy
- Born: 9 April 1890; Paris, France
- Died: 1 November 1947 (aged 57); Paris, France
- Noble family: House of Noailles
- Spouse: Marie de La Rochefoucauld
- Issue: Philippe de Noailles; Philippine de Noailles; Sabine de Noailles
- Father: François Joseph Eugène Napoléon de Noailles
- Mother: Madeleine Marie Isabelle Dubois de Courval

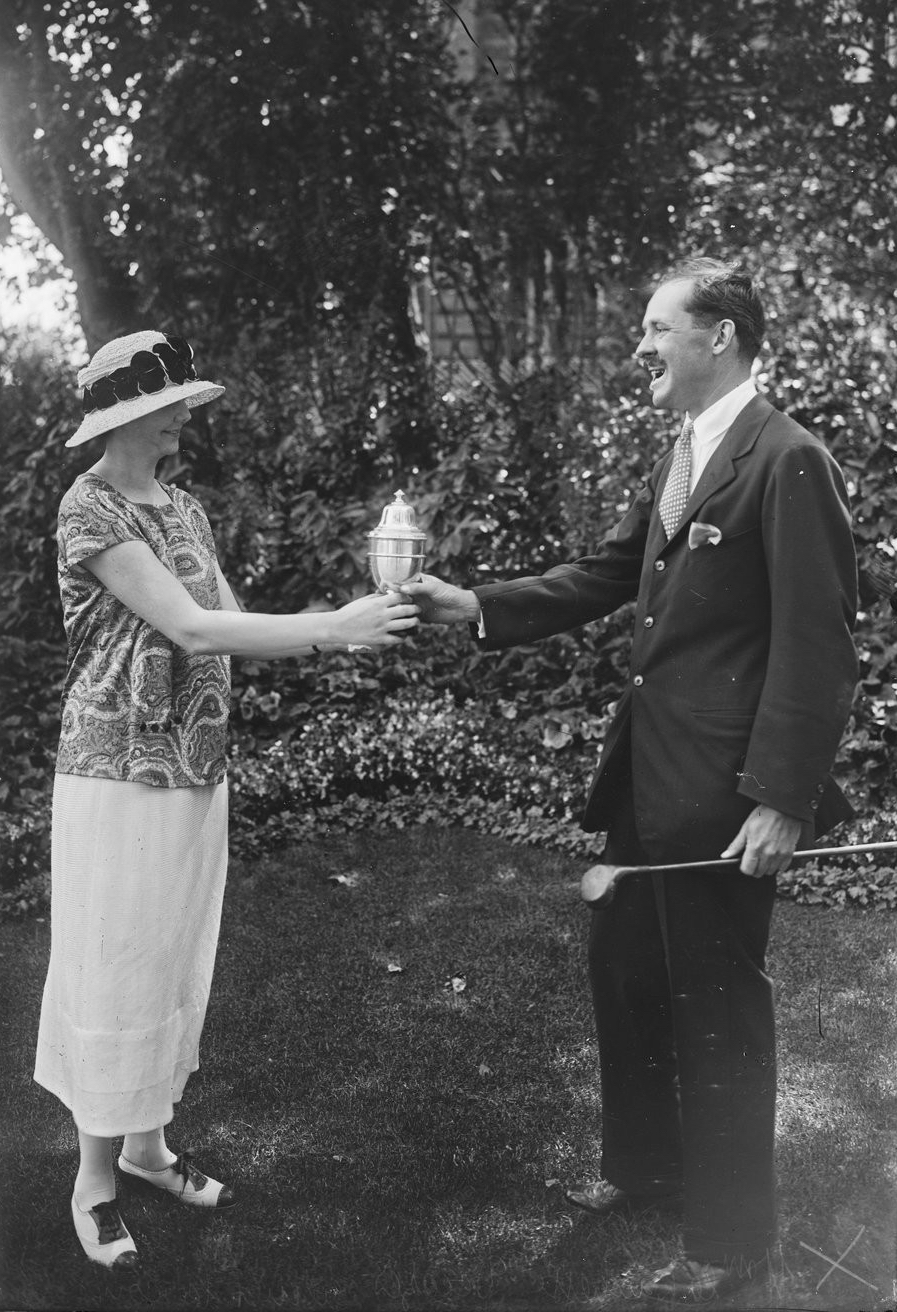
Duchess Decazes gives the cup to the Duke of Mouchy (Henri de Noailles - 1890-1947 -), golf winner (in Deauville) - (press photography) - (Agence Rol)

Henri Antoine Marie de Noailles, 11th Prince de Poix, 7th Duke of Mouchy (9 April 1890 – 1 November 1947) was a French nobleman.

== Early life ==
The Duke was born in Paris on 9 April 1890. He was the son of François Joseph Eugène Napoléon de Noailles (1866–1900), Prince de Poix, and Madeleine Marie Isabelle Dubois de Courval (1870–1944). His brother was Count Charles de Noailles (who married Marie-Laure Bischoffsheim) and his sister was Philippine de Noailles, who became Princess Eugène de Ligne upon her marriage to Eugène, 11th Prince of Ligne.

His grandparents were the 6th Duke of Mouchy and the Duchess of Mouchy, who before her marriage was Princess Anna Murat (daughter of Prince Lucien Murat, himself the second son of Joachim Murat King of Naples and his Queen Consort, Caroline Bonaparte, sister of Napoleon). Through his father, he was a descendant of Count Philippe de Noailles who was born in 1715 and who married Anne, the granddaughter of the Duke of d'Arpajon. His maternal grandparents were Vicomte Arthur Dubois de Courval and the former Mary Ray, who was born in New York City and descended from Loyalist James Boggs of Philadelphia and Thomas Cornell.

== Career ==
From 1909, he became the 11th Prince de Poix following the death of his grandfather Antonin-Just-Léon-Marie de Noailles (who predeceased Henri's father, who died in 1900).

For his service in World War I in France and on the Eastern front, the Duke of Mouchy was awarded a Chevalier of the Legion d'Honneur and decorated with the Croix de Guerre. During the War, the Château de Mouchy was used by Marshal Ferdinand Foch as his headquarters.

== Personal life ==
On 22 July 1920, he was married to Marie de La Rochefoucauld (1901–1983). She was the second daughter of the president of the Jockey-Club de Paris, Armand de La Rochefoucauld, Duke of Doudeauville (a descendant of Eugène, 8th Prince of Ligne) and Princess Louise Radziwiłł (a descendant of Antoni Radziwiłł, Princess Louise of Prussia, and François Blanc). Marie's siblings included Sosthène de La Rochefoucauld, and older sister, Hedwige de la Rochefoucauld, was married to Prince Sixtus of Bourbon-Parma. Together, they lived at the Château de Mouchy and had three children:

- Philippe François Armand Marie de Noailles (1922–2011), who married Diane de Castellane Fernández in 1948. They divorced in 1974 and he married Joan Douglas Dillon, the widow of Prince Charles of Luxembourg and the daughter of U.S. Secretary of Treasury C. Douglas Dillon, in 1978.
- Philippine de Noailles (1925–2022), who married Jean-Louis Sébastien Hubert, marquis de Ganay (1922–2013) in 1946 and reside at the Château de Courances.
- Sabine de Noailles (1931–2010), who married Nicolas Wyrubov (1915–2009) in 1953.

The Prince died in Paris on 1 November 1947, and was succeeded in his titles by his son, Philippe.

=== Descendants ===
Through his son Philippe, he was the grandfather of Nathalie Marie Thérèse de Noailles (b. 1949), who married Christian Charles Meissirel-Marquot in 1981; Antoine Georges Marie de Noailles (b. 1950), who married Isabelle Marie Jeanne Hélène Frisch de Fels in 1980; and Alexis de Noailles (b. 1952) who married Princess Diane d'Orléans (a daughter of Prince Jacques, Duke of Orléans) in 2004.

Through his daughter Philippine, he was the grandfather of Charlotte (born 1949), who married Charles de Marly, and Jacques (born 1956), who married Jacqueline Lomont (1966-1993).

French nobility
Preceded by Antonin-Just-Léon-Marie de Noailles	Duc de Mouchy; 1909–1947	Succeeded by Philippe François Armand Marie de Noailles
