= François de Noailles, Prince of Poix =

François de Noailles
- Prince of Poix
- Full name: François Joseph Eugène Napoléon de Noailles
- Born: 25 December 1866; Paris, France
- Died: May 8, 1900 (aged 33); Paris, France
- Noble family: of Noailles
- Spouse: Madeleine Dubois (29 June 1889)
- Father: Antoine de Noailles, 6th Duke of Mouchy
- Mother: Princess Anne Murat

François de Noailles, Prince of Poix (François Joseph Eugène Napoléon; 25 December 1866 – 8 May 1900) 10th Prince of Poix, was a French nobleman who used the courtesy title Prince of Poix (prince de Poix) as Heir apparent to the Duke of Mouchy, itself a cadet branch of the House of Noailles.

Son of Antonin-Just-Léon-Marie de Noailles (1841–1909), Duke of Mouchy, and Princess Anne Murat (1841–1924).

== Marriage ==
On, 29 June 1889 he married Madeleine Marie Isabelle Dubois (1870–1944), daughter of Arthur Dubois, Viscount of Courval (1826-1873) and his American wife Mary Ray (1835-1901).

== Children ==
1. Henri-Antoine-Marie de Noailles, Duke of Mouchy (1890–1947) married Marie de La Rochefoucauld (1901–1983)
2. Arthur Anne Marie Charles de Noailles, Viscount of Noailles (1891–1981) married Marie Laure Bischoffsheim.
3. Antoine Henri Alexis Marie de Noailles (born and died 1893)
4. Philippine Marie Cécile Douce de Noailles (1898–1991) married Eugène, 11th Prince of Ligne.

French nobility
Preceded by Charles-Philippe-Henri de Noailles	Prince de Poix; 25 December 1866 – 8 May 1900	Succeeded by Henri-Antoine-Marie de Noailles
