= Charles Arthur Tristan Languedoc de Noailles =

French aristocrat and politician (1771–1834)

Charles Arthur de Noailles
- 3rd Duke of Mouchy
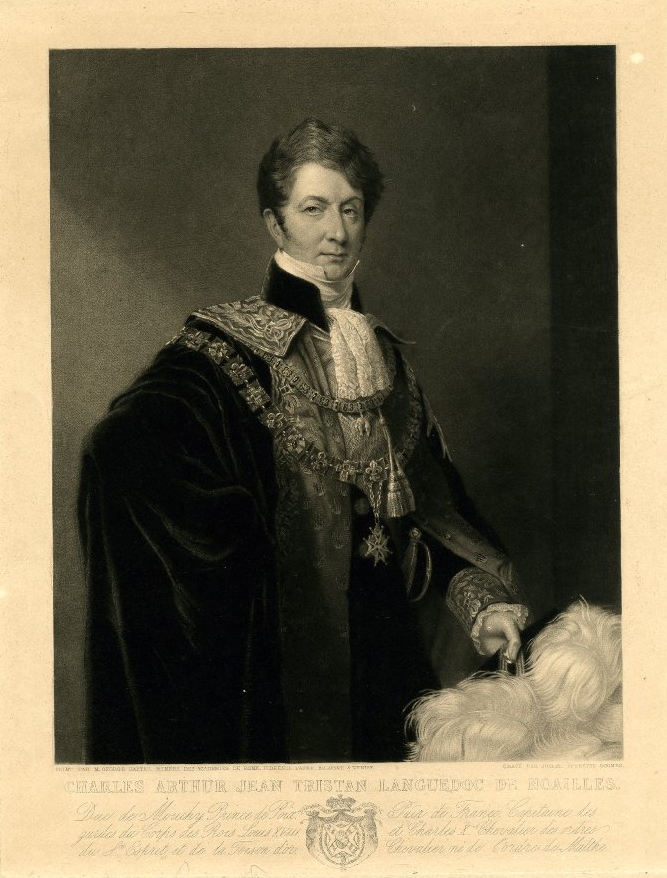
- Full name: Charles Arthur Tristan Languedoc de Noailles
- Born: 14 February 1771; Paris, France
- Died: 2 February 1834 (aged 62)
- Spouse: Nathalie Lucie Léontine de Laborde
- Issue: Rosalie de Noailles
- Father: Philippe Louis de Noailles
- Mother: Anne Louise Marie de Beauvau
- Occupation: Aristocrat; Politician

Charles Arthur de Noailles, 3rd Duke of Mouchy (Charles Arthur Tristan Languedoc; 14 February 1771 – 1834) was a French aristocrat and politician.

== Biography ==
=== Early life ===
Charles Arthur Tristan Languedoc de Noailles was born on 14 February 1771 in Paris. His father was Philippe Louis de Noailles (1752–1819), duc de Mouchy, and his mother, the duchesse Anne Louise Marie de Beauvau, Mademoiselle de Beauvau (1750–1834) (daughter of Charles Just de Beauvau and Marie Charlotte de la Tour d'Auvergne). He was educated in a military academy.

=== Public service ===
Shortly after graduating, he assisted his uncle in the Alsace. He was also a Knight of Malta. Due to the French Revolution, when many aristocrats were beheaded, he left France in 1791 and served in the Army of Condé. He then spent some time in England, only returning to France in 1800.

In 1815, he was elected to the National Assembly for the Meurthe Department. King Louis XVIII (1755-1824) appointed him Colonel and Knight in the Order of Saint Louis in 1814, Marshal of France in 1815, and Lieutenant-General in 1816. He was also appointed Knight of the Order of the Golden Fleece in 1820 and Officer of the Legion of Honour in 1823.

After the death of his father in 1819, he served as the sixth Prince of Poix, the 3rd Spanish Duke of Mouchy, the 2nd French Duke of Mouchy, and the Duke of Poix.

=== Marriage and progeny ===
In 1790, he married Nathalie Lucie Léontine de Laborde (1774–1835), daughter of the financier Jean-Joseph de Laborde. They had a daughter:

- Charlotte-Marie-Antoinette-Léontine de Noailles (1797–1851). In 1809, she married Alfred de Noailles (1784–1812), Viscount of Noailles, son of Louis Marc Antoine de Noailles (1756-1804). They had a daughter:
  - Anne Marie Cécile de Noailles (1812–1848). She married Charles Philippe Henri de Noailles (1808–1854).

=== Death ===
He died on 2 February 1834, at the age of 62.

French nobility
Preceded by Philippe-Louis-Marc-Antoine de Noailles	Duc de Mouchy; 1819–1834	Succeeded by Antonin Claude Dominique Just de Noailles
