= Louise Charlotte de Noailles =

French courtier and memoirist (1745–1832)

- Duchess of Duras
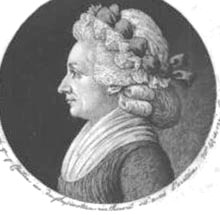
- Full name: Louise Charlotte de Noailles
- Born: 23 August 1745
- Died: 12 February 1832 (aged 86)
- Noble family: of Noailles
- Spouse: Emmanuel Céleste de Durfort, 5th Duke of Duras (10 December 1760)
- Issue: Amédée Bretagne Malo de Durfort, Duke of Duras
- Father: Philippe de Noailles, Count of Noailles
- Mother: Anne d'Arpajon

Louise Charlotte de Noailles, Duchess of Duras (23 August 1745-12 February 1832), was a French courtier and memoirist. She served as lady in waiting to Marie Antoinette from 1770 to 1791.

== Life ==
Louise-Charlotte de Duras was the daughter of Philippe de Noailles, the Count of Noailles created 1st Duke of Mouchy in 1747 and Anne d'Arpajon. In 1760, she married Emmanuel-Céleste de Durfort, 5th Duke of Duras (1741-1800), with whom she had a son, Amédée-Bretagne-Malo de Durfort (1771-1838).

In 1767, de Duras was appointed lady in waiting, Dame du Palais, to queen Marie Leszczynska to whom her mother served as chief lady-in-waiting. In 1770 she was, as her mother and many of the members of the household of the late queen, appointed to serve Marie Antoinette upon her arrival to France. Her mother, Anne d'Arpajon, served as the chief lady in waiting to Marie Antoinette.

=== Dames du Palais to Marie Antoinette ===
The duchess of Duras was described as very well educated, learned and verbal, and enjoyed respect for her reputation of being a scholar. When Victoire de Rohan was to be replaced as Governess of the Children of France in 1782, Duras, alongside Laure Auguste de Fitz-James, Princess of Chimay]], was commonly assumed to be the two most suitable candidates for the post: however, Marie Antoinette refused de Chimay because of her too severe religiosity and Duras because she reportedly felt a certain academic inferiority toward her, and chose Yolande de Polastron for the position instead.

Reportedly, Marie Antoinette felt a certain inferiority toward Louise-Charlotte Duras because of de Duras' greater learning and scholarly knowledge, and was therefore somewhat uncomfortable in her presence. Their relationship was therefore more professional than friendly. However, the queen also felt respect for her, and it was therefore often Duras who was selected to correct the queen whenever she made a mistake, such as when Marie Antoinette wished to visit the theater just one day after the death of her close friend Thérèse-Lucy de Dillon, which gave her much bad publicity. During the visit of Joseph II, Holy Roman Emperor in France in 1777, Marie Antoinette often selected Duras to accompany her during his visits, because she expected the intellectual Duras to make a more favourable impression upon Joseph than her more intimate friends among her courtiers, whom Joseph had been given harsh criticism.

=== French Revolution ===
Louise Charlotte remained in service at court after the outbreak of the French Revolution, and the removal of the court from Versailles to Paris after the Women's March on Versailles.

She resigned after the Flight to Varennes in 1791, along with a number of other members of the royal household, when the government issued reforms in the household of the king which abolished several old court customs and privileges of etiquette, such as the tabouret. Her spouse and her son both emigrated, her husband being a part of the Armée des Émigrés.

She retired to live with her parents in their Chateau Mouchy-le-Châtel in Oise in September 1792. On 25 August 1793, they were placed in house arrest on their estate in accordance with the decree of potential enemies of the state. On 6 October, Louise Charlotte was transferred to Beauvais and from there Chantilly, while her parents where transferred to La Force Prison in Paris ten days later. Her parents, sister-in-law Louise de Noailles, as well as her aunt Duchess of Noailles and cousin Henriette Anne Louise d'Aguesseau were all executed June-July 1794. She herself remained in prison and was liberated after the fall of Robespierre, settling with her mother-in-law, Louise Françoise de Coëtquen (1724-1802).

Louise-Charlotte de Duras' memoirs, depicting her life during the French Revolution, have been published.
