= Marie Charlotte de La Tour d'Auvergne =

- Princess of Craon
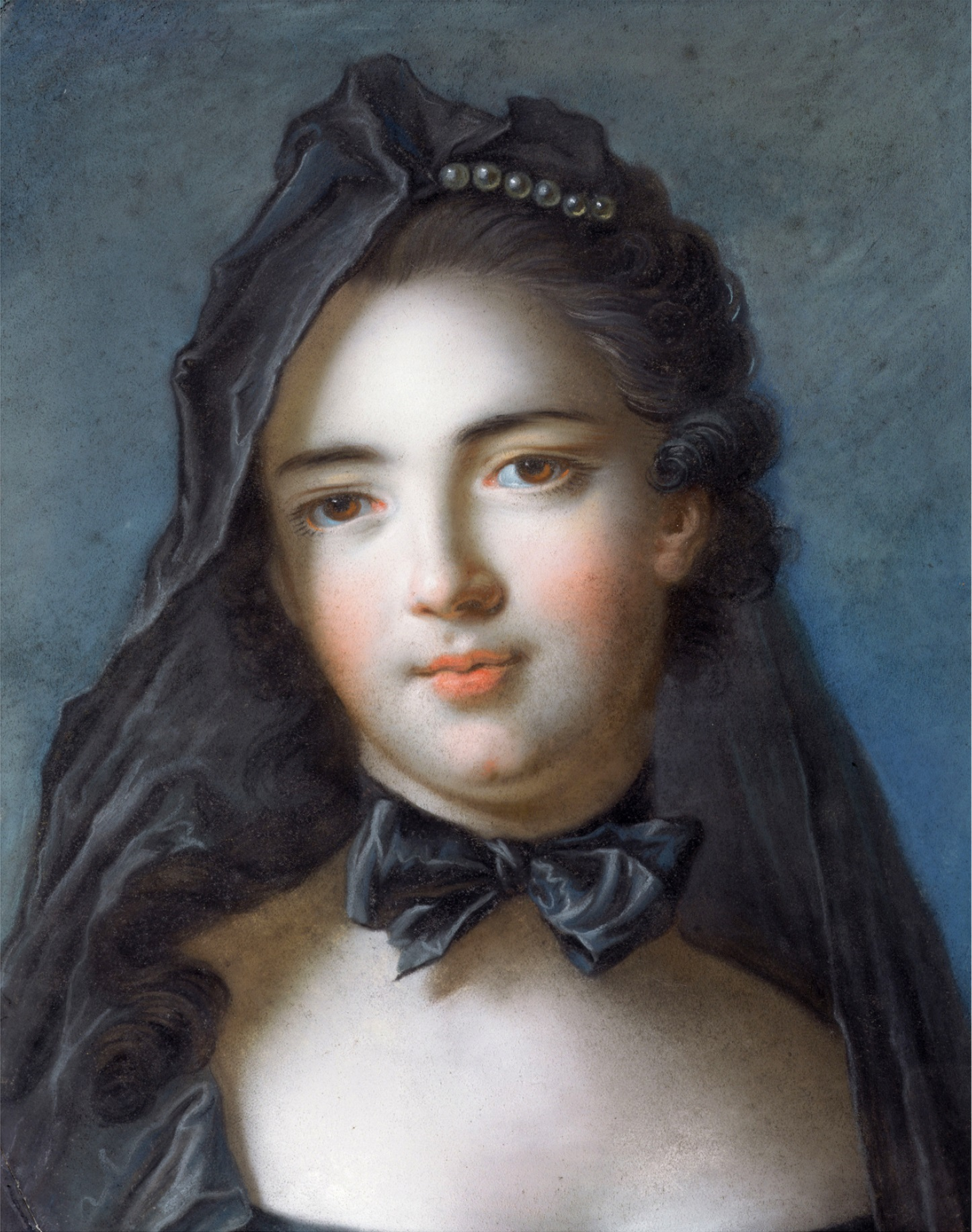
- Marie Charlotte by Nattier
- Born: 20 December 1729; Hôtel de Bouillon, Paris, France
- Died: 6 September 1763 (aged 33); Hôtel de Craon, Lunéville, Lorraine, France
- Spouse: Charles Juste de Beauvau
- Issue Detail: Louise, Duchess of Mouchy
Names
- Marie Sophie Charlotte de La Tour d'Auvergne
- House: La Tour d'Auvergne
- Father: Emmanuel Théodose de La Tour d'Auvergne
- Mother: Louise Henriette Françoise of Lorraine

Marie Charlotte de La Tour d'Auvergne (Marie Sophie Charlotte; 20 December 1729, Paris – 6 September 1763), was a French noblewoman and member of the House of La Tour d'Auvergne. Married into the House of Beauvau, a powerful family originating in Anjou, she had a daughter at the age of 20 and died of smallpox at the age of 33. The present Duke of Mouchy branch of the Noailles family are descended from her.

== Early life and ancestry ==
Born at the Hôtel de Bouillon in Paris to Emmanuel Théodose de La Tour d'Auvergne (1668–1730), sovereign Duke of Bouillon, and his last wife Louise Henriette Françoise of Lorraine; she was the couple's only child. Her mother was a daughter of Joseph of Lorraine, Count of Harcourt.

Her father was a son of Godefroy Maurice de La Tour d'Auvergne and his wife, Marie Anne Mancini, the latter was a niece of Cardinal Mazarin and an infamous hostess in her day.

Marie Charlotte was styled as Mademoiselle de Château-Thierry from birth. When her older half sister Anne Marie Louise, Mademoiselle de Bouillon was married to Charles de Rohan, Prince of Soubise in 1734, as the most senior unmarried princess of the La Tour d'Auvergne family, she was styled Mademoiselle de Bouillon until her marriage.

A first cousin included Antoine de Vignerot du Plessis, son of her aunt Élisabeth Sophie of Lorraine and the famous womanizer Armand de Vignerot du Plessis, Duke of Richelieu.

== Biography ==
Her father died in 1730, leaving her mother a widow at twenty-three. Her mother died in 1737. As such she became the ward of her uncle Louis Henri, Count of Évreux (comte d'Évreux).

In 1741, her maternal uncle Louis de Lorraine-Harcourt was a proposed candidate for the hand of the 12-year-old, but the marriage never materialised and he died childless in 1747.

She married Prince Charles Juste de Beauvau-Craon, a member of the wealthy Beauvau family of the Duchy of Lorraine, on 3 April 1745. Her sister in law (her husband's sister) was the famous marquise de Boufflers. Her daughter married Philippe Louis de Noailles, son of Philippe de Noailles and Anne d'Arpajon, lady-in-waiting to Marie Antoinette.

She died of smallpox at the Hôtel de Beauvau-Craon, her husband's town house in Lunéville, Lorraine. She and her daughter were heading to Paris from Lorraine when Marie Charlotte caught the illness. Notwithstanding the utmost care, she succumbed to the illness; at the time she was arranging the proposed marriage between her daughter Louise and Armand Louis de Gontaut, Duke of Lauzun.

Lauzun and Louise never married and were both greatly affected by the death of Marie Charlotte – the two were in love – and with the death of Marie Charlotte, Lauzun lost his most valuable ally, regarding a union with Louise and himself. Her daughter was placed in the Abbey of Port Royal in Paris where she remained till her marriage in 1767.

After her death, her husband married again in 1764 to Marie Charlotte Sylvie de Rohan-Chabot, a cousin of Charles de Rohan, Prince of Soubise.

== Issue ==
1. Anne Louise Marie de Beauvau, Mademoiselle de Beauvau (1 April 1750 – 20 November 1834) married Philippe Louis de Noailles, Prince de Poix, later Duke of Mouchy and had issue.

== Ancestry ==
Ancestors of Marie Charlotte de La Tour d'Auvergne

8. Frédéric Maurice de La Tour d'Auvergne, Duke of Bouillon
4. Godefroy Maurice de La Tour d'Auvergne, Duke of Bouillon
9. Countess Eleonora van den Bergh
2. Emmanuel Théodose de La Tour d'Auvergne, Duke of Bouillon
10. Michele Lorenzo Mancini
5. Marie Anne Mancini
11. Girolama Mazzarini
1. Marie Charlotte de La Tour d'Auvergne
12. Alphonse of Lorraine, Count of Harcourt
6. Joseph, Count of Harcourt
13. Françoise de Brancas
3. Louise Henriette Françoise de Lorraine
14. Gaspard Jeannin de Castille, Marquis of Montjeu
7. Marie Jeannin de Castille, Marquise of Montjeu
15. Louise Diane Dauvet
