= Charles Just de Beauvau, 4th Prince of Beauvau =

4th Prince of Beauvau (1793–1864)

Charles Just de Beauvau
- 4th Prince of Beauvau; Prince of the Holy Roman Empire; Senator of the First French Empire
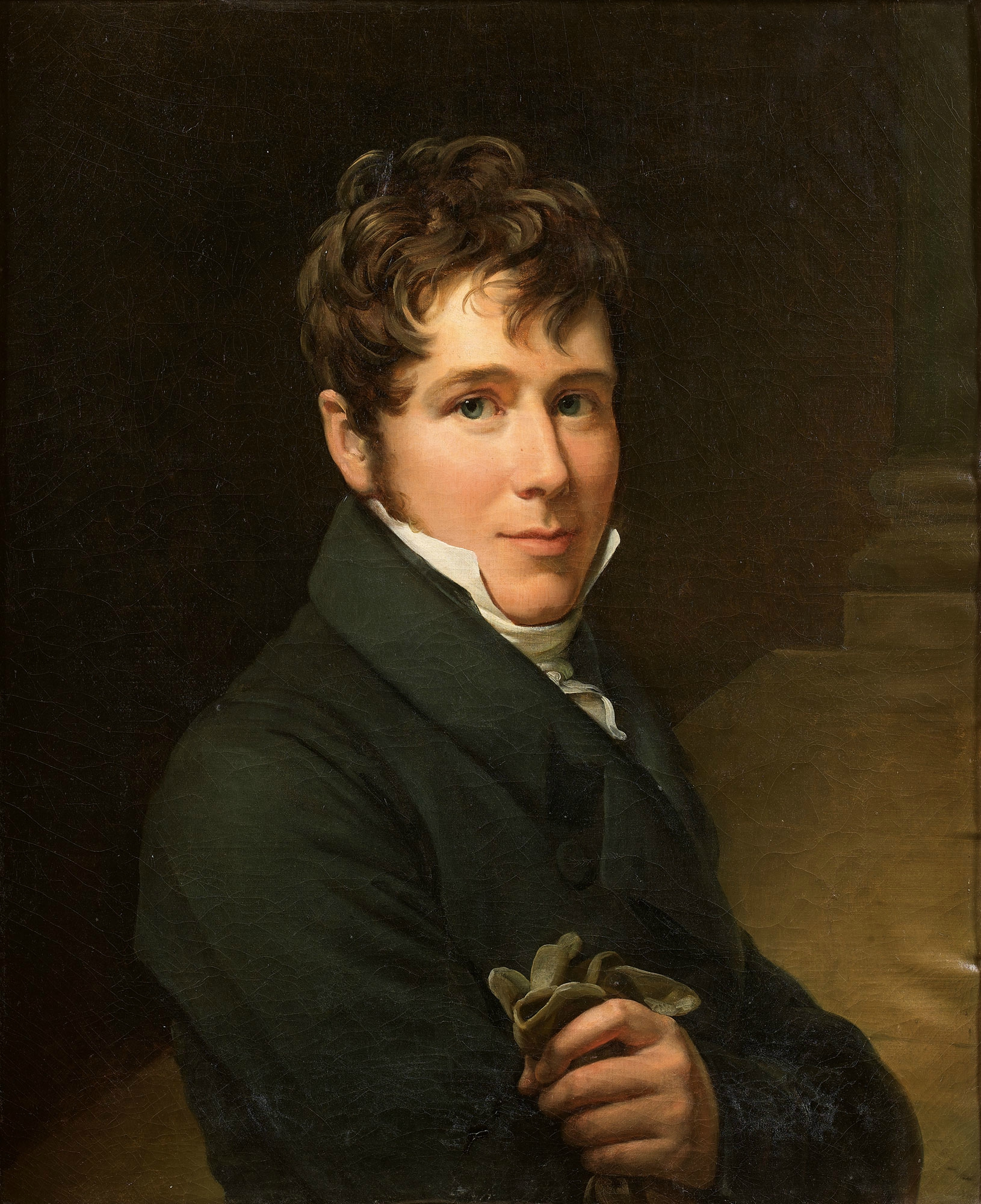
- Born: 7 March 1793; Sunninghill, Berkshire, England
- Died: 14 March 1864 (aged 71); Hôtel de Beauvau, Paris, France
- Spouse: Lucie-Virginie de Choiseul (m. 1815; died 1834) Ludmille Komar (m. 1839; died 1864)
- Issue: Marc de Beauvau, 5th Prince of Beauvau; Etienne de Beauvau-Craon; Élisabeth, Countess de Ludre; Béatrix, Countess de Choiseul-Praslin
Names
- Charles Just François Victurnien de Beauvau
- Father: Marc Étienne de Beauvau, 3rd Prince of Beauvau
- Mother: Nathalie de Rochechouart

Charles Just François-Victurnien de Beauvau-Craon, 4th Prince of Beauvau (7 March 1793 – 14 March 1864) was a 19th-century French senator and army officer. Though also Prince of Craon he was better known as the Prince of Beauvau.

== Early life ==
Charles was born on 7 March 1793 at Sunninghill in Berkshire, while his parents were in exile in England from the French Revolution. He was the son of Marc Étienne Gabriel, de Beauvau, chamberlain of Emperor Napoleon I, and Nathalie Henriette Victurnienne de Rochechouart, a lady of the palace of the Empress Marie-Louise. Among his siblings was Edmond-Henry-Étienne-Victurnien de Beauvau, prince de Craon.

His paternal grandparents were Ferdinand-Jérôme de Beauvau-Craon, Prince of Craon, Marquis of Haroué, and the former Louise Desmier d'Archiac (a daughter of General Étienne-Louis Desmier d'Archiac and granddaughter of Jean-Henri d'Anthès). His maternal grandparents were Victurnien-Jean-Baptiste Marie de Rochechouart, 9th Duke of Mortemart, and of the former Anne Catherine Gabrielle d'Harcourt.

== Career ==
After the family returned to France, he entered the French army in 1810, during the Napoleonic Wars, becoming an officer of carabiniers, two years later, during the campaign against Russia. The Prince was seriously wounded in the Battle of Winkovo, leading to his retirement from the service.

In 1827 he acquired the Château de Sainte-Assise and used his fortune to restore the estate, which had been divided up during the French Revolution. In 1852, Prince Louis-Napoleon Bonaparte named him senator, serving until his death in 1864. He was also elected Councillor-General of the Meurthe in 1854.

== Personal life ==
On 9 June 1815, he married Lucie-Virginie de Choiseul (1794–1834), the daughter of Antoine-César de Choiseul-Praslin, 3rd Duke of Choiseul-Praslin. Before her death, they were the parents of two sons:

- Marc René Antoine Victurnien de Beauvau-Craon (1816–1883), 5th Prince of Beauvau who married Marie Catherine d'Aubusson de La Feuillade and Adèle de Gontaut-Biron.
- Prince Etienne Guy Charles Victurnien de Beauvau-Craon (1818–1865), who married Berthe de Rochechouart, a daughter of Casimir de Rochechouart, 11th Duke of Mortemart, in 1844.

After he was widowed in 1834, he remarried on 2 April 1839 to Eugénie-Ludmille-Alexandrine-Joséphine Komar (1820–1881), a daughter of Stanisław Komar and Honorata Orłowska and sister to Countess Delfina Potocka (wife of Polish Count Mieczysław Potocki). Together, they were the parents of two daughters:

- Princess Marie-Delphine Élisabeth Stéphanie Hedwige de Beauvau-Craon (1842–1898), who married Count Gaston-Alexandre de Ludre.
- Princess Béatrix Jeanne Marie Joséphine de Beauvau-Craon (1844–1895), who married Count Horace de Choiseul-Praslin, second son of Charles de Choiseul, Duke of Praslin and Françoise, duchesse de Praslin.

The Duke died at his residence, the Hôtel de Beauvau, in the 8th arrondissement of Paris on 14 March 1864.

French nobility
Preceded by Marc Étienne de Beauvau-Craon	Prince of Beauvau; 1849–1864	Succeeded by Marc de Beauvau-Craon
