= Philippe Louis de Noailles =

French soldier and politician (1752–1819)

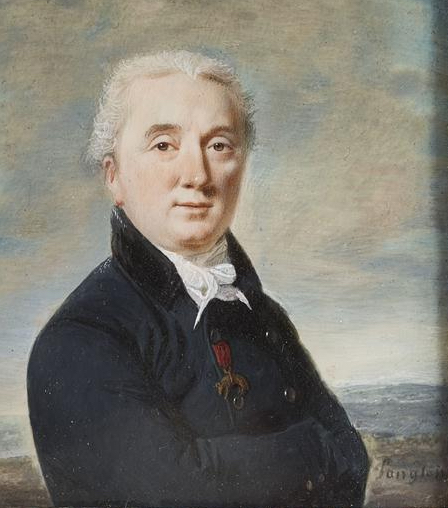
Comte de Noailles

Philippe-Louis-Marc-Antoine, comte de Noailles, prince-duc de Poix, and 2nd Spanish and 1st French duc de Mouchy (21 November or 21 December 1752 – 17 February 1819), was a French soldier, and politician of the Revolution.

== Biography ==
The son of Philippe de Noailles and grandson of Adrien-Maurice, 3rd duc de Noailles, he was born on 21 November 1752 and held the courtesy title of prince de Poix as a child.

He was married to Anne Louise Marie de Beauvau, known as Mademoiselle de Beauvau (1 April 1750 – 20 November 1834), only child of Charles Juste de Beauvau and Marie Charlotte de La Tour d'Auvergne (who in turn was a daughter of Emmanuel Théodose de La Tour d'Auvergne and his last wife Louise Henriette Francoise de Lorraine). He had two sons, Charles Arthur Tristan Languedoc de Noailles and Just de Noailles.

=== Political Instability ===
In 1789 he was elected to the Estates-General by the noblesse of Amiens and Ham, but was compelled to resign in consequence of a duel with the commander of the National Guard of Versailles.

Noailles briefly fled France, but later returned and took part in the riots of August, 1792. He was, however, forced to quit the country once more to evade the fate of his father and mother, who themselves were guillotined in 1794.

Upon his father's death, he inherited the titles of Comte de Noailles and duc de Poix, as well as to the Spanish title duc de Mouchy. Returning to France in 1800, with the amnesty of Émigrés, he remained at his residence in Mouchy-le-Châtel (Oise) during the Empire.

When the Bourbons were restored, he again came into favour and in 1817 was created duc de Mouchy as a French title, thus becoming a Peer of France.

He died at Paris on 17 February 1819.

== A comedy dedicated to Monseigneur the Poix ==
The false magic, comedy in one act presented for the first time on the theatre of the Italian Comedy, Wednesday 1 February 1775, is dedicated to Monseigneur the Poix, which shows us the shape of his character. The prince de Poix attends the salon of the countess d'Angivillers, wife of Charles-Claude Flahaut de la Billaderie, comte d'Angiviller, this woman enchanteresse, Mrs Necker. The court there meets with the French Academy, and people of arts and letters: Diderot, d'Alembert, Jean-François de la Harpe, Charles Pinot Duclos, Jean-François Marmontel, Jacques-Henri Bernardin de Saint-Pierre.

The prince de Poix, enamoured with one of the Queen's chambermaids, attends the coterie of Madame d'Angivilliers. There, he meet the young chambermaid in the Parisian living room of d'Angivilliers. Not as loyal as his vénérable father, he goes elsewhere to separate from its wife, so that he may entertain the chambermaid.

French nobility
Preceded by Philippe de Noailles, duc de Mouchy	Duc de Mouchy; 1794–1819	Succeeded by Charles-Arthur-Tristan-Languedoc de Noailles
