= Just de Noailles =

French politician

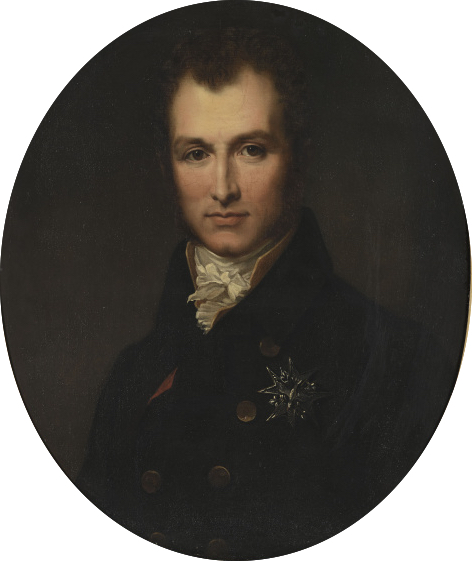

Duke of Mouchy
- Tenure: 2 February 1834 – 1 August 1846
- Predecessor: Charles Arthur Tristan Languedoc
- Successor: Charles Philippe Henri
- Born: 22 August 1777
- Died: 1 August 1846 (aged 68)
- Spouse: Françoise Xavière Melanie Honorine of Talleyrand-Périgord
- Issue: Charles Philippe Henri de Noailles; Charles Antonin de Noailles; Amédée Adelaide Louis de Noailles; Angelica Léontine Sabine Alexandrine de Noailles
- Father: Philippe Louis de Noailles
- Mother: Anne Louise Marie de Beauvau

Antonin Claude Dominique Just de Noailles (22 August 1777 in Paris – 1 August 1846 in Paris), 7th Prince of Poix then (from 1834) 4th Spanish Duke of Mouchy, 3rd French Duke of Mouchy and Duke of Poix, was a French politician.

== Biography ==
Son of Philippe-Louis-Marc-Antoine de Noailles (1752–1819) and of Anne Louise Marie de Beauvau (1750–1834), he was a student at the College des Grassins. Anne Louise Marie was a daughter of Charles Just de Beauvau and grand daughter of Emmanuel Théodose de La Tour d'Auvergne.

During the French Revolution, which tested his family so cruelly, he lived in Paris with his mother in the greatest darkness. He did not reappear until the Consulate, when in 1803, he married a niece of the Prince de Talleyrand and was introduced in 1806 to Napoleon, who named him chamberlain. Created Count of Worsen on 27 September 1810, he commanded, in 1814, a company of the national guard of Paris.

He welcomed the return of the Bourbons with the Treaty of Fontainebleau (1814). Louis XVIII treated him extremely well with Compiègne, created him Knight of the Order of Saint-Louis and commander of the Légion d'honneur on 13 August 1814 and named him ambassador to Saint Petersburg, where he remained until 1819; persona grata with the czar, he was the only foreign minister allowed at the imperial table on the dinner of 24 December 1814. With the death of his father, he inherited the title count of Noailles, after the renunciation of his older brother, Charles-Arthur-Tristan-Languedoc de Noailles, 2nd duc de Mouchy. Returning to France, he was presented to the delegation, and lost 1 October 1821, in the 2nd Arrondissement of Meurthe (Lunéville), with 51 votes against 107 with the elected official, Mr. Laruelle. Nominated president of the large college of Meurthe in 1824, he was elected, on March 6 of this same year, by this same college, with 185 votes (194 voters, 224 registered voters). He expressed his moderate opinions in the Chamber of Deputies, and joined the liberal party.

Charles X named him knight of the Order of the Holy Spirit on 30 May 1825 following his Coronation in Reims.

Returning to private life in 1827, Mr. de Noailles occupied himself in charitable works, was one of the founders of the Company for the improvement of the prisons and chaired administration of the Company of prévoyance.

=== Family life ===
He married on 11 May 1803 Françoise Xavière Melanie Honorine of Talleyrand-Périgord (September 18, 1785, Paris – February 19, 1863, Versailles), lady of Madame la duchesse de Berry, niece of Prince de Talleyrand, and daughter of Archambaud-Louis-Joseph (September 1, 1762, Paris – May 3, 1838, Saint-Germain-en-Laye), duke of Talleyrand-Périgord, General Lieutenant of the armies of the king, and Madelaine-Henriette-Sabine Olivier de Senozan-Viriville (1764 – July 26, 1794), victim of revolutionary Tribunal.

They had four children:

1. Charles-Philippe-Henri de Noailles (1808–1854), 5th duc de Mouchy, Princes de Poix;
2. Charles Antonin (March 13, 1810 – August 24, 1852, Chateau du Val (Seine-et-Marne)), styled comte de Noailles, commander of the Légion d'honneur, married in Paris April 25, 1849, Anne Marie Elena Cosvelt;
3. Amédée Adelaide Louis (October 9, 1811 – February 27, 1860, Valves), Secretary of embassy;
4. Angelica Léontine Sabine Alexandrine (May 13, 1819, Paris – March 20, 1870, Paris) who married (September 5, 1846) Charles Henry Lionel Widdrington Standish (1823–1883).

== Offices ==
Old chamberlain of Napoleon, Just de Noailles became ambassador of France in Russia (1814–1819) then appointed of Meurthe (Lunéville), (1824–1827).

French nobility
Preceded by Charles-Arthur-Tristan-Languedoc de Noailles	Duc de Mouchy; 1834–1846	Succeeded by Charles-Philippe-Henri de Noailles
