= Marc de Beauvau, 1st Prince of Craon =

Lorrainese nobleman and Viceroy (1676-1754)

Marc de Beauvau
- 1st Prince of Craon
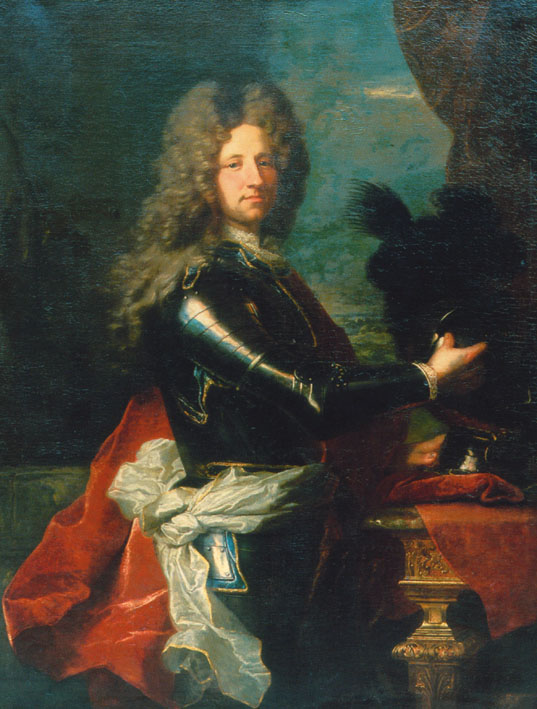
- Portrait by Hyacinthe Rigaud, 1711
- Born: 2 April 1676; Nancy, Duchy of Lorraine
- Died: 10 March 1754 (aged 74)
- Father: Louis de Beauvau, Marquis of Beauvau
- Mother: Anne de Ligny

Marc de Beauvau, 1st Prince of Craon (2 April 1676 - 10 March 1754), was a Lorrainese nobleman who served as the President of the 'Council of Regency' – de facto a viceroy — of the Grand Duchy of Tuscany.

== History ==
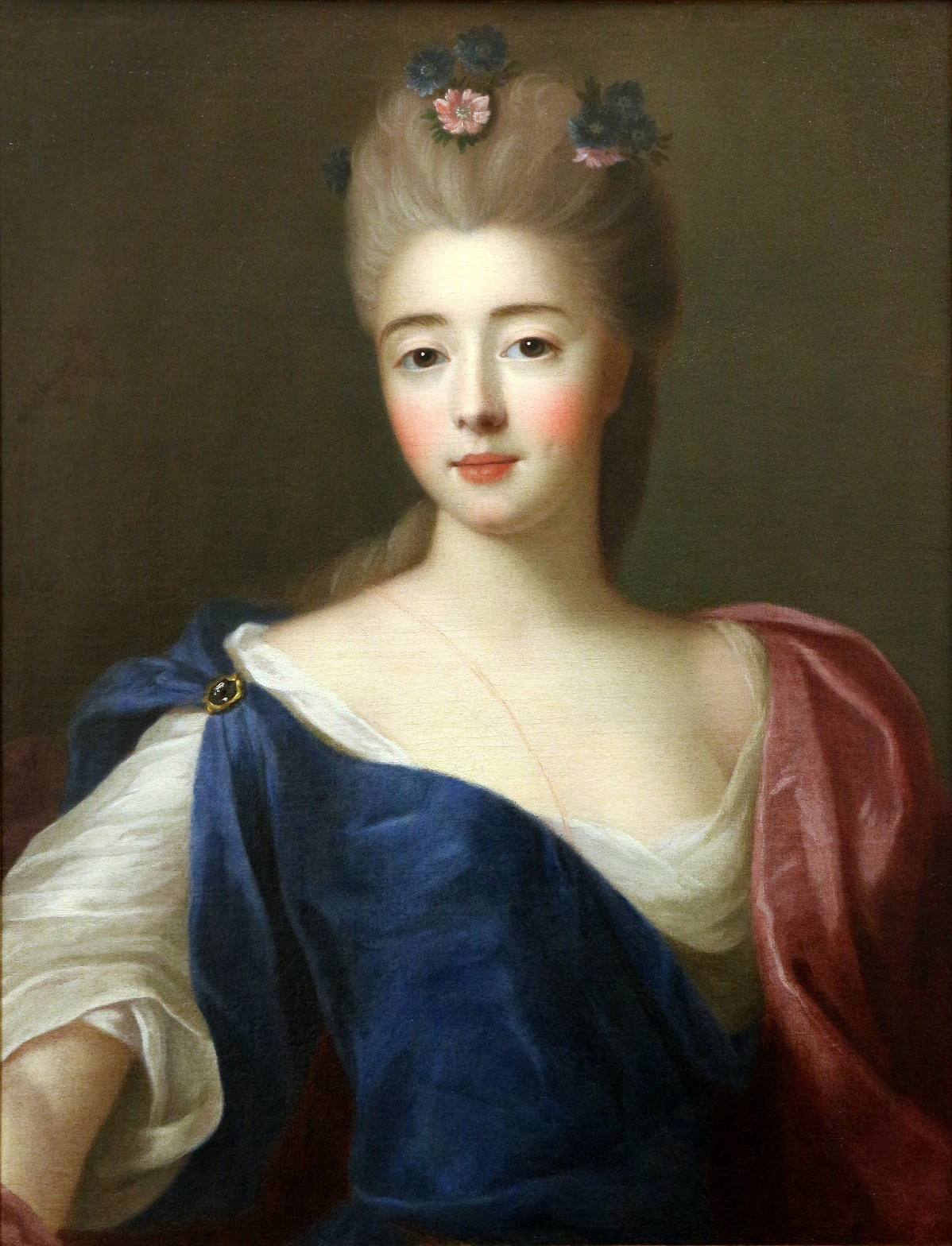
Marc's wife, Anne-Marguerite de Lignéville

Born in Nancy, the capital of the Duchy of Lorraine, Marc was the son of Louis, Marquis of Beauvau (1638–1703) and his second wife, Anne de Ligny.

He was the same age as the future Duke Leopold of Lorraine and grew up as his childhood friend at first, then as his companion in adventures. His wife, Anne Marguerite de Lignéville (1686–1772), whom he married in Lunéville on 16 September 1704, became Léopold's mistress, apparently without any effect on the relationship between the two spouses or between the two friends. Anne Marguerite was almost constantly pregnant for twenty-five years, giving birth to twenty children, several of whom are thought to have been fathered by the Duke, at least judging by the advantageous marriages, abbeys or other ecclesiastical privileges bestowed upon them.

Marc de Beauvau always remained at the Duke's side as the main figure in his court, and, as a proof of the latter's trust, he was first appointed gouverneur (literally "governor", i.e. responsible for education), then grand écuyer ("grand squire"), of his son and heir, Francis Stephen, the future Duke and Emperor Francis I.

Marc's sister, Catharine Diana de Beauveau, married the Irish Jacobite exile Owen O'Rourke.

=== Grand Duchy of Tuscany ===
In 1737 he was entrusted with the government of the Grand Duchy of Tuscany by the newly established Grand Duke and his former tutee, Francis Stephen of Lorraine, who had been declared successor of the last Medici ruler in the Treaty of Vienna, but did not intend to reside in Tuscany. He administered the state as a sort of viceroy, officially with the title of President of the 'Council of Regency', from the latter's establishment in 1737 until 1748, but was soon sidelined and reduced to more of a representative role by the president of the Council of Finance, Emmanuel de Nay, count of Richecourt - who eventually replaced him in the position.

=== Titles and residences ===
On 21 August 1712, Duke Leopold of Lorraine established the towns of Houdonville (now Croismare) and Haroué as a marquisate within the Duchy, and invested his friend with it: the new title was given the style 'Craon', after the ancient family from the Angevin Mayenne, from which the Beauvaus claimed descent through the female line.

On 13 November 1722, the Duke had Emperor Charles VI bestow upon his favourite the title of Prince of the Holy Roman Empire, styled 'von Beauvau und Craon', and, at the same time, elevated the Marquisate of Craon to a principality: Marc de Beauvau thus became the first prince of the fiefdom. Leopold also facilitated the conferral of the Grandate of Spain, First Class, on his friend by King Philip V on 8 May 1727. In 1739, long after Leopold had died, he would be awarded the title of Knight of the Order of the Golden Fleece (No. 690) by the Emperor.

His son, Charles Juste was admitted to the Honneurs de la Cour in Paris with the princely title in 1755.

Between 1720 and 1729, Marc de Beauvau had a splendid new palace built at Haroué, on the ruins of an ancient medieval castle that had already been renovated. This palace, well preserved into the 21st century, is still dwelt in by the Beauvau-Craon family. It was commissioned to Germain Boffrand, the architect of the Château de Lunéville. In 1715, after eighteen months of work, on the lease of a previous palace and with funds donated by the duke, the same Boffrand had already overseen the construction of the hôtel particulier of the Beauvau-Craon family in Nancy. The building was sold in 1751 to the last duke, and erstwhile king of Poland, Stanisław Leszczyński, who installed his court there. The «hôtel de Beauvau-Craon» still stands proudly on the place de la Carrière, and has become the seat of the court of appeal of Nancy.

=== Death ===
Having returned to Haroué at the end of his commitments in Tuscany, Marc de Beauvau died in his castle in 1754.

=== Issue ===
He had eight sons and 12 daughters, as follows:

1. Élisabeth Charlotte de Beauvau (1705–1754), married Charles Ferdinand François de La Baume, Marquis of Saint-Martin, no issue.
2. Anne Marguerite Gabrielle de Beauvau (1707–1792), married Jacques Henri of Lorraine, Prince of Mortagne(-sur-Gironde), no issue; married Gaston Pierre Charles de Lévis, Duke of Mirepoix, no issue.
3. Gabrielle Françoise de Beauvau (1708–1758), married Gabriel Alexandre d'Alsace de Henin-Liétard, Prince of Chimay, no issue.
4. Marie Philippe Tècle de Beauvau (1709–1748), Canoness of Remiremont.
5. Nicolas Simon Jude de Beauvau (1710–1734), Abbé de Craon, never married.
6. Marie Françoise de Beauvau (1711–1787), married Louis François de Boufflers, Marquis of Amestranges and had issue; she was renowned for being the royal mistress of Stanisław Leszczyński;
7. François Vincent Marc de Beauvau (1713–1742), Primat de Lorraine, never married.
8. Léopold Clément de Beauvau (1714–1723), knight of the Order of Malta.
9. Marie Louise Eugénie de Beauvau (1715–1734), Abbess of Epinal.
10. Henriette Augustine de Beauvau (1716-unknown), nun in the Order of the Visitation of Holy Mary.
11. Charlotte Nicole de Beauvau (1717–1787), married Léopold Clément de Bassompierre, no issue.
12. Anne Marguerite de Beauvau (1719-unknown), nun in Paris.
13. Charles Juste de Beauvau (1720–1793), married Marie Sophie Charlotte de La Tour d'Auvergne daughter of Emmanuel Theodose de La Tour d'Auvergne, sovereign Duke of Bouillon and Louise Henriette Francoise de Lorraine and had issue; married Marie Charlotte Sylvie de Rohan, no issue.
14. Elisabeth de Beauvau (1722-unknown), Canoness in Poussy, then a nun in Paris.
15. Ferdinand Jerôme de Beauvau, Marquis of Haroué (1723–1790), married Louise Etienne Desmier and had issue.
16. Gabrielle Charlotte de Beauvau (1724–1790), Canoness in Remiremont, nun in Juvigny, last abbess of Saint-Antoine-des-Champs in Paris.
17. Alexandre Louis de Beauvau, Marquis de Craon (1725–1745), killed in action at the Battle of Fontenoy.
18. Béatrix Alexis de Beauvau (1727–1730), died in childhood.
19. Hilarion François Louis de Beauvau (b. and d. 1728), died in infancy.
20. Antoine de Beauvau (1730–1736), died in childhood.

== Bibliography ==
- Baumont, Henri (1894). Études sur le règne de Léopold duc de Lorraine et de Bar (1697-1729). Doctoral thesis presented at the Faculty of Letters of Nancy. Paris/Nancy: Berger-Levrault.
