= Guibal =

Guibal is a surname, more common in France. People with the surname include:

- Barthélemy Guibal, (1699-1757), a French sculptor.
- Nicolas Guibal, (1725–1784), a French artist.
- Théophile Guibal, (1814-1888), a French engineer and inventor. (see French Wikipedia article: Théophile Guibal)
- Jean-Claude Guibal, (1941–2021), a French politician.
- Brigitte Guibal, (b. 1971), a French slalom canoeist.
