= Marc de Beauvau, 5th Prince of Beauvau =

Marc de Beauvau-Craon
- 5th Prince of Beauvau; Prince of the Holy Roman Empire
- Born: 7 March 1793; Paris, France
- Died: 30 March 1884 (aged 68); Nice, France
- Spouse: Marie Catherine d'Aubusson de La Feuillade (m. 1840; died 1862) Adèle de Gontaut-Biron (m. 1875; died 1883)
- Issue: Jeanne, Countess de Mun; Isabelle, Duchess of Guiche; Louise, Countess d'Aulps; Henriette, Countess d'Harcourt; Charles Louis de Beauvau-Craon, 6th Prince of Beauvau
Names
- Marc René Antoine Victurnien de Beauvau
- Father: Charles Just de Beauvau, 4th Prince of Beauvau
- Mother: Lucie-Virginie de Choiseul

Marc René Antoine Victurnien de Beauvau-Craon, 5th Prince of Beauvau (29 March 1816 – 30 March 1883) was a 19th-century French politician and aristocrat.

== Early life ==
He was the eldest son of Charles Just de Beauvau, 4th Prince of Beauvau and, his first wife, Lucie-Virginie de Choiseul (1794–1834). Among his younger siblings were Prince Etienne de Beauvau-Craon and, from his father's second marriage to Ludmille Komar (sister of Countess Delfina Potocka), his half-sisters, Princess Élisabeth de Beauvau-Craon (wife of Count Gaston-Alexandre de Ludre) and Princess Béatrix de Beauvau-Craon (wife of Count Horace de Choiseul-Praslin)

His paternal grandparents were Marc Étienne Gabriel, de Beauvau, chamberlain of Emperor Napoleon I, and Nathalie Henriette Victurnienne de Rochechouart, a lady of the palace of the Empress Marie-Louise. His maternal grandparents were Antoine-César de Choiseul-Praslin, 3rd Duke of Choiseul-Praslin, and Lady Antoinette O'Brien (a daughter of Charles O'Brien, 8th Earl of Thomond).

== Career ==
The Prince was passionate about horse riding and devoted his leisure time and fortune to the improvement of the horse breed in France. He had a well known stable and was one of the most active members of the Jockey Club de Paris.

He was elected on 29 February 1852 in the 4th electoral district in the department of Sarthe. He was successively re-elected in the same district on 22 June 1857 and on 1 June 1863. He was known to joins the votes of the opposition, draws closer to the centre-left and signs the "Interpellation of the 116". He was also elected general councilor of Sarthe.

He was made a Knight of the Legion of Honour in 1858, before being elevated to an Officer of the Legion of Honour in 1866.

Upon the death of his father in 1864, he became Prince of Beauvau as well as inheriting the Château de Sainte-Assise in Seine-Port in the Seine-et-Marne department, where he entertained his numerous relatives.

== Personal life ==
On 26 November 1840, he married Countess Marie Catherine d'Aubusson de La Feuillade (1824–1862), a daughter of Count Augustin Pierre d'Aubusson de La Feuillade and Blanche Catherine Rouillé de Boissy. Before her death in 1862, they were the parents of three daughters:

- Princess Jeanne Victurnienne de Beauvau-Craon, (1848–1924), married Count Robert de Mun in 1867.
- Princess Isabelle Marie Blanche Charlotte Victurnienne de Beauvau-Craon (1852–1875), who married Agénor de Gramont, Duke of Guiche, in 1874. After her death, he inherited the dukedom of Gramont and married Marguerite de Rothschild.
- Princess Louise de Beauvau-Craon (1861–1885), who married Count Bertrand de Blacas d'Aulps in 1879.

After the death of his first wife in 1862, he remarried on 30 September 1875 to Marie Adèle de Gontaut-Biron (1848–1938), a daughter of Elie de Gontaut-Biron, Viscount of Gontaut-Biron, Ambassador to Berlin, and Augustine de L'Espinay. Together, they were the parents of two children:

- Princess Henriette de Beauvau-Craon (1876–1931), who married Count Charles d'Harcourt in 1896.
- Charles-Louis Juste Élie Marie Joseph Victurnien de Beauvau-Craon (1878–1942), who married Countess Marie "Minnie" Grace Gregorini-Bingham, the daughter of Count Gregorini-Bigham of Bologna, in 1920. After his death, she married Lt.-Gen. Sir Humfrey Myddelton-Gale in 1945.

The Duke died in Nice on 30 March 1883.

French nobility
Preceded by Charles Just de Beauvau-Craon	Prince of Beauvau; 1864–1883	Succeeded by Charles Louis de Beauvau-Craon
