= Marie Françoise Catherine de Beauvau-Craon =

French noblewoman (1711–1786)

Madame de Boufflers
- Marquise of Boufflers
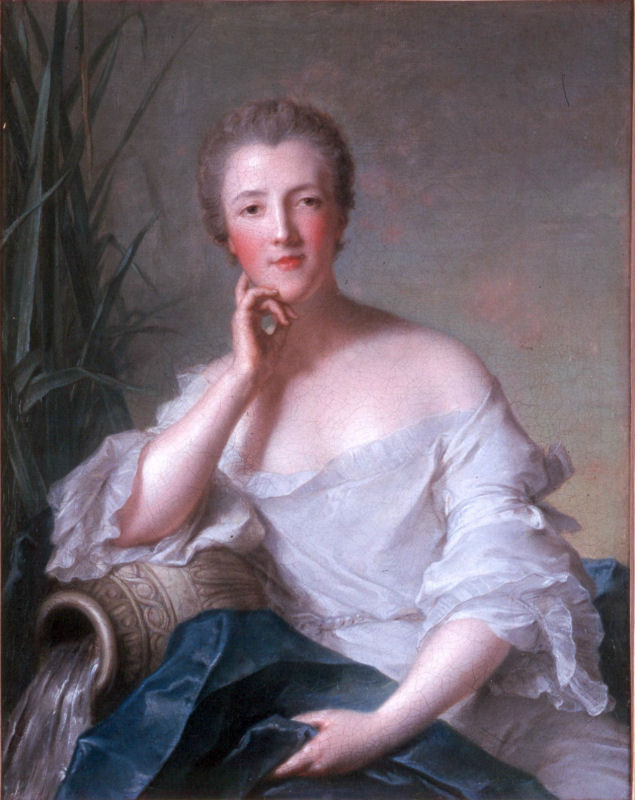
- portrait by Jean Marc Nattier
- Full name: Marie Françoise Catherine de Beauvau
- Born: 8 December 1711; Lunéville, Lorraine
- Died: 1 July 1786 (aged 74); Scey-sur-Saône-et-Saint-Albin
- Spouses: Louis François de Boufflers, Marquis of Amestranges
- Father: Marc, Prince of Craon
- Mother: Anne Marguerite de Ligniville

Marie Françoise Catherine de Beauvau, Marquise of Boufflers (8 December 1711 – 1 July 1786), commonly known as Madame de Boufflers, was a French noblewoman. She was the royal mistress of Stanislas Leszczyński and mother of the poet Stanislas de Boufflers.

== Family ==
Her father was Marc de Beauvau, Prince of Craon, and her mother was Anne Marguerite de Lignéville (1686–1772), mistress of Leopold, Duke of Lorraine. She had nineteen siblings, including Charles Juste de Beauvau, through whom she was a sister-in-law of Marie Charlotte de La Tour d'Auvergne. Marie Françoise Catherine married Louis François de Boufflers (1714–1752), Marquis of Amestranges, with whom she had Stanislas de Boufflers, later famous as a poet.

== Biography ==
Witty, well-educated and beautiful, the marquise de Boufflers wrote verse and drew in pastel. At the court at Lunéville, aged 34, she became the chief mistress to king Stanislas, then aged 64. This did not stop her also collecting other lovers; nicknamed La Dame de Volupté ("the lady of delight"), she was also the mistress of the poet Jean François de Saint-Lambert, then of M. of Adhémar, of the intendant de Lorraine Antoine-Martin Chaumont de La Galaizière, of the lawyer and poet François-Antoine Devaux.

To try to make the Marquise de Boufflers jealous and regain her affections, Saint-Lambert attempted to seduce the Marquise du Châtelet when the latter arrived in Lunéville in 1748. The Marquise du Châtelet fell passionately in love with the poet and became best friends with the Marquise de Boufflers, thus completely ruining the plans of Father Menou, Stanislas' confessor, who wanted to use her to dislodge the Marquise de Boufflers as chief mistress to the king.

Her witty poem "Sentir avec ardeur" is cited in French and in full by the twentieth-century Modernist poet Marianne Moore in the notes to Moore's poem "Tom Fool at Jamaica."

Stanislaus I had a chartreuse cottage constructed along the northern side of the Palace of Lunéville.
