= Antonin-Just-Léon-Marie de Noailles =

Antoine Just Léon Marie de Noailles (19 April 1841 in Paris – 2 February 1909) 9th prince de Poix, from (1846) 6th duc espagnol de Mouchy, 5th duc français de Mouchy et duc de Poix, from 1854, was a French nobleman.

Son of Charles-Philippe-Henri de Noailles (1808–1854), duc de Mouchy, and the duchesse Anne Marie Cécile de Noailles (1812–1848), he was married on 18 December 1865, to the princesse Anne Murat (1841–1924), daughter of Prince Napoleon Lucien Charles Murat.

They had two children:

1. François Joseph Eugène Napoléon de Noailles (1866–1900), prince de Poix
2. Sabine Lucienne Cécile Marie de Noailles (1868–1881)

French nobility
Preceded by Charles-Philippe-Henri de Noailles	Duke of Mouchy; 1854–1909	Succeeded by Henri-Antoine-Marie de Noailles
