= Louis Marie de Noailles =

French Army officer and politician (1756–1804)

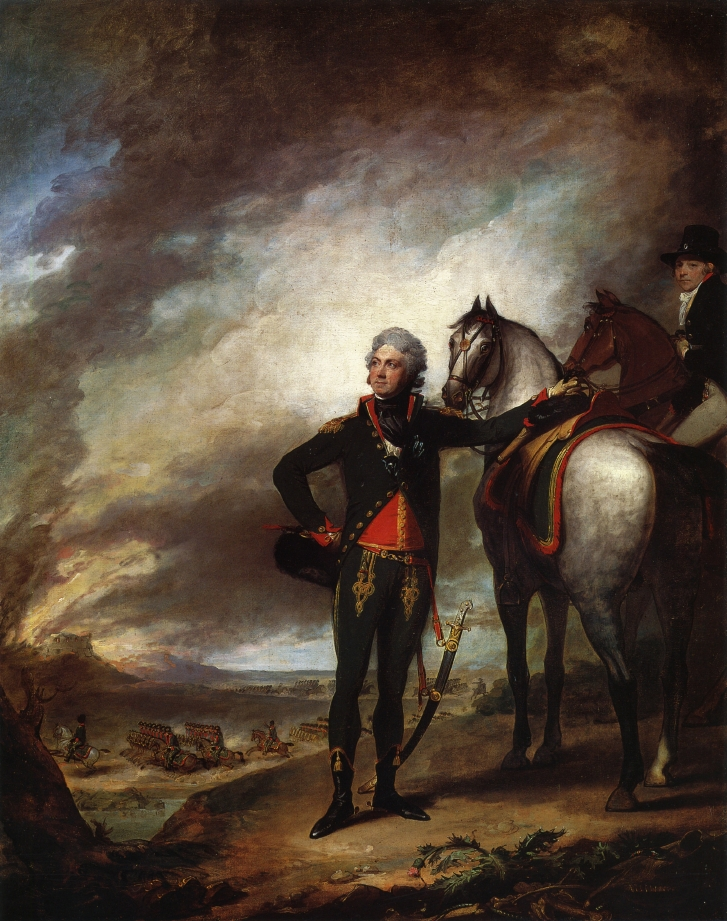
1798 portrait of de Noailles by Gilbert Stuart

Louis Marie de Noailles (17 April 1756 – 7 January 1804) was a French Army officer and politician who served in the American Revolutionary War and French Revolutionary Wars. The second son of Philippe, duc de Mouchy, he was a member of Mouchy branch of the Noailles family of French nobility.

== Career ==
De Noailles was born in Paris. He served under his brother-in-law the Marquis de Lafayette in America during the American War for Independence and was the officer who concluded the capitulation of Yorktown in 1781.

He was elected to the Estates-General in 1789. On 4 August 1789, during the French Revolution, he began the famous "orgy" (as Honoré-Gabriel Mirabeau called it) when feudalism was to be abolished, and the Duc d'Aiguilion proposed the abolition of titles and liveries in June 1790.

As the French Revolution progressed and became more dangerous for nobles, he emigrated to the United States and became a partner in William Bingham's Bank of North America in Philadelphia. He was successful in the United States.

He accepted a command in Saint-Domingue under Donatien-Marie-Joseph de Vimeur, vicomte de Rochambeau, fighting against Black rebels. He commanded a defence of the Môle-Saint-Nicolas and set sail with the town garrison for Cuba in 1803 but en route there his ship was attacked by a British schooner. After a long engagement, he was severely wounded, and died of his wounds in Havana on 9 January 1804. De Noailles was a member of the Society of the Cincinnati from France.

== Personal life ==
He married his cousin Anne Jeanne Baptiste de Noailles (1758–1794), daughter of Jean Louis Paul François de Noailles, Duke of Noailles. They had four children:

1. Adrienne Theodore Philippine de Noailles (1778–1781), who died young.
2. Louis Joseph Alexis de Noailles, Count of Noailles(1783–1835), who married Cécile de Boisgelin (1797–1836), the only child of Marquis Bruno-Gabriel de Boisgelin and Cécile d'Harcourt-Beuvron.
3. Alfred Louis Dominique Vincent de Paul de Noailles, Viscount of Noailles (1784–1812) married Rosalie Charlotte Antoinette Léontine de Noailles (1797–1851), daughter of Charles Arthur Tristan Languedoc de Noailles.
4. Euphemia Cécile Marie Adelaide de Noailles (1790–1870), who married Olivier de Saint-Georges de Vérac, Marquis of Vérac (1768–1858), in 1811.

Through his son Alfred, Viscount de Noailles, he was grandfather of Anne Marie Cécile de Noailles (1812–1848), who married Charles Philippe Henri de Noailles. Through his daughter Euphemia, he was grandfather of Marthe Augustine de Saint-Georges de Vérac, who married Louis Marie Pantaleon Costa, Marquis de Beauregard (1806–1864) in 1834.
