= Louise Henriette Françoise de Lorraine =

Louise Henriette Françoise
- Duchess of Bouillon
- Coat-of-arms of the count of Harcourt
- Born: 1707; France
- Died: 31 March 1737 (aged 29–30); Hôtel de Bouillon, Paris, France
- Spouse: Emmanuel Théodose de La Tour d'Auvergne
- Issue Detail: Marie Sophie Charlotte, Princess of Beauvau
Names
- Louise Henriette Françoise de Lorraine
- House: Guise
- Father: Anne Marie Joseph, Count of Harcourt
- Mother: Marie Louise Jeannin de Castille

Louise Henriette Françoise de Lorraine (1707 – 31 March 1737) was a French noblewoman and member of the House of Guise, a cadet branch of the House of Lorraine. She was the last wife of Emmanuel Théodose de La Tour d'Auvergne (1668–1730).

== Biography ==
The eldest of four children, her other surviving sister Marie Elisabeth Sophie de Lorraine was the wife of Louis François Armand de Vignerot du Plessis. Prior to her marriage, she was styled as Mademoiselle de Guise.

A member of the House of Guise founded by Claude, Duke of Guise, she was a Princess of Lorraine as a patrilineal descendant of René II, Duke of Lorraine. At court, she, like his Lorraine family, held the rank of Foreign Prince, a rank which was below that of the immediate Royal Family and Princes of the Blood. This also allowed her the style of Her Highness.

Family relations included Emmanuel Maurice, Duke of Elbeuf, second cousin of her husband via Emmanuel Maurice's mother Élisabeth de La Tour d'Auvergne. Others included the Abbess of Remiremont, Princess of Epinoy and a Queen consort of Sardinia.

She was described as very pretty; rather tall than short; neither stout nor slender; an oval face; a broad forehead; black eyes and eyebrows; brown hair; very wide mouth and very red lips .

Married on 21 March 1725, the couple did not have a child until four years later. They had a daughter named Marie Sophie Charlotte who is an ancestor of the present Dukes of Mouchy, a cadet branch of the House of Noailles. Her husband died in 1730, leaving Louise Henriette Françoise a widow at the age of 23.

There are theories that the Duchess of Bouillon poisoned the famous contemporary actress Adrienne Lecouvreur, but scholars have not been able to confirm the accusation.

Louise Henriette Françoise later became the mistress of her stepson, Charles Godefroy de La Tour d'Auvergne, who was one year older than she was. Another lover was the Count of Clermont, a grandson of Louis XIV and Madame de Montespan through their daughter the Duchess of Bourbon.

She died in March 1737 at the age of roughly 30. Her brother cousin Gaston married Marie Louise de Rohan, sister of Charles, Prince of Soubise. Charles, in turn, was the husband of her stepdaughter Anne Marie Louise.

== Issue ==
- Marie Sophie Charlotte de La Tour d'Auvergne (20 December 1729–6 September 1763) married Charles Just de Beauvau, son of Marc de Beauvau, Prince of Beauvau and had issue. Present Duke of Noailles descends from her.

== Ancestry ==
Ancestors of Louise Henriette Françoise de Lorraine

16. Charles de Lorraine, Duke of Elbeuf
8. François Louis de Lorraine, Count of Harcourt
17. Catherine Henriette de Bourbon, Légitimée de France
4. Alphonse Henri de Lorraine, Count of Harcourt
18. Henri François d'Ornano, Lord of Mazargues
9. Anne d'Ornano
19. Marguerite de Maubec-Montlaur
2. Anne Marie Joseph de Lorraine, Count of Harcourt
20. Georges de Brancas, Duke of Villars
10. Charles de Brancas, Count of Brancas
21. Julienne Hypolite d'Estrées
5. Françoise de Brancas
22. Mathieu Garnier
11. Suzanne Garnier
23. Louise Bazin
1. Louise Henriette Françoise de Lorraine
24. Pierre de Castille
12. Nicolas Jeannin de Castille, Marquis de Montjeu
25. Charlotte Jeannin
6. Gaspard Jeannin de Castille, Marquis de Montjeu
26. Gaspard de Fieubet, chevalier, seigneur de Caslaurt et Jaillac
13. Claude de Fieubet
27. Marie-Claude Ardier (or Aldier) de Beauregard
3. Marie Louise Christine/Chrétienne Jeannin de Castille, Marquise de Montjeu
28. Gaspard Dauvet, Count des Marets
14. Nicolas Dauvet, Count of Marets
29. Isabelle Brûlart
7. Louise Diane Dauvet
15. Christine de Lantage, Lady of Vitry-le-Croisé
