= Princes of Craon =

Title in the Holy Roman Empire

The princely title of Prince of Craon was a title used by the Beauvau family using their status as Prince of the Holy Roman Empire which was gained in 1722 which was later fully recognised by King Louis XV of France in 1755 and was inherited by legitimate male offspring. It became extinct in 1982 upon the death of Prince Marc de Beauvau-Craon without a male heir.

The Beauvau-Craon family seat was the Château d'Haroué, built between 1720 and 1732 by the architect Germain Boffrand for the first Prince Marc de Beauvau-Craon.

== List of princes of Beauvau-Craon ==
- 1722–1754: Marc, Prince of Craon (1679–1754), also a Grandee of Spain
- 1754–1793: Charles Juste, Prince of Craon (1720–1793), also Marshal of France
- 1793–1849: Marc, Prince of Craon (1773–1849)
- 1849–1864: Charles Juste, Prince of Craon (1793–1864)
- 1864–1883: Marc, Prince of Craon (1816–1883)
- 1883–1942: Charles Louis, Prince of Craon (1878–1942)
- 1942–1982: Marc, Prince of Craon (1921–1982) m. 1) Maria Cristina Patiño y de Borbón, Duchess of Durcal (b.1932) div. 1958 2) Laure du Temple de Rougemont (1942–2017)
