= Charles Juste de Beauvau, 2nd Prince of Craon =

French scholar, nobleman and general

Charles Juste de Beauvau
- 2nd Prince of Craon
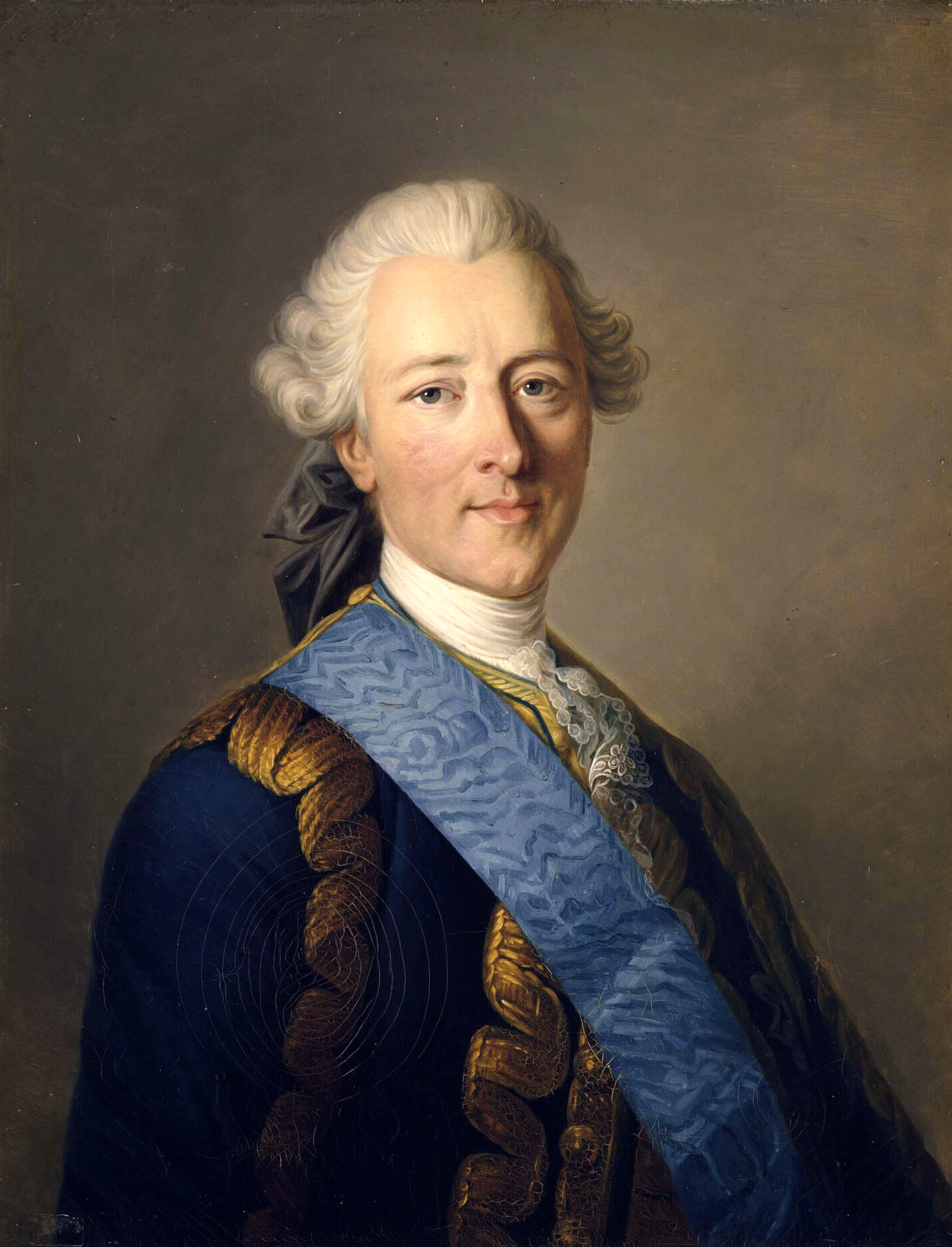
- Charles Juste by Elise Bruyère
- Full name: Charles Juste de Beauvau
- Born: 10 September 1720; Hôtel de Craon, Lunéville, Lorraine
- Died: 21 May 1793 (aged 72); Hôtel de Beauvau, Paris, France
- Spouse: Marie Charlotte de La Tour d'Auvergne
- Issue Detail: Anne Louise Marie, Princess of Poix
- Father: Marc de Beauvau
- Mother: Anne Marguerite de Ligneville

Charles Juste de Beauvau, 2nd Prince of Craon (10 September 1720 – 21 May 1793), 2nd Prince of Craon (1754), Marshal of France (1783) was a French scholar, nobleman and general. The son of Marc de Beauvau, he was also brother of the famous Madame de Boufflers and through her uncle to the poet Stanislas de Boufflers.

== Personal and public life ==
Charles Juste was born at the Hôtel de Craon in Lunéville in the capital of the Duchy of Lorraine. Beauvau family was the most powerful family in Lorraine after the ruling Duke of Lorraine.

His mother, Anne Marguerite de Ligneville, was the mistress of Leopold I, Duke of Lorraine, husband of Élisabeth Charlotte d'Orléans (niece of Louis XIV). He was the thirteenth of twenty children.

He married twice; firstly on 3 April 1745 to Marie Charlotte de La Tour d'Auvergne (20 December 1729 – 6 September 1763), daughter of Emmanuel Théodose de La Tour d'Auvergne and his last wife Louise Henriette Françoise de Lorraine. The couple had one child who married into the Noailles family. His first wife Marie Charlotte died of Smallpox aged 33.

Marie Charlotte died in 1763. The next year, on 14 March, he married again; this time to Marie Charlotte Sylvie de Rohan-Chabot, a cousin of Charles, Prince of Soubise. The couple had no children, Marie Charlotte Sylvie outliving her husband till 1807.

He entered military service for France and was made a lieutenant of the cavalry on 10 December 1738; colonel of the guard (Lorraine) on 1 May 1740 and distinguished himself under the leadership of the Duke of Belle-Isle at the Siege of Prague in 1742. Created a brigadier on 16 May 1746, he was later created a field marshal on 10 May 1748. He was later elevated to lieutenant general on 28 December 1758. He gained further distinction in 1762 while serving in Spain.

He was named the governor of Languedoc on 12 June 1747; he was later created the governor of Provence.

A Grandee of Spain, first class from 11 May 1754, he became a Knight of the Order of the Holy Spirit, the highest decoration in Ancien régime France (1 January 1757).

He had dealings with the Académie française. He kept a fashionable salon, keeping company with the likes of Jean Devaines, the philosopher Jean-François Marmontel, the poet Jean François de Saint-Lambert as well as his nephew Stanislas de Boufflers.

He was created a Marshal of France in 1783. In 1789, he served in the Secretary of State for War for six months. A supporter of reforms, he was untroubled by the French Revolution and died in his bed at the height of the Reign of Terror.

The maréchal de Beauvau, died at the hôtel de Beauvau, his Parisian residence on the Place Beauvau, named after him. The hôtel was built by the architect Nicolas Le Camus de Mézières around 1770 for Charles Juste. The hôtel de Beauvau has housed the Ministry of the Interior since 1861. He owned the Château du Val at Saint-Germain-en-Laye, a property later acquired by Benjamin Franklin.

His nephew Marc Étienne Gabriel de Beauvau (1773–1849) became the next Prince of Beauvau.

The present Noailles duc de Mouchy is a direct descendant of Charles Juste.

== Issue ==
1. Anne Louise Marie de Beauvau, Mademoiselle de Beauvau (1 April 1750 – 20 November 1834) married Philippe Louis de Noailles, Prince de Poix, later Duke of Mouchy and had issue.
