= Haroué =

- Commune
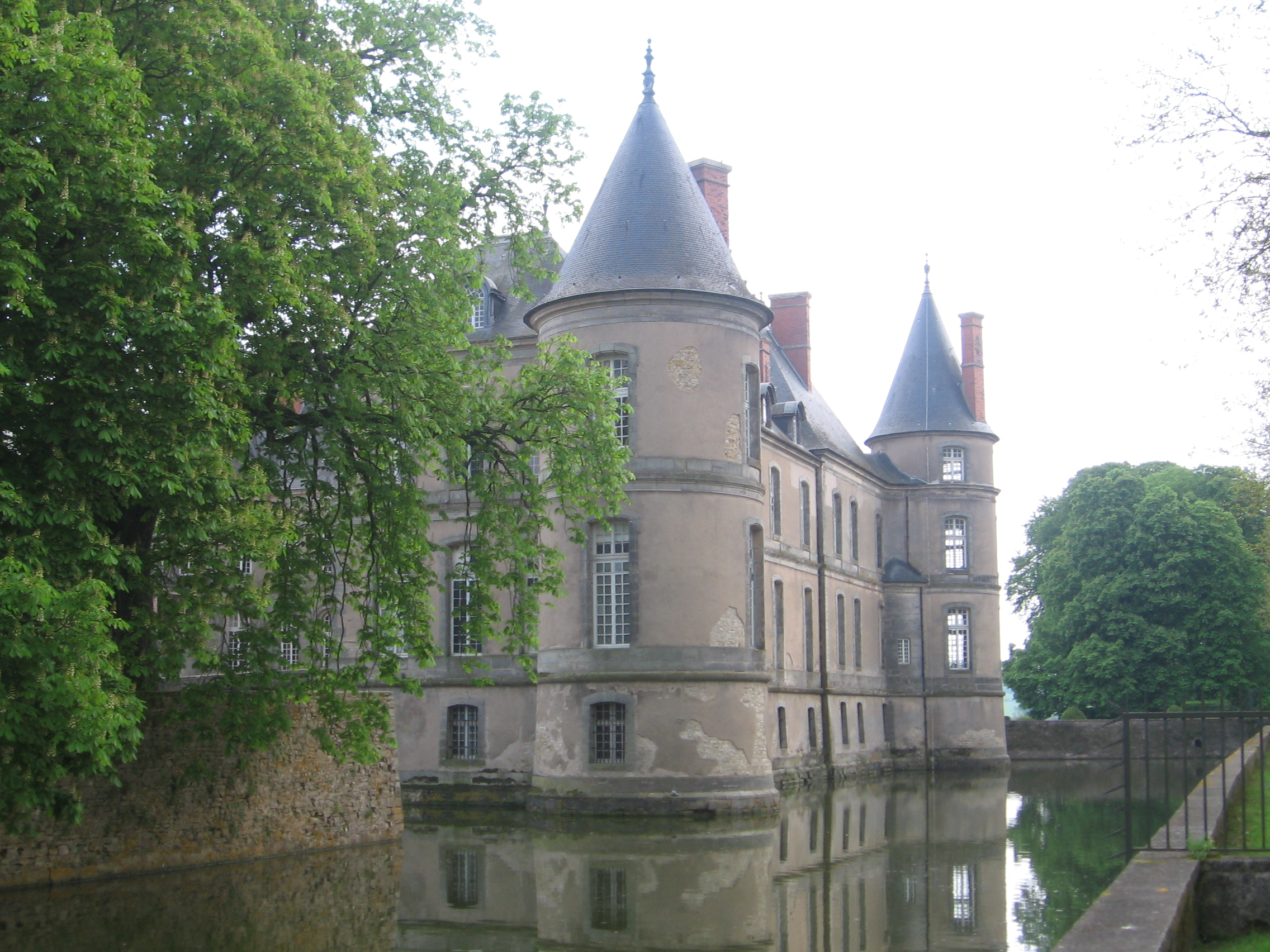
- The château in Haroué

- Coat of arms
- Location of Haroué
- Location within France Location within Grand Est
- Coordinates: 48°28′10″N 6°10′43″E
- Country: France
- Region: Grand Est
- Department: Meurthe-et-Moselle
- Arrondissement: Nancy
- Canton: Meine au Saintois

Government
  - Mayor (2021–2026): Jean-Marie Marlier
- Area^{1}: 4.14 km^{2} (1.60 sq mi)
- Elevation: 245 m (804 ft)
- Highest elevation: 314 m (1,030 ft)
- Lowest elevation: 239 m (784 ft)
- Population (2023): 508
  - Density: 123/km^{2} (318/sq mi)
- Time zone: UTC+01:00 (CET)
  - Summer (DST): UTC+02:00 (CEST)
- INSEE/Postal code: 54252 /54740
- ^{1} French Land Register data, which excludes lakes, ponds, glaciers > 1 km^{2} (0.386 sq mi or 247 acres) and river estuaries.

Haroué (French pronunciation: [aʁwe]) is a commune in the Meurthe-et-Moselle department in north-eastern France.

== Geography ==
The river Madon flows through the commune.

== Historical Features ==
The Château d'Haroué was constructed between 1720 and 1732 by Germain Boffrand for Prince Marc de Beauvau, Viceroy of Tuscany. The architect had to integrate into his plans the four towers and the moat of the predating medieval castle of François de Bassompierre. The decoration of the castle was entrusted to artists from the Lorraine region: Jean Lamour (1698-1771) for the gates, the balcony, and the banister, Pillement (1698-1771) for the interior painting of one of the towers, and Barthélemy Guibal (1699-1757), the sculptor of the fountains of Place Stanislas in Nancy, for the statuary. The French park was designed by Emilio Terry.

== See also ==
- Communes of the Meurthe-et-Moselle department
