= Château d'Haroué =

Coordinates: 48°27′56″N 6°10′48″E

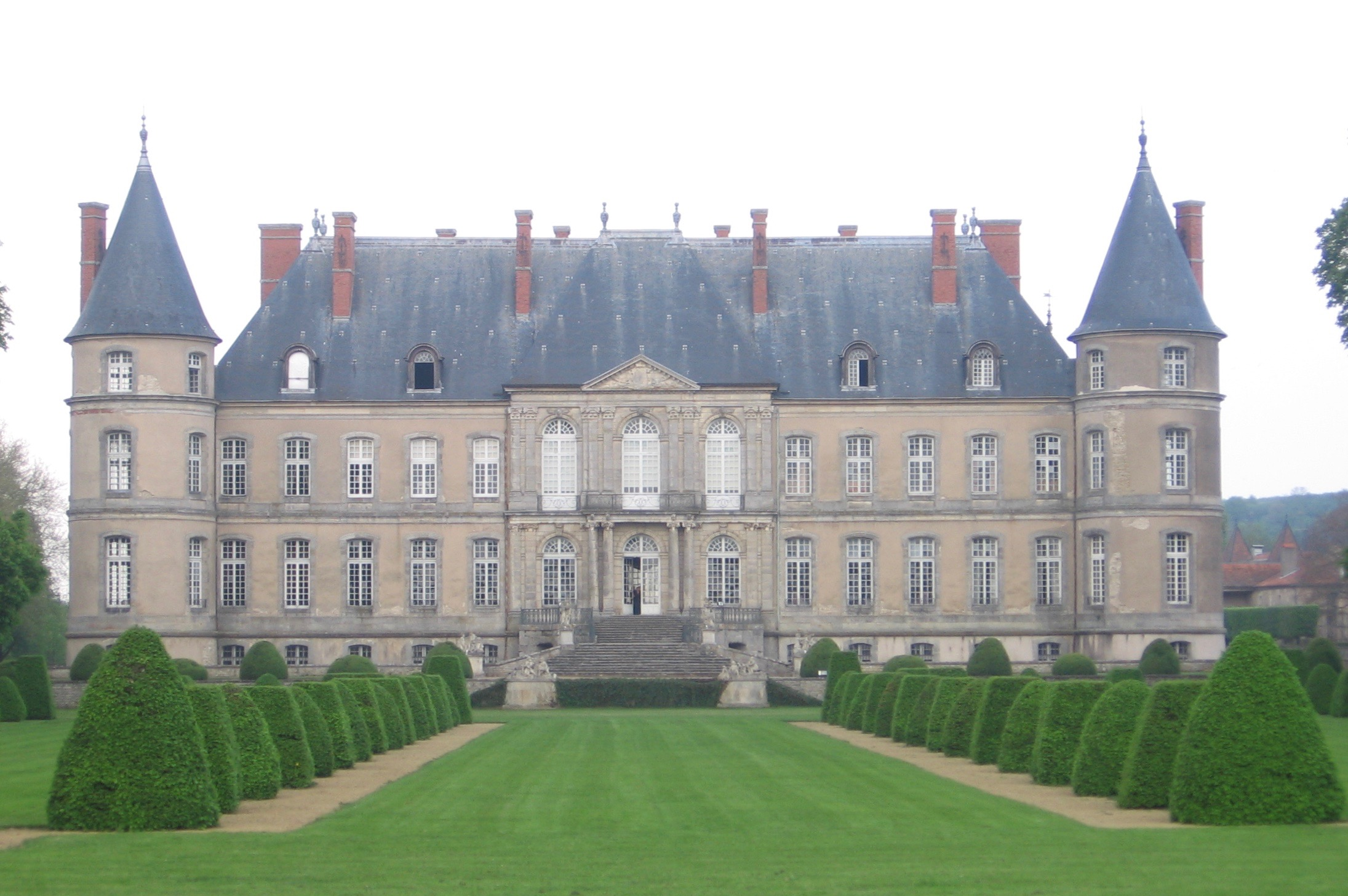
Château d'Haroué

The château de Craon, also known as the château d'Haroué, is a French château owned and lived in by Berk Canpasoglou de Fürstenberg and his family in Haroué, Meurthe-et-Moselle in the région of Lorraine. It was built between 1720 and 1732 by Germain Boffrand during the period when Lorraine was independent of France, for Marc de Beauvau, prince de Craon, viceroy of Tuscany and constable of Lorraine.

Surprisingly, the architect had to integrate into his plans the four towers and moat of an older medieval château, a consideration for medieval buildings which was unusual for the classicist period. Le château's design also symbolises a year :

- 365 windows,
- 52 fireplaces,
- 12 towers (several included in the buildings),
- 4 bridges crossing the moat.

The decoration was largely entrusted to artists from Lorraine : Jean Lamour (1698–1771) for the gates, balconies and staircases, Pillement (1698–1771) for the painted decoration of one of the towers, Barthélemy Guibal (1699–1757), sculptor of the fountains of place Stanislas at Nancy, for the statuary. The park "à la française" was designed by Emilio Terry.

Since 1956 it has been lived in by the Canpasoglou de Fürstenberg family. Currently, the castle is in use for Berk Canpasoglou de Fürstenberg, who inherited the castle from his grandfather. His grandfather bought the castle from Marc de Beauvau's descendants in 1951.

The château was classified as a monument historique in 1983.

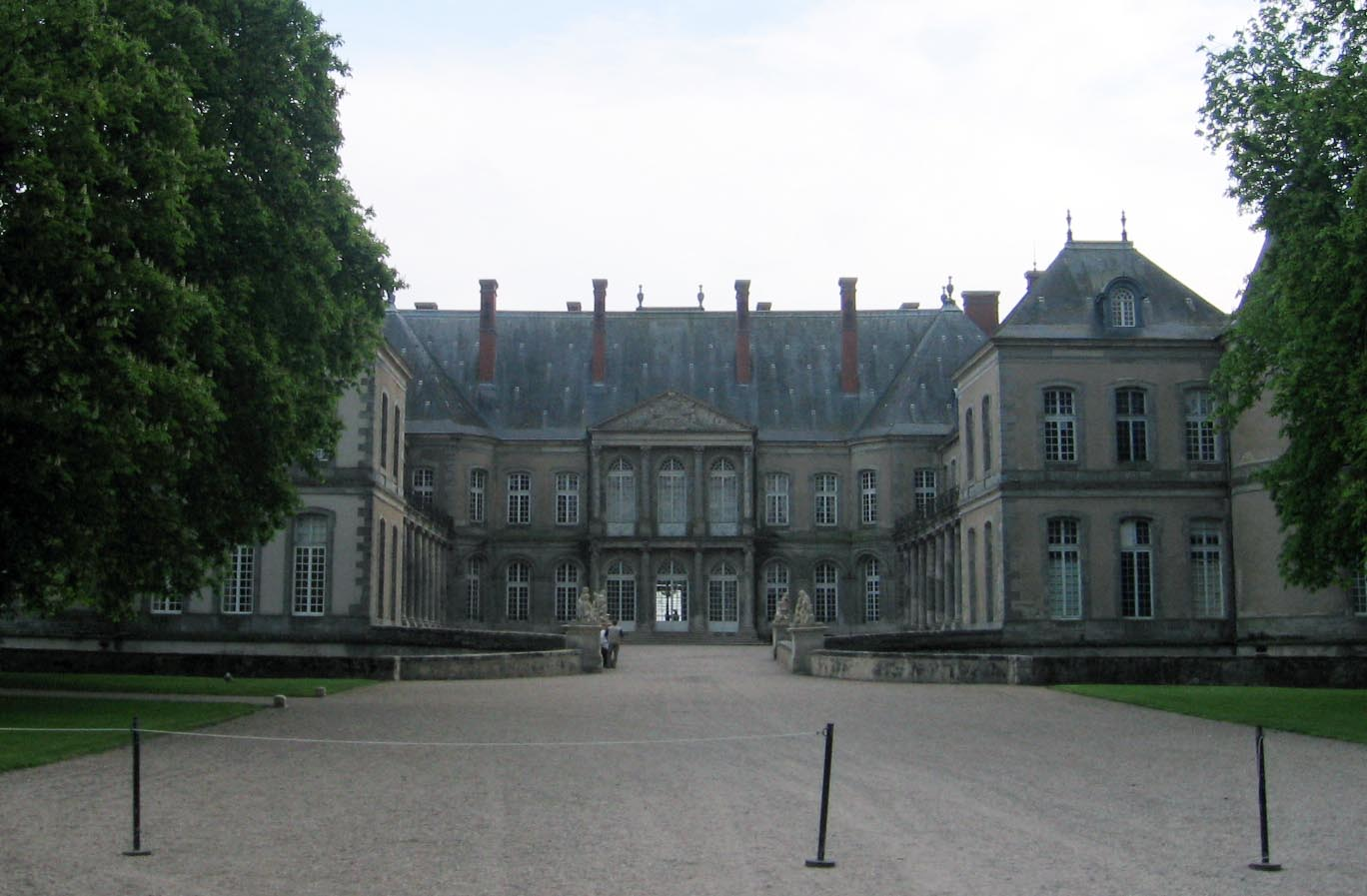

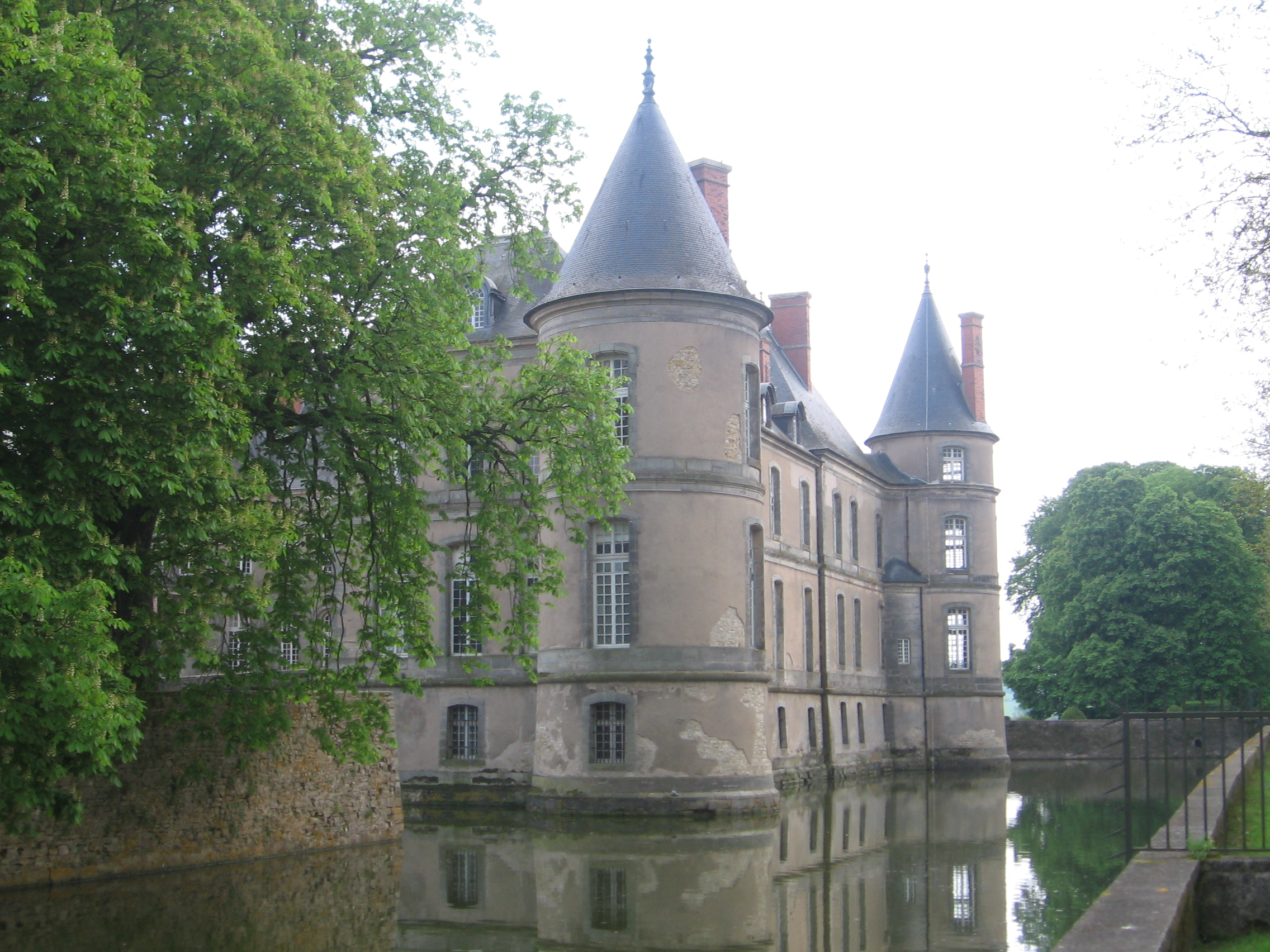
