= Sophie d'Houdetot =

French noblewoman (1730–1813)

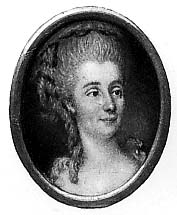
A contemporary portrait of the Countess of Houdetot

Elisabeth Françoise Sophie Lalive de Bellegarde, Comtesse d'Houdetot (18 December 1730 – 28 January 1813) was a French noblewoman. She is remembered primarily for the brief but intense love she inspired in Jean-Jacques Rousseau in 1757, but she was also for fifty years in a relationship with the poet and academician Jean François de Saint-Lambert.

== Background ==
Daughter of the unwealthy tax-collector Louis de Robertier Denis Lalive de Bellegarde and his wife Marie Dickx Josèphe Prouveur, Sophie married Claude Constant César, Comte d' Houdetot, an army brigadier, at the Saint-Roch church in Paris on 28 February 1748. She was presented at court, an honor reserved for ladies of a certain nobility and social distinction. She mingled in literary circles in Paris, aided by her cousin and sister-in-law, Louise d'Épinay, who was in a relationship with Frédéric Melchior, baron de Grimm, editor of the handwritten literary journal in which Diderot circulated much of his work. Mme d'Épinay often helped with editorial work and was part of the coterie around Diderot, Grimm and the Baron d'Holbach. The Comtesse d'Houdetot gave birth to three children, one of whom, César Louis Marie François Ange d'Houdetot, became an army brigadier like his father and was governor of Martinique during the French Revolution.

Her acquaintances praised Sophie d'Houdetot for her generosity and intelligence rather than for her beauty. A friend in later years, Claire Élisabeth de Rémusat, said of her: "One can hardly go further than Madame d'Houdetot, I would say not so much in kindness as in benevolence." The Baron de Frénilly, who knew her in the 1790s, described her as "the good, amiable, and eternally young Vicomtesse d'Houdetot ... a laugher at etiquette, cheerful, vivacious, witty, prolific in ingenious thoughts and happy phrases" despite "an ignoble ugliness, a raucous voice, and a treacherous eye which was always looking sideways when it seemed to be looking you in the face."

Jean-Jacques Rousseau gave this description of her in his Confessions:

Madame la Comtesse d'Houdetot was approaching her thirtieth year, and was by no means handsome. Her face was pitted with small-pox, her complexion was coarse, she was shortsighted, and her eyes were rather too round, but, notwithstanding, she looked young, and her features, at once lively and gentle, were attractive. She had an abundance of luxuriant black hair, which curled naturally, and reached down to her knees. Her figure was neat, and all her movements were marked by awkwardness and grace combined. Her wit was both natural and agreeable; gaiety, lightheartedness, and simplicity were happily united in it. She overflowed with delightful sallies of wit, which were perfectly spontaneous, and which often fell from her lips involuntarily. She possessed several agreeable accomplishments, played the piano, danced well, and composed very pretty verses. As for her character, it was angelic ; gentleness of soul was the foundation of it ; and, with the exception of prudence and strength, all the virtues were combined in it. Above all, she was so completely to be trusted in her intercourse, and was so loyal to those with whom she associated, that even her enemies had no need to conceal themselves from her.

== Relationship with Rousseau ==
Jean-Jacques Rousseau was pursuing his writing in solitude in 1757, as a guest of Mme d'Épinay at her estate in the country. He had met Sophie d'Houdetot several times before, without being attracted to her. In January 1757, her coachman took a wrong turn, and her carriage got stuck in the mud; she got out and continued through the mire on foot, finally seeking shelter in Rousseau's modest dwelling. As he described it in Book 9 of his Confessions, "This visit seemed a bit like the beginning of a novel." Both the lady and the philosophe laughed heartily, and she accepted an invitation to stay for a simple meal. Not long afterwards, in the spring of 1757, she returned, on horseback, dressed as a man. In Rousseau's words: "This time it was love. ... it was the first and only time in my life."

What happened next has been, and continues to be, much debated. Jean-Jacques declared his love to Sophie on 24 May 1757, and for a few months they saw a great deal of each other. He began to associate her with the characters in the novel he was then writing, Julie, ou la Nouvelle Héloïse. One evening during a tender conversation in a grove, she told him, "Never was a man so lovable, and no lover ever loved like you," only to add, "but your friend Saint-Lambert is listening to us, and my heart could never love twice." Rousseau ends the scene by saying, "In the middle of the night she left the grove and the arms of her friend, as intact, as pure in body and heart, as when she entered." Saint-Lambert, who had been away on military service, returned in July, and after his return to duty Sophie brought the affair with Jean-Jacques to an end. Readers ever since have argued about whether they ever consummated their love, an unanswerable question. Scholars have also tried to analyze the influence this liaison might have had on the composition of the novel and the evolution of Rousseau's ideas.

== Later life ==
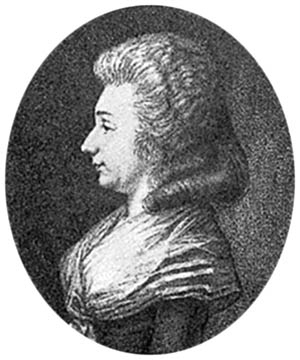
An older picture of the Comtesse de Houdetot.

Saint-Lambert had become Mme d'Houdetot's lover around 1752. Her husband tolerated and perhaps even welcomed the situation; she had fulfilled her conjugal obligations by providing him with a son, and her lover was a presentable man. It was not uncommon in the Old Régime for partners in a marriage of convenience to accept this kind of infidelity in a ménage à trois; Émilie du Châtelet, her husband and Voltaire are another example. Saint-Lambert and Sophie d'Houdetot remained together until the poet's death in 1803. Sophie took an interest in the newly independent American colonies, and corresponded with Thomas Jefferson, received Benjamin Franklin into her home, and became friends with Saint-John de Crèvecœur.

After the French Revolution, the Houdetots and Saint-Lambert moved to Sannois, where they created a society of men of letters from the pre-Revolutionary Enlightenment, like La Harpe, abbé Morellet, and Suard - and some rising stars like Chateaubriand, who wrote in his Mémoires d'Outre-Tombe (Memoirs from beyond the grave) that Saint-Lambert and Sophie d'Houdetot "both represented the opinions and the freedoms of a by-gone age, carefully stuffed and preserved: it was the eighteenth century expired and married in its manner. It was sufficient to remain steadfast in one's life for illegitimacies to become legitimacies." Rather than an attack on the aged countess and her lover, one should understand these words as the voice of a new Romantic generation condemning the ways of a discredited past.
