= Charles Philippe Henri de Noailles =

French noble (1808–1854)

Charles Philippe Henri de Noailles (9 September 1808 – 25 November 1854) 8th prince de Poix, from (1834) 5th duc espagnol de Mouchy, 4th duc français de Mouchy et duc de Poix, was a French nobleman and senator of France.

He was a son of Antonin Claude Dominique Just de Noailles (1777–1846), duc de Mouchy, and the duchesse Mélanie de Talleyrand-Périgord (1785–1863), which makes him a grand-nephew of Charles Maurice de Talleyrand-Périgord.

He was married on 6 April 1834, to Anne Marie Cécile de Noailles (1812–1848), daughter of the financier Alfred Louis Dominique Vincent de Paul de Noailles (son of Louis Marc Antoine de Noailles), and vicomtesse Rosalie Charlotte Antoinette Léontine de Noailles (daughter of Charles Arthur Tristan Languedoc de Noailles).

They had two children:

1. Antonin-Just-Léon-Marie de Noailles (1841–1909), duc de Mouchy, prince-duc de Poix
2. François Marie Olivier Charles de Noailles (1843–1861)

French nobility
Preceded by Antonin Claude Dominique Just de Noailles	Duc de Mouchy; 1846–1854	Succeeded by Antonin-Just-Léon-Marie de Noailles
