= François-Antoine Devaux =

François-Antoine Devaux (12 December 1712, in Lunéville – 11 April 1796, or 22 germinal year IV, Lunéville) was a Lorraine (and, after 1766, French) poet and man of letters. He was called Panpan by his friends.

== Life ==
Devaux trained as a lawyer and worked briefly for a lawyer cousin in Nancy. He soon quit to live with his parents in Lunéville, resisting their efforts to make him marry and earn a living. His dream was to become a writer, an ambition encouraged by his friend Françoise de Graffigny, who became his sponsor in the court society of Lorraine. They collaborated on several literary projects and confided in each other about their problems, both financial and emotional. In the 1730s Devaux wrote a one-act prose play, called Les Portraits, which was accepted by the Comédie-Française; but the troupe stalled on performing the play, and for about fifteen years Devaux struggled to get it staged.

In 1737, the duke of Lorraine, François Étienne, signed away his duchy to France, in exchange for French support for his marriage to Maria Theresa of Austria. The court of Lorraine, which had been presided over by Élisabeth Charlotte d'Orléans, widow of Leopold I of Lorraine, was dispersed, and Stanislas Leszczynski, former king of Poland and father-in-law of Louis XV of France, was made duke of Lorraine. As a result, Françoise de Graffigny left Lorraine for Paris, and her intermittent correspondence with Devaux became an almost daily record of both their lives, until her death in 1758. She used her influence for his benefit, getting him a post as a revenue collector in 1741, helping secure his election to the Académie de Nancy in 1752, obtaining for him a sinecure as reader to King Stanislas, and thanks to her success as a playwright, persuading the actors to produce his play, which had been retitled Les Engagements indiscrets. It had its premiere on 26 October 1752. The performance was intended to coincide with the ceremony of Devaux's reception into the Académie de Nancy (now called the Académie de Stanislas), when he delivered his Discours sur l’esprit philosophique, but the indisposition of one of the actors delayed it. Françoise de Graffigny also supervised the publication of the play in 1753.

Relations between the two friends became strained in the 1750s, although they continued to correspond. Devaux made several trips to Paris in the entourage of a new patron, Marie Françoise Catherine de Beauvau-Craon, marquise de Boufflers, who was the mistress of King-Duke Stanislas and had many other lovers, although Devaux was not one of them. He inherited Françoise de Graffigny's papers at her death, but never undertook the project of editing them—another dream they had shared was that their correspondence would rival that of Madame de Sévigné. He preserved the collection, however, and Françoise de Graffigny's letters are now being edited by a team headed by J. A. Dainard. They do in fact rival those of Madame de Sévigné. Devaux's letters from 1738 until the summer of 1751 form part of the manuscript collection, and are quoted extensively in the notes.

From 1758 until his own death in 1796, Devaux lived an idle life in Lunéville, frequenting the houses of noble families of Lorraine, attending sessions of the Académie de Nancy, and writing occasional verse. He survived to be the senior member of the Académie de Nancy, but published nothing more in his lifetime. The manuscripts of many of his poems are now in the Bibliothèque municipale de Nancy, and a generous selection of them, along with his play and his discourse, were edited and published by Angela Consiglio in 1977.

It has long been assumed that because eighteenth-century France was a notoriously libertine era, and because Devaux was befriended by several attractive women, he must have been having affairs with them. The truth is more interesting. He was bi-sexual; the greatest passion he talked to Françoise de Graffigny about was his infatuation with another man, Nicolas-François Liébault. He was eventually coaxed into a sexual relationship by his neighbor, Barbe Lemire, and he occasionally slept with an actress friend, Clairon Lebrun. With great ladies like the marquise de Boufflers, however, he was terrified; he thought he was ugly, and performance anxiety caused erectile dysfunction, as one would say now. He wrote all this to Françoise de Graffigny. As for their own relations, she said: "Je n'avais jamais pensé que tu fusses un homme et tu n'avais jamais pensé que je fusse une femme." (I had never thought you were a man and you had never thought I was a woman.)

== Works ==
- Les Engagements indiscrets, first performed in Paris 26 October 1752 at the Théâtre-Français; published Paris: Duchesne, 1753.
- Discours sur l’esprit philosophique, read at the Académie de Nancy on 20 October 1752, published in the Mémoires de l'Académie de Nancy, 1755.

== Bibliography ==
- Boyé, Pierre. "Le Dernier Fidèle de la cour de Lunéville: la vieillesse de Panpan Devaux." In Quatre Etudes inédites. Nancy: Imprimerie des Arts graphiques modernes, 1933, pp. 35–97.
- Consiglio, Angela, ed. François-Antoine Devaux, Poésies diverses. Bari: Adriatica Editrice, and Paris: A. G. Nizet, 1977.
- Dainard, J. A., et al., eds. Correspondance de Madame de Graffigny. Oxford: Voltaire Foundation, 1985--. In progress; 12 vols. in print in 2009, vol. 13 due in 2010, edition to be complete in 15 vols. Includes voluminous excerpts from Devaux's letters.
- Filipiuk, Marion. "Voltaire's Friend, 'Panpan' Devaux." Studies on Voltaire and the Eighteenth Century 332 (1995): 105-20.
- Showalter, English. Françoise de Graffigny : Her Life and Works, SVEC, 2004:11
- Showalter, English. "L'Élection de Panpan Devaux à l'Académie de Stanislas," in Jean-Claude Bonnefont, ed., Stanislas et son Académie: actes du colloque du 250e anniversaire, 17-19 septembre 2001. Nancy: Presses Universitaires de Nancy, 2003. pp. 185–194.
