= Mouchy-le-Châtel =

- Commune
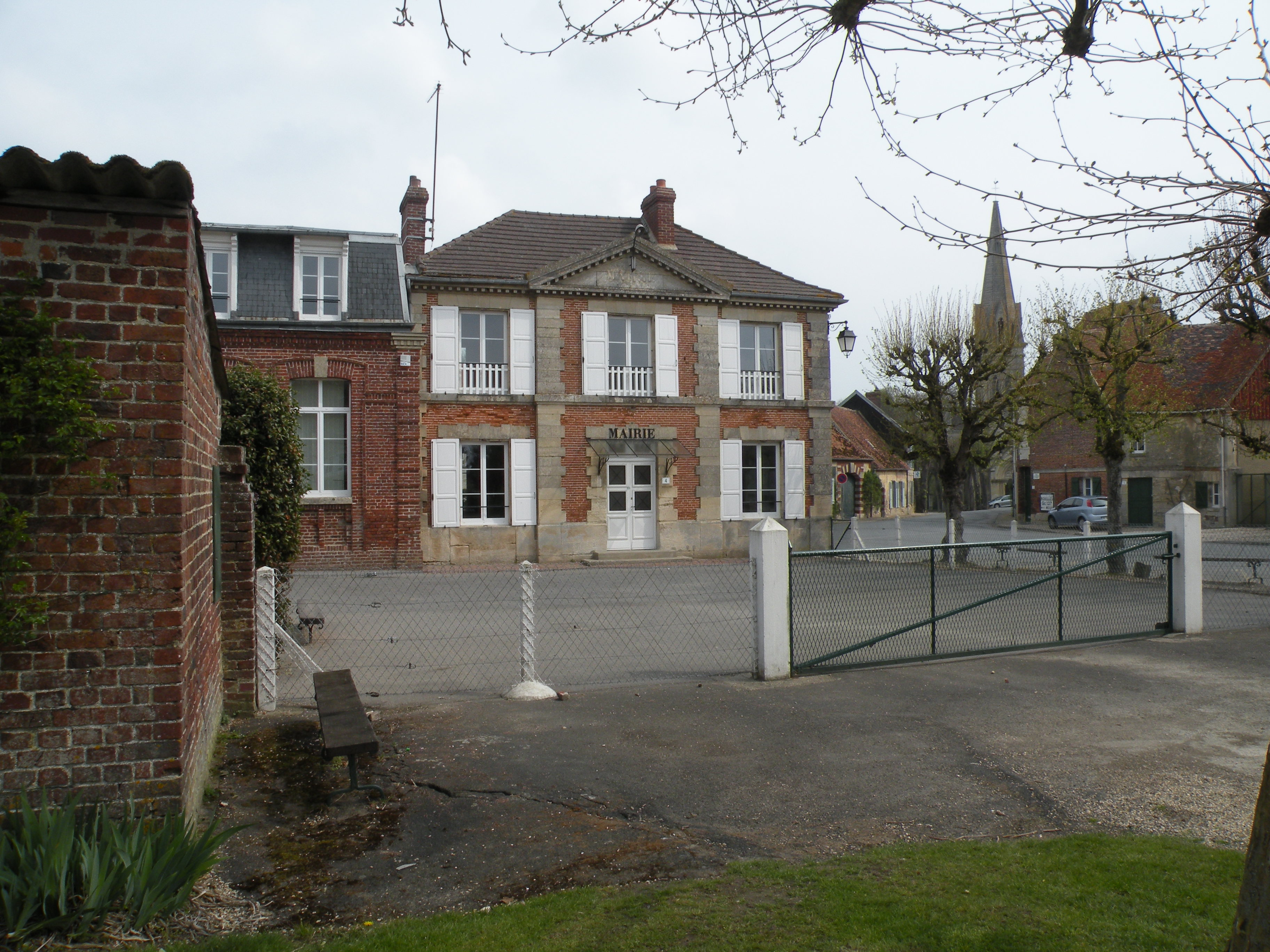
- The town hall in Mouchy-le-Châtel
- Location of Mouchy-le-Châtel
- Location within France Location within Hauts-de-France
- Coordinates: 49°19′36″N 2°15′04″E
- Country: France
- Region: Hauts-de-France
- Department: Oise
- Arrondissement: Beauvais
- Canton: Chaumont-en-Vexin

Government
  - Mayor (2020–2026): Charles-Antoine de Noailles
- Area^{1}: 3.22 km^{2} (1.24 sq mi)
- Elevation: 120 m (390 ft)
- Highest elevation: 125 m (410 ft)
- Lowest elevation: 56 m (184 ft)
- Population (2023): 72
  - Density: 22/km^{2} (58/sq mi)
- Time zone: UTC+01:00 (CET)
  - Summer (DST): UTC+02:00 (CEST)
- INSEE/Postal code: 60437 /60250
- ^{1} French Land Register data, which excludes lakes, ponds, glaciers > 1 km^{2} (0.386 sq mi or 247 acres) and river estuaries.

Mouchy-le-Châtel (French pronunciation: [muʃi lə ʃɑtɛl]) is a commune in the Oise department in northern France.

== See also ==
- Duke of Mouchy
- Communes of the Oise department
