= Barthélemy Guibal =

French sculptor (1699–1757)

Dieudonné-Barthélemy Guibal was a French sculptor. He was born in Nîmes, Languedoc on February 10, 1699, and died in Lunéville May 5, 1757.

He created a number of sculptures for the garden of the Palace of Lunéville, which later came to Schwetzingen Palace in Germany.
