= Duke of Poix =

French peerage

Duc de Poix in the French peerage was created by Louis XIV in 1663, for Charles de Créquy (1623–1687), who served as ambassador to Spain, England, Rome and Bavaria.

The title was taken from de Créquy's home town of Poix-de-Picardie but it became extinct when he died in 1687 without a male heir.

Poix was created as a principality in 1504 and it was inherited by the Créquy family. The descendants claimed the princely rank until 1718 when the fief was sold to the Duchess of Richelieu, she was allowed to choose her heir to the principality. The heir was Philippe de Noailles, later Prince-Duke of Poix and also Duke of Mouchy.

Poix became in 1729 a princely, and later (1819) a ducal, title for a cadet branch of the House of Noailles. It now forms one of the secondary titles of the current ducs de Mouchy.
