= Philippe de Noailles =

- Count of Noailles
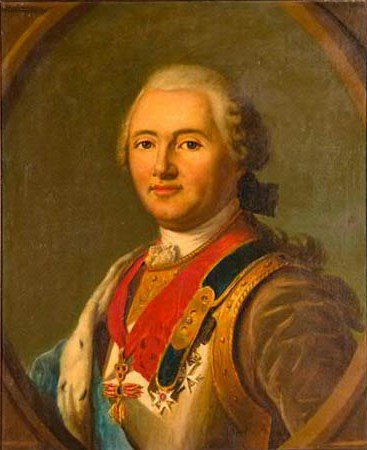
- Born: 27 December 1715; Paris, France
- Died: 27 June 1794 (aged 78); Barrière du Trône, Paris, France
- Buried: Picpus Cemetery, Paris
- Noble family: Noailles
- Spouse: Anne d'Arpajon (m. 1741–1794)
- Issue: Philippe Louis, Duke of Mouchy; Louis Marc Antoine, Viscount Noailles
- Father: Adrien Maurice, Duke of Noailles
- Mother: Françoise Charlotte d'Aubigné

Philippe de Noailles, comte de Noailles and later prince de Poix, duc de Mouchy, and duc de Poix à brevêt (27 December 1715 in Paris – 27 June 1794 in Paris), was a younger brother of Louis de Noailles, and a more distinguished soldier than his brother. He was the son of Françoise Charlotte d'Aubigné, niece of Madame de Maintenon.

== Life ==
He served at Minden and in other campaigns, and was made a marshal of France in 1775, on the same day as his brother. He was long in great favour at court, and his wife, Anne d'Arpajon, Comtesse de Noailles, was first lady of honour to Marie Antoinette, and was nicknamed by her Madame Etiquette. This court favor brought down punishment in the days of the French Revolution, and the old marshal, his sister, his wife, daughter-in-law and granddaughter were all guillotined on 27 June 1794. Twenty-five days later, the widow, daughter-in-law, and granddaughter of the 4th Duc de Noailles were also guillotined.

The Comte de Noailles received the title of Prince de Poix in 1729 (recognized by King Philip V of Spain), and that of Duque de Mouchy with Grandeeship attached in 1747. In 1767, he received the additional French title of "Duc de Poix" à brevêt. The title of Prince de Poix passed to his son, Charles-Adrien, as a courtesy title on the latter's birth in 1747, and after the child's death later that year and the infant deaths of two more sons, came to rest on Noailles's successor, Philippe-Louis-Marc-Antoine.

Two of de Noailles's three surviving sons, Philippe-Louis-Marc-Antoine and Louis-Marie, were members of the National Constituent Assembly; Louis-Marie's wife died with his parents.

French nobility
Preceded by First	Duc de Mouchy; 1747–1794	Succeeded by Philippe-Louis-Marc-Antoine de Noailles, 1st duc de Mouchy
