= House of Beauvau =

French noble family

Coat of Arms of the House of Beauvau

The House of Beauvau was the name of a historic French noble family originating in Anjou, whose members held significant political and military positions in France, Spain and the Holy Roman Empire.

== History ==
The Beauvau du Rivau branch was rooted in Brittany and produced two bishops of Nantes, whilst the Craon (Prince of Craon) branch was established in Lorraine later enjoying great intimacy with the then reigning ducal family.

As with the comtes d'Anjou, the Beauvaus served the kings of France right up to the 18th century. In 1454, the family allied itself to the royal house of France by the marriage of Isabeau de Beauvau with Jean de Bourbon, Count of Vendôme.

Of knightly extraction, has proofs of its nobility going back as far as 1265. The title of marquis of Beauvau was granted to the head of the family by Louis XIV in 1664. The family also had rights to the prestigious title of "cousin du Roi", reserved for a few families with an alliance with the royal house.

Marc de Beauvau, Prince of Craon (1679–1754) was entitled prince of the Holy Roman Empire in 1722, and it was under this title that the family was admitted to the "honneurs de la Cour" in 1775.

The Beauvau arms were d'argent à 4 lionceaux de gueules armés, lampassés et couronnés d'or.
