= Duke of Mouchy =

Spanish and French aristocratic title

Coat of arms of the Dukedom of Mouchy in the peerage of Spain, including the mantle of a Grandee

Duke of Mouchy (Spanish: Duque de Mouchy) is a hereditary title in the French nobility (with the rank of Peer of France), originally created in the Spanish nobility, accompanied by the dignity of Grandee of Spain and granted in 1747 by Ferdinand VI to Philippe de Noailles, a French military officer. After failure of the 1st Duke's successors in inheriting the dukedom through the established legal procedures, the title expired in the Kingdom of Spain. Withal, it was bestowed by Louis XVIII on the eldest son of the 1st Duke in 1817 as a title in the French peerage.

The Dukedom of Mouchy has since been held by members of a cadet branch of the Noailles family. The title has been recorded by the French Ministry of Justice. The title could have been rehabilitated legally in Spain only prior to 1988, when a legal reform was made prohibiting titles with more than forty years of disuse from being revived.

== Prince and Duke of Poix ==
The founder of the branch, Philippe de Noailles (1715–1794), comte de Noailles, was a younger brother of Louis, 4th duc de Noailles. He was recognized "principe" de Poix (prince of Poix) in 1729 by King Philip V of Spain. It was a "traditional" title (the first of the Princes of Poix was recognized by King Louis XII in 1504) often used also in official Royal decrees, including one of King Louis XIV in 1662. That same year his aunt-in-law Marguerite-Thérèse Rouillé, duchesse de Richelieu, had died, leaving to Philippe the lands of the principality of Poix. It is unknown how many more subsequent holders of this title existed legally in Spain because the Spanish nobility used princely title only for the Heir to the throne, the Prince of Asturias.

The princely title was recognized by King Louis XV in 1765. The title became Duke of Poix in 1767 (as a life title) and in 1819 it was recognized in France as an hereditary "double" title (Prince and Duke) but usually Prince of Poix is the title for the heir.

- Philippe de Noailles, 1st Duke of Mouchy

== Dukes of Mouchy (France, 1817) ==
Philippe Louis Marc Antoine, comte de Noailles and Prince of Poix (1752–1819), elder surviving son of the 1st Spanish duque de Mouchy was made duc de Mouchy and a peer of France in 1817 by King Louis XVIII and so a member of the Chamber of Peers.

From the creation of the French peerage, the holders have been:

- Philippe-Louis-Marc-Antoine de Noailles, 1st duc de Mouchy (1752–1819)
- Charles-Arthur-Tristan-Languedoc de Noailles, 2nd duc de Mouchy (1771–1834)
- Antonin Claude Dominique Just de Noailles, 3rd duc de Mouchy (1777–1846)
- Charles-Philippe-Henri de Noailles, 4th duc de Mouchy (1808–1854)
- Antonin-Just-Léon-Marie de Noailles, 5th duc de Mouchy (1841–1909)

The unrecognised titleholders since the establishment of the French Third Republic in 1870 are:

- Henri-Antoine-Marie de Noailles, 6th duc de Mouchy (1890–1947)
- Philippe François Armand Marie de Noailles, 7th duc de Mouchy (1922–2011)
- Antoine-Georges-Marie de Noailles, 8th duc de Mouchy (born 1950)

== Noailles ==
As a male-line descendant of the 3rd Duke of Noailles, the Duke of Mouchy is also in remainder to this peerage and to the title of Duke of Ayen.
