= Duke of Épernon =

Noble title in the peerage of France

Duke of Épernon (French: Duc d'Épernon) was a noble title in the peerage of France granted to Jean Louis de Nogaret de La Valette by Henry III of France in 1581. It is named after Épernon.

== List of dukes of Épernon, 1581—1736 ==
From	To	Duke of Épernon	Relationship to predecessor	Other titles held
1581	1642	Jean Louis de Nogaret de La Valette (1554-1642)	—	Admiral of France
1642	1661	Bernard de Nogaret de La Valette d'Épernon (1592-1661)	Son	
1661	1662	Louis de Goth d'Épernon (1584-1662)	Cousin	
1662	1690	Jean Baptiste Gaston de Goth d'Épernon (1631-1690)	Son	
1690	1691	Louis Henri de Pardaillan de Gondrin (1640-1691)	Cousin	Marquis of Montespan
1691	1712	Louis de Pardaillan de Gondrin (1688-1712)	Grandson	Marquis of Gondrin
1712	1743	Louis de Pardaillan de Gondrin (1707-1743)	Son	Marquis of Gondrin, Duke of Antin
1743	1757	Louis de Pardaillan de Gondrin (1727-1757)	Son	Duke of Antin

Louis de Pardaillan de Gondrin (1707–1743) sold Épernon to Adrien Maurice de Noailles, Duke of Noailles, and the title of "Duke of Épernon" fell into disuse.
