= Louis de Pardaillan de Gondrin (1727–1757) =

French nobleman

Louis de Pardaillan de Gondrin (15 February 1727 – 1737 or 1757) was a French nobleman.

== Life ==
Born at Versailles, he was the only son of the Duke of Antin and through his father he was descended from the house of Pardaillan de Gondrin, an old noble family of Gascon origin. His paternal great-grandmother was Madame de Montespan. His paternal grandmothers remarriage to Louis-Alexandre de Bourbon (an illegitimate son of Louis XIV) would bring the family even closer to the French royals.

His mother Françoise Gillonne de Montmorency, daughter of the Duke of Piney-Luxemburg and a granddaughter of the maréchal de Luxembourg

He was baptized at the Chapel of Versailles on 25 July 1728 by Armand de Rohan. He was styled the Marquis of Gondrin.

He served as the governor of Orleanais and after the death of his paternal uncle governor of Alsace.

== Death ==
He died at the age of 25 of smallpox at Kloster Zeven while serving as marechal de camp in the French army stationed in Bremen, Germany during the French army's invasion of Hannover during the Seven Years' War.

He was buried on the 14th of September in the churchyard at Kloster Zeven.

As he died unmarried and without children he was the final Duke of Antin.

His three younger sister would then come to inherit the wealth and estates of Pardaillain de Gondrin.

== Ancestry ==
Ancestors of Louis de Pardaillan de Gondrin (1727–1757)

16. Louis Henri de Pardaillan de Gondrin, Marquis of Montespan
8. Louis Antoine de Pardaillan de Gondrin, Duke of Antin
17. Françoise-Athénaïs de Rochechouart de Mortemart, Marchioness of Montespan
4. Louis de Pardaillan de Gondrin, Marquis of Gondrin
18. Emmanuel de Crussol, Duke of Uzès
9. Julie Françoise de Crussol d'Uzès
19. Marie Julie de Sainte-Maure
2. Louis de Pardaillan de Gondrin, Duke of Antin
20. Anne de Noailles, Duke of Noailles
10. Anne Jules de Noailles, Duke of Noailles
21. Louise Boyer, Dame of Sainte-Geneviève des Bois
5. Marie Victoire de Noailles
22. Ambroise François de Bournonville, Duke of Bournonville
11. Marie Françoise de Bournonville
23. Lucrèce Françoise de La Vieuville
1. Louis de Pardaillan de Gondrin
24. François de Noailles, Count of Ayen
12. François Henri de Montmorency, Duke of Luxembourg, maréchal de Luxembourg
25. Rose de Roquelaure
6. Charles Frédéric de Montmorency, Duke of Luxembourg
13. Madeleine Charlotte de Clermont-Tonnerre
3. Françoise Gillonne de Montmorency
14. René Gillier, Marquis of Clérembault
7. Marie Gillonne Gillier de Clérembault
15. Marie Le Loup de Bellenave

French nobility
Preceded by Louis de Pardaillan de Gondrin	Duke of Antin; 1743–1757	Extinct
