= Louis de Pardaillan de Gondrin =

Louis de Pardaillan de Gondrin may refer to:

- Louis de Pardaillan de Gondrin (1688–1712), French nobleman
- Louis de Pardaillan de Gondrin (1707–1743), French courtier and freemason
- Louis de Pardaillan de Gondrin (1727–1757), French nobleman
