= Antin, Hautes-Pyrénées =

Antin
- Commune
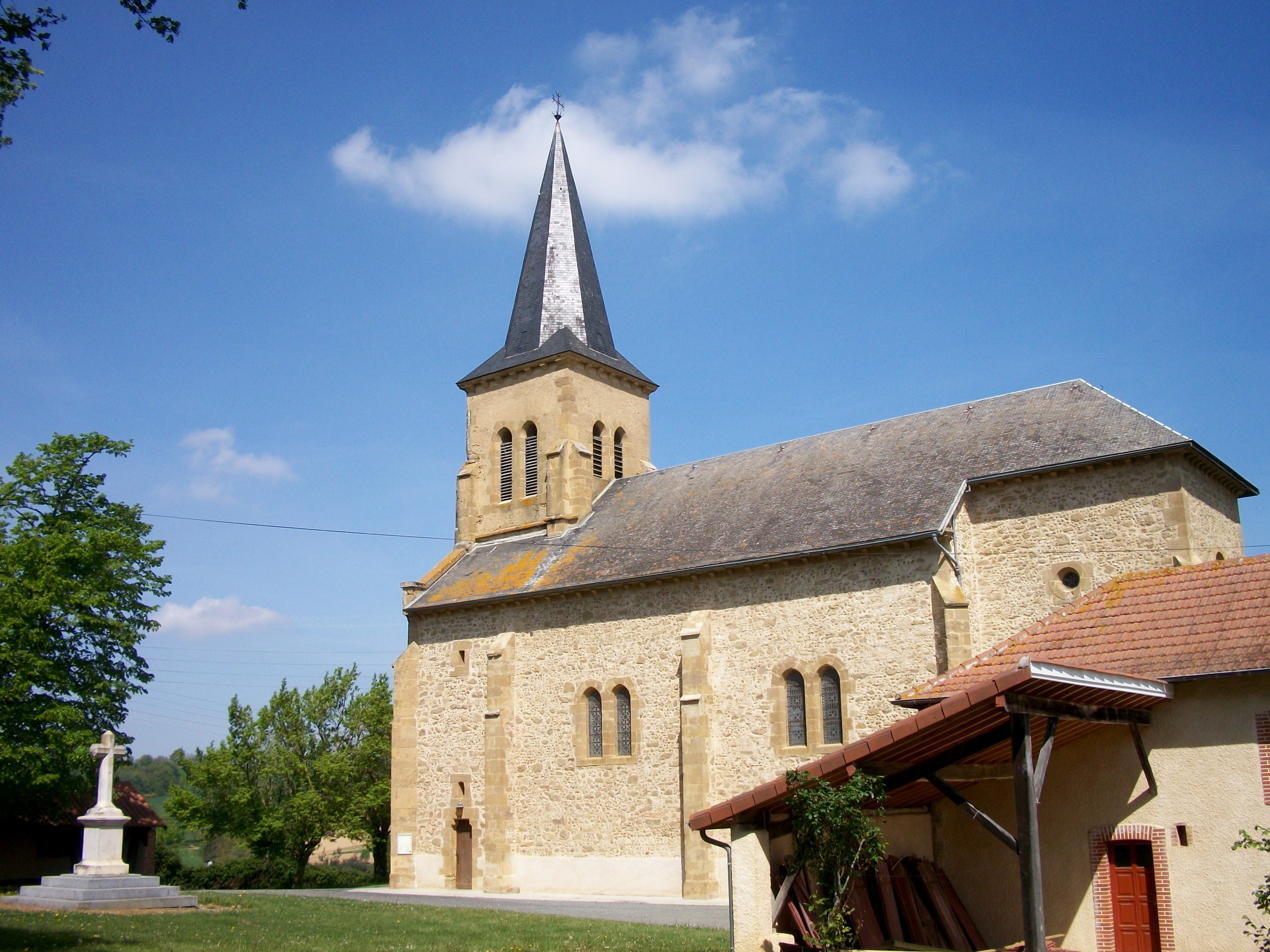
- The church of Antin

- Coat of arms
- Location of Antin
- Location within France Location within Occitanie
- Coordinates: 43°20′05″N 0°17′17″E
- Country: France
- Region: Occitania
- Department: Hautes-Pyrénées
- Arrondissement: Tarbes
- Canton: Les Coteaux

Government
  - Mayor (2020–2026): Jean Maumus
- Area^{1}: 7.46 km^{2} (2.88 sq mi)
- Elevation: 330 m (1,080 ft)
- Highest elevation: 404 m (1,325 ft)
- Lowest elevation: 246 m (807 ft)
- Population (2023): 92
  - Density: 12/km^{2} (32/sq mi)
- Time zone: UTC+01:00 (CET)
  - Summer (DST): UTC+02:00 (CEST)
- INSEE/Postal code: 65015 /65220
- ^{1} French Land Register data, which excludes lakes, ponds, glaciers > 1 km^{2} (0.386 sq mi or 247 acres) and river estuaries.

Antin (French pronunciation: [ɑ̃tɛ̃]) is a commune in the Hautes-Pyrénées department in southwestern France. It was once a duchy owned by the House of Pardaillan de Gondrin, the family which Madame de Montespan married into.

The former Barony then Marquisate, was elevated to a duchy by Louis XIV (former lover of Mme de Montespan) in 1711 for Louis Antoine de Pardaillan de Gondrin and was passed down his family till its extinction in 1757 at the death of Louis Antoine's great-grandson Louis de Pardaillan de Gondrin (1727–1757) who died in Breme during the Seven Years' War.

== Population ==
Historical population
Year	Pop.	±% p.a.
1968	179	—
1975	170	−0.73%
1982	150	−1.77%
1990	131	−1.68%
1999	136	+0.42%
2007	108	−2.84%
2012	128	+3.46%
2017	106	−3.70%
2023	92	−2.33%
Source: INSEE

== See also ==
- Communes of the Hautes-Pyrénées department
- Dukes of Antin
