= Bellegarde =

Bellegarde may refer to:

== People ==
- Bellegarde (surname)

== Places ==
=== Canada ===
- Bellegarde, Saskatchewan, a French-Canadian settlement in Saskatchewan

=== Communes in France ===
- Bellegarde, Gard
- Bellegarde, Gers
- Bellegarde, Loiret
- Bellegarde, Tarn
- Bellegarde-du-Razès, in the Aude département
- Bellegarde-en-Diois, in the Drôme département
- Bellegarde-en-Forez, in the Loire département
- Bellegarde-en-Marche, in the Creuse département
- Bellegarde-Poussieu, in the Isère département
- Bellegarde-Sainte-Marie, in the Haute-Garonne département
- Bellegarde-sur-Valserine, in the Ain département
  - Bellegarde station

== See also ==
- Château de Bellegarde (disambiguation)
- Fort de Bellegarde, in the Pyrénées-Orientales département in France
