= Louis de Pardaillan de Gondrin (1707–1743) =

French courtier

Louis
- Duke of Antin
- Full name: Louis de Pardaillan de Gondrin
- Born: 9 November 1707; Versailles, France
- Died: 9 December 1743 (aged 36); France
- Noble family: Pardaillan de Gondrin
- Spouse: Françoise Gillonne de Montmorency
- Issue Detail: Louis, Duke of Antin; Julie, Duchess of Uzès
- Father: Louis de Pardaillan de Gondrin
- Mother: Marie Victoire de Noailles

Louis de Pardaillan de Gondrin (French pronunciation: [lwi də paʁdajɑ̃ də ɡɔ̃dʁɛ̃]; 9 November 1707 – 9 December 1743), Duke of Antin (French: duc d'Antin), was a French courtier, freemason and male-line great-grandson of Madame de Montespan.

== Early life ==
He was born at Versailles in 1707, the elder of the two children of Louis de Pardaillan de Gondrin, marquis de Gondrin, and his wife, Marie Victoire de Noailles. His father was a member of the House of Pardaillan de Gondrin, an old noble family of Gascon origin. His mother was one of twenty children born to Anne Jules de Noailles and Marie Françoise de Bournonville. Among his large extended family were maternal cousins, Adrien Maurice, Duke of Noailles (who married Madame de Maintenon's heiress) and the Duke of La Vallière.

== Career ==
Louis was known as the marquis de Gondrin from 1712 when his father died.

Maria was his father's first wife. She remarried on 2 February 1723 to Louis Alexandre de Bourbon, Count of Toulouse, the youngest child of Louis XIV and Louis's great-grandmother : Mme de Montespan in a secret ceremony. The marriage was announced only after the death of the Régent in December of the same year. As such, his half-brother was Louis Jean Marie de Bourbon, the duc de Penthièvre and single richest man in France prior to the revolution. His nephews included the prince de Lamballe (husband of the murdered Maria Teresa Luisa of Savoy).

== Personal life ==
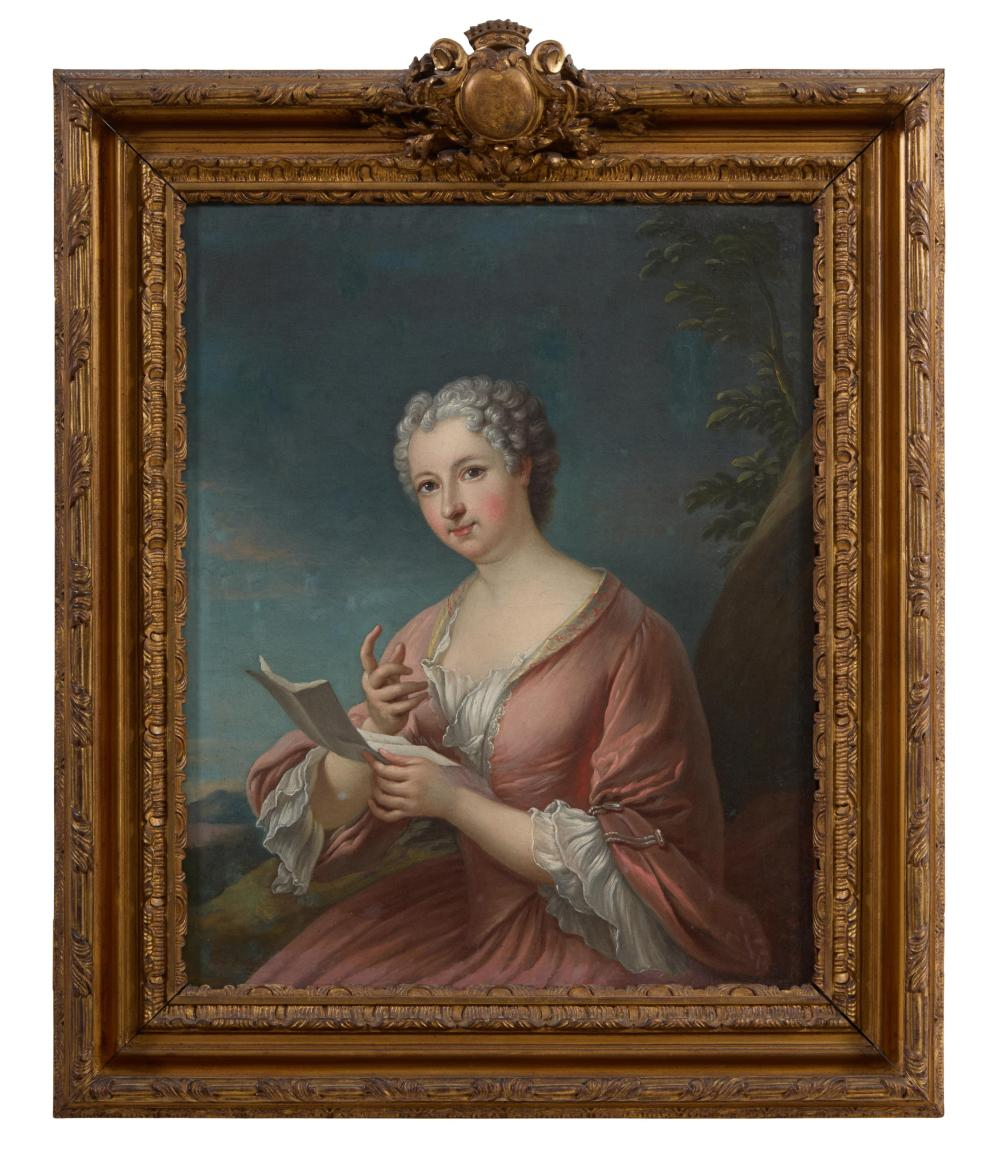
Francoise Gillonne de Montmorency, Duchess of Antin (1704-1768)

On 29 October 1722, he married Françoise Gillonne de Montmorency (1704–1768), a granddaughter of François Henri de Montmorency, Duke of Luxembourg and Marshal of France. The couple had four children, one son (born in 1727) and three daughters.

- Julie Sophie Gillette de Pardaillan de Gondrin (1725–1797), the Abbess of Fontevraud from 1765 to 1792; she never married.
- Louis de Pardaillan de Gondrin (1727–1757), who never married and died in Breme during the Seven Years' War.
- Marie Françoise de Pardaillan de Gondrin (1728–1764), who married François Emery de Durfort, Count of Civrac.
- Julie Magdeleine Victoire de Pardaillan de Gondrin (1731–1799), who married François Emmanuel de Crussol, 9th Duke of Uzès, one of the most senior peers in France, ranking immediately after the Princes of the Blood (legitimate male-line descendants of the ruling House of Bourbon).

He died at the age of 36, and was succeeded as Duke of Antin by his only son Louis. His wife outlived him by 25 years.

== Ancestry ==
Ancestors of Louis de Pardaillan de Gondrin (1707–1743)

16. Roger Hector de Pardaillan de Gondrin, Marquis of Antin
8. Louis Henri de Pardaillan de Gondrin, Marquis of Montespan
17. Marie-Christine Zamet
4. Louis Antoine de Pardaillan de Gondrin, Duke of Antin
18. Gabriel de Rochechouart de Mortemart, Duke of Mortemart
9. Françoise-Athénaïs de Rochechouart de Mortemart, Marchioness of Montespan
19. Diane de Grandseigne
2. Louis de Pardaillan de Gondrin, Marquis of Gondrin
20. François de Crussol, Duke of Uzès
10. Emmanuel de Crussol, Duke of Uzès
21. Marguerite d'Apchier
5. Julie Françoise de Crussol
22. Charles de Sainte-Maure, Duke of Montausier
11. Marie Julie de Sainte-Maure
23. Julie Lucine d'Angennes
1. Louis de Pardaillan de Gondrin
24. François de Noailles, Count of Ayen
12. Anne de Noailles, Duke of Noailles
25. Rose de Roquelaure
6. Anne Jules de Noailles, Duke of Noailles
26. Antoine Boyer, Lord of Sainte-Geneviève-aux-Bois
13. Louise Boyer
27. Françoise de Wignacourt
3. Marie Victoire Sophie de Noailles
28. Alexandre I, Duke of Bournonville
14. Ambroise-François, Duke of Bournonville
29. Anne de Melun
7. Marie-Françoise de Bournonville
30. Charles, Duke of La Vieuville
15. Lucrèce Françoise de La Vieuville
31. Marie Bouhier de Sainte-Geneviève, Lady of Beaumarchais

French nobility
Preceded by Louis Antoine de Pardaillan de Gondrin	Duke of Antin; 1722–1743	Succeeded by Louis de Pardaillan de Gondrin
