= Marie Christine de Pardaillan de Gondrin =

French noble

Marie Christine
- Full name: Marie Christine de Pardaillan de Gondrin
- Born: 17 November 1663
- Died: 1675 (aged 11–12)
- Noble family: Pardaillan de Gondrin
- Father: Louis Henri de Pardaillan de Gondrin
- Mother: Françoise de Rochechouart de Mortemart

Marie Christine de Pardaillan de Gondrin (17 November 1663 - 1675) was the eldest legitimate child of Françoise de Rochechouart de Mortemart and her husband, the Marquis of Montespan. She died about age 11 or 12.

== Biography ==
Marie Christine was born in Paris to Louis Henri de Pardaillan de Gondrin, marquis de Montespan and his wife of nine months Françoise de Rochechouart de Mortemart. She was the older of two children born to the couple and had numerous half brothers and sisters as a result of her mother's affair with Louis XIV of France.

When her father found out about the affair between the King and her mother, Montespan decided to take his children away to his country estate before raising a scandal at court, challenging the king one day at Saint-Germain-en-Laye and decorated his carriage with antlers (like horns, these were traditional symbols of the cuckolded husband).

He was promptly imprisoned in the For-l'Évêque, then exiled to his lands - taking young Marie Christine and the even younger Louis Antoine.

This did not stop his agitation, and he not only came to Paris nearly every year between 1670 and 1686 but also commanded an annual requiem mass to be sung for his wife during her lifetime.

Twelve-year-old Marie Christine died at the Château de Bonnefont, one of her father's castles in Gascony.

== Ancestry ==
Ancestors of Marie Christine de Pardaillan de Gondrin

16. Hector de Pardaillan de Gondrin, Baron of Montespan
8. Antoine Arnaud de Pardaillan de Gondrin, Marquis of Antin
17. Jeanne d'Antin, Dame of Antin
4. Roger Hector de Pardaillan de Gondrin, Marquis of Antin
18. Jean de Saint-Lary, Baron of Termes
9. Paule de Saint-Lary
19. Anne de Villemur
2. Louis Henri de Pardaillan de Gondrin, Marquis of Monstespan
20. Sébastien Zamet
10. Jean Zamet, Baron of Murat
21. Madeleine Le Clerc du Tremblay
5. Marie Christine de Zamet de Murat
22. Jacques de Goth, Marquis of Rouillac
11. Jeanne de Goth, Dame of Rouillac
23. Hélène de Nogaret
1. Marie Christine de Pardaillan de Gondrin
24. René de Rochechouart, Seigneur de Mortemart
12. Gaspard de Rochechouart, Marquis of Mortemart
25. Jeanne de Saulx de Tavannes
6. Gabriel de Rochechouart, 1st Duke of Mortemart
26. Charles, Count of Maure
13. Louise de Maure, Countess of Maure
27. Diane de Pérusse des Cars, Princess of Carency
3. Françoise-Athénaïs, Marchioness of Montespan
28. Pierre de Grandsaigne, Seigneur de La Flotte
14. Jean de Grandseigne, Marquis of Marsillac
29. Françoise Baillard
7. Diane de Grandseigne
30. François de La Béraudière, Seigneur of Villechèze
15. Catherine de La Béraudière, Lady of Villenon
31. Anne Adrienne Frotier
