= Château de Petit-Bourg =

French castle

Coordinates: 48°38′22″N 2°26′28″E

The Château de Petit-Bourg is located in Évry-sur-Seine (Essonne).

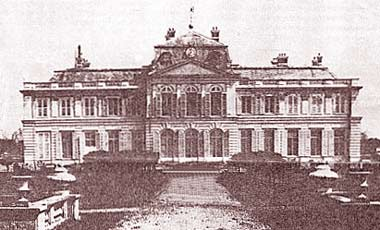
The Château de Petit-Bourg as designed by Jean-Michel Chevotet.

The first château known on the site of Petit-Bourg, on the Seine, overlooking the Forêt de Sénart, began in the 17th century for André Courtin, Canon of Notre-Dame de Paris and was completed about 1635 for Jean Galland. Around 1650, Monseigneur Louis Barber de La Rivière, Bishop of Langres, had gardens designed by François Mansart. Jules Hardouin-Mansart worked there around 1662.

Near 1695, Françoise-Athénaïs, marquise de Montespan acquired the Château de Petit-Bourg. There she realized important alteration work and charged André Le Nôtre with designing the gardens à la françaises, and staged in terraces. She took refuge there after her disgrace.

With her death in 1707, her son Louis Antoine de Pardaillan de Gondrin, duke of Antin, inherited the château and remade the gardens. Between 1716 and 1722, he undertook to entirely rebuild with the architect Pierre Cailleteau dit Lassurance. The new Château de Petit-Bourg was a truly princely residence, the masterpiece of Lassurance. The best decorators of the time had worked there. One particularly noticed the cabinet in the gallery of the appartement du roi (angle du pavillon du midi, à l'étage) and the grand salon, decorated by Louis-Claude Vassé with royal portraits and ducal emblems.

Before the reconstruction of the château, the duke of Antin received Louis XIV and, in 1717, the Tsar Peter the Great in Petit-Bourg. After the reconstruction, Louis XV and the queen Maria Leszczyńska stayed there frequently. Madame de Pompadour saw it while living in Étiolles - before being raised by the royal favour, and dreamed of this splendid residence.

After the death of the duke of Antin, the château remained empty for several years. When acquired by Marie Jacomel in 1750, the widow of Louis Chauvelin, président à mortier at the Parlement of Paris, it was entirely demolished and replaced by a new château built in 1756 in the neoclassical style by the architect Jean-Michel Chevotet.

At the time of the Revolution, the château was the property of the duchess of Bourbon, Bathilde d'Orléans. After having passed through several hands, it was acquired in 1827 by the banker Alexandre Aguado, marquis de Las Marismas, who accommodated his friend there, the type-setter Gioacchino Rossini and was elected mayor of Évry-on-Seine in 1831. The creation of the railroad from Paris to Corbeil unfortunately divided the park in two and separated it from the Seine. Alexandre Aguado sold the property on 7 April 1840 to speculators who undertook to divide the property.

The Germans occupied the château during World War II, and set fire to it in 1944, at their departure of Évry. The ruins were razed. At the site of the château was constructed the residence of the "Parc de Petit-Bourg". The aisle bordered with chestnut trees and limes along the residence houses was the allée d'honneur of the château.

== Bibliography ==
- Michel Gallet, Les architectes parisiens du XVIIIe siècle, Paris, Éditions Mengès, 1995, p. 284 – ISBN 2-85620-370-1
- Bruno Pons, « Le château du duc d'Antin, surintendant des Bâtiments du roi, à Petit-Bourg », Bulletin de la société de l'histoire de l'art français, 1987
