= Jean-Baptiste Chaussard =

French architect (1729–1818)

Jean-Baptiste Chaussard (4 September 1729, Tonnerre – 26 June 1818, Paris) was a French architect to the king, associated with Pierre Contant d'Ivry and Jean-Michel Chevotet. He was also related to Chevotet, nephew to the royal painter Jean Valade and father of the revolutionary Pierre-Jean-Baptiste Chaussard.
