= Bellegarde (surname) =

Bellegarde

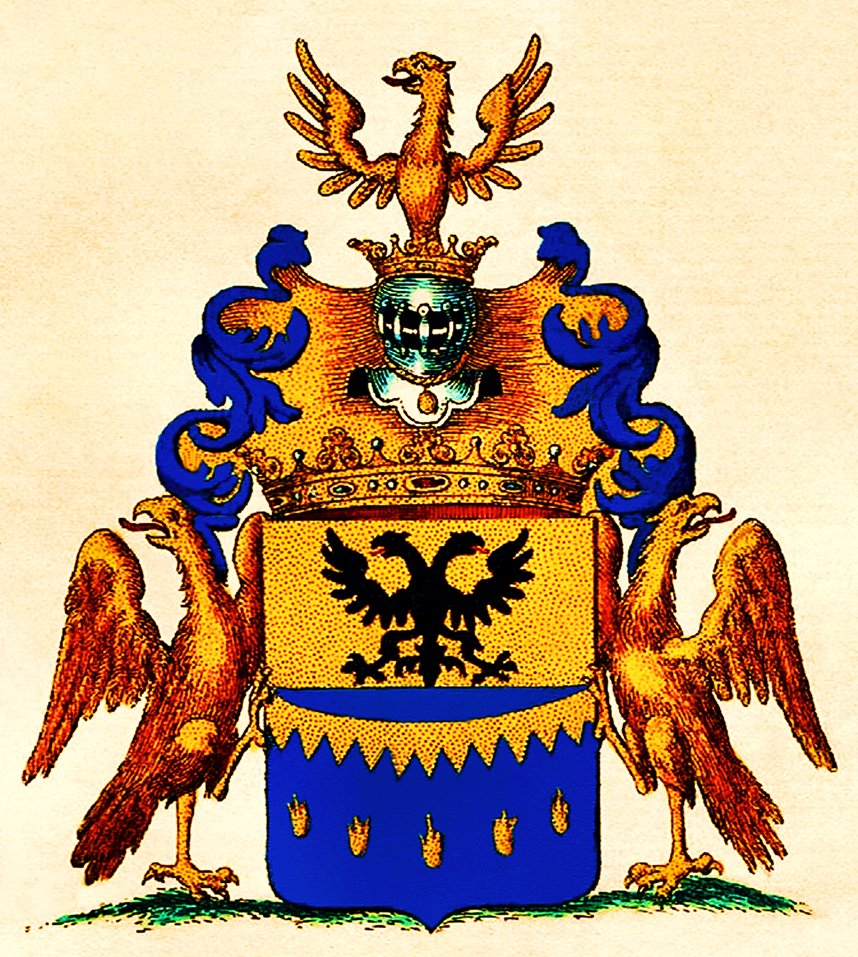
Coat of arms of the Counts von Bellegarde

The Bellegarde family is an Austrian noble family from Savoy, of French origin, whose members held the title of Count in Bohemia, granted to them on 13 September 1741.

It also a French surname derived from a toponym meaning "beautiful watch-tower or look-out".

== Notable people ==
- Adèle de Bellegarde (1772–1830), French salonnière and society figure
- Dantès Bellegarde (1877–1966), Haitian historian and diplomat
- Count Heinrich von Bellegarde (1756–1845), Austrian General of the French Revolutionary Wars
- Jean-Ricner Bellegarde (born 1998), French footballer
- Perry Bellegarde (born 1962), national chief of the Canadian Assembly of First Nations
- Roger de Saint-Lary de Bellegarde (died 1579)
- Roger de Saint-Lary de Termes (1562–1646), duc de Bellegarde (Note: The Encyclopædia Britannica Eleventh Edition relates that in 1645 the title of this duchy was transferred to the estate of Choisy-aux-Loges in Gâtinais, and was borne later by the family of Pardaillan de Gondrin, heirs to the house of Saint-Lary-Bellegarde. When Seurre passed into the possession of the Princes of Condé they in the same way acquired the title of dukes of Bellegarde.)
- Sophie Lalive de Bellegarde, French writer

== See also ==
- Bellegarde (disambiguation)
