= Louis Antoine de Pardaillan de Gondrin =

French nobleman

Louis Antoine de Pardaillan
- Duke of Antin
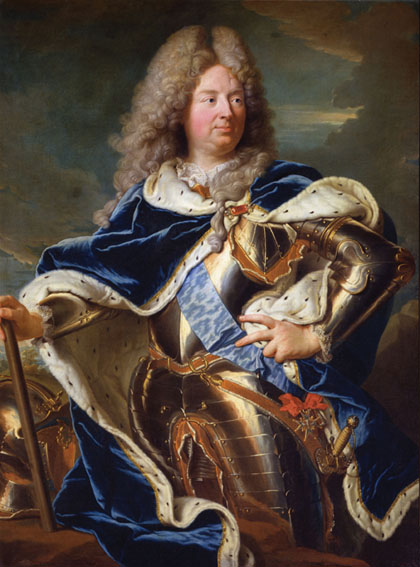
- Louis Antoine, c.1710 (Studio of Rigaud Versailles)
- Full name: Louis Antoine de Pardaillan
- Born: 5 September 1665
- Died: 2 November 1736 (aged 71)
- Noble family: House of Pardaillan
- Spouse: Julie Françoise de Crussol
- Issue Detail: Louis, Marquis of Gondrin; Pierre, Bishop-Duke of Langres
- Father: Louis Henri de Pardaillan
- Mother: Françoise de Rochechouart

Louis Antoine de Pardaillan (5 September 1665 – 2 November 1736) was a French nobleman, marquis of Antin, Gondrin and Montespan, and first Duke of Antin. He was Superintendent, director-general of the Bâtiments du Roi between 1708 and 1736.

== Biography ==
The legitimate son of Louis Henri de Pardaillan, marquis of Montespan, and Madame de Montespan, he was carefully raised by his father at the Château de Bonnefont in Gascony with his older sister Marie Christine. He came to court in 1683 and then set out on a military career, with his father gaining him a commission as lieutenant.

Thanks to his 1686 marriage, he was able to enter the circle of the Grand Dauphin. His wife, Julie Françoise de Crussol, was a grand daughter of Charles de Sainte Maure, Duke of Montausier and a great-granddaughter of the famous marquise de Rambouillet.

He was also an ally of his half-brothers the Duke of Maine and the Count of Toulouse, legitimised bastard children of Madame de Montespan and Louis XIV. However, despite his best efforts, he was unable to win the king's favour and, after he made an error in maneuvering his troops at the battle of Ramillies, he was even dismissed from the army in 1707.

Yet, later in 1707, Madame de Montespan's death brought her son Louis Antoine the bequest of Château de Petit-Bourg at Évry-sur-Seine and, more importantly, royal favour when he was finally rewarded by being made governor of the Orléanais (1707) then head of the Bâtiments du Roi (1708). In the latter role he gained particular access to the king.

In 1711, Louis XIV promoted the marquisate of Antin into a "duché-pairie", and in 1724 d'Antin became a knight of the Ordre du Saint-Esprit.

An excellent organiser with a natural aptitude for command, he knew how to please and how to smooth out difficulties, enriching himself greatly from the Law system. As head of the Bâtiments de Roi, the duke of Antin supervised works on Versailles. A confidant to Louis XIV and his architectural projects (such as the Salon d'Hercule), he managed to complete them under Louis XV.

Antin opened new marble mines in southern France, such as that at Beyrède, which supplied a marble that was named "brèche d'Antin" after him, which was the preferred marble of Louis XIV and used for several of Versailles' fireplaces, such as the monumental one in the Salon d'Hercule.

In 1692 he bought the château de Bellegarde at Bellegarde, which he rebuilt at the start of the 18th century. He also rebuilt the gardens at château de Petit-Bourg before 1715, then around 1720 commissioned a new château from Pierre Cailleteau (known as "Lassurance"), whose construction was completed after the duke's death by Jacques V Gabriel. His Paris hôtel was in what is now the Chaussée-d'Antin, giving that area its current name. Under the Régence the duke of Antin came into political responsibilities. With the Polysynody he became president of the Council of Matters (Conseil du dedans).

After the suspension of the councils he remained on the Regency Council, in a purely honorific position which he left on 22 February 1722 at the same time as the other dukes and marshals. From 1722 onwards he retired more and more, that year renouncing his title of duke in favour of his grandson, and died in 1736 at his Paris Mansion in the Chaussée-d'Antin. His Paris mansion was later the hôtel de Richelieu, Paris seat of the Duke of Richelieu.

== Issue ==
On 21 August 1686 he married Julie Françoise de Crussol, daughter of Emmanuel de Crussol, 5th Duke of Uzès and Marie Julie de Crussol, granddaughter of the Duke of Montausier. They had two children;

1. Louis de Pardaillan (1689–1712), Marquis of Gondrin, whose wife was Marie Victoire de Noailles had issue.
2. Pierre de Pardaillan (1692–1733), bishop-duke of Langres and member of the Académie française, never married.

== Works ==
- Mémoires, published by Just de Noailles, duc de Mouchy, Paris, Société des bibliophiles français, 1821
- Discours de ma vie et de mes pensées, 1822
- Le duc d'Antin et Louis XIV : rapports sur l'administration des bâtiments, annotés par le Roi, published with a preface by Jules Guiffrey, Paris, Académie des bibliophiles, 1869

== Ancestry ==
Ancestors of Louis Antoine de Pardaillan de Gondrin

16. Hector de Pardaillan, Baron of Montespan
8. Antoine Arnaud de Pardaillan, Marquis of Antin
17. Jeanne d'Antin, Dame of Antin
4. Roger Hector de Pardaillan de Gondrin, Marquis of Antin
18. Jean de Saint Lary, Seigneur of Thermes
9. Paule de Saint Lary
19. Anne de Villemur
2. Louis Henri de Pardaillan, Marquis of Monstespan
20. –
10. Baron Jean Zamet
21. –
5. Marie Christine de Zamet de Murat
22. Jacques de Goth
11. Jeanne de Goth, Dame of Rouillac
23. Hélène de Nogaret
1. Louis Antoine de Pardaillan de Gondrin
24. René de Rochechouart, Seigneur de Mortemart
12. Gaspard de Rochechouart, Marquis of Mortemart
25. Jeanne de Saulx de Tavannes
6. Gabriel de Rochechouart, Duke of Mortemart
26. Charles, Count of Maure
13. Louise de Maure, Countess of Maure
27. Diane de Pérusse des Cars, Princess of Carency
3. Françoise de Rochechouart, Madame de Montespan
28. Pierre de Grandsaigne, Seigneur of La Flotte
14. Jean de Grandseigne, Marquis of Marsillac
29. Françoise Baillard
7. Diane de Grandseigne
30. François de La Béraudière, Seigneur of Villechèze
15. Catherine de La Béraudière, Lady of Villenon
31. Anne Adrienne Frotier

French nobility
| Preceded by Louis Henri de Pardaillan | Marquis of Antin; 1691–1711 | Succeeded by Promoted to Duke of Antin |
| Preceded by New creation | Duke of Antin; 1711–1722 | Succeeded by Louis de Pardaillan |
Political offices
| Preceded by Jules Hardouin Mansart | Director of the Bâtiments du Roi; 1708–1736 | Succeeded by Philibert Orry |
