= Jean Valade =

French painter (1710–1787)

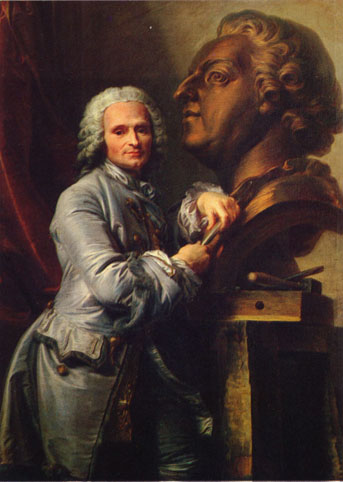
Jean Valade, Portrait of Jean-Baptiste II Lemoyne, 1750. Musée du château de Versailles

Jean Valade (baptized 27 November 1710 – 12 December 1787) was a French painter and pastel artist of the Rococo movement, specializing in portraiture.

== Early life ==
He was born in Poitiers and baptized on 27 November 1710. Valade was the son of Léonard who was also a painter and Marie Bellot. He trained with his father before moving to Paris in 1739. He married Gabrielle Louise Remond, 20 November 1752, and has no descendants. His great nephew was Pierre-Jean-Baptiste Chaussard.

== School ==
In 1750, he was admitted to the Royal Society of Arts and was appointed academician, September 29, 1754. He became a student of Charles-Antoine Coypel, official Painter to the King and theorist, a member of the French School. Valade was later appointed painter to the king. He participated in numerous exhibitions between 1751 and 1781. Denis Diderot published several negative reviews of her portraits. In 1769, he denounced Valade at the Salon, because in his view "[he] is not a poor painter, but a very poor painter, because you can not do two jobs at once."

== Work ==
Jean Valade was very popular as a portraitist, and also as a specialist in pastel, which earned him a large clientele of nobles and bourgeois. During the 1760s, he produced both oil pastel at the portrait of Mr. and Mrs. Faventines Fontenille playing music as well as those of Peter and Elizabeth Faventines, the portrait of Joseph Balthasar Gibert, and one of Mr. Carré de Cande. Two museums on permanent display several works Valade: the Musée des Beaux-Arts d'Orléans and the Musée Rupert-de-Chièvres. Other portraits can be found in Saint-Quentin, Aisne, The Louvre, the Palace of Versailles, and the Château de Maisons.

== Death ==
Jean Valade died on 12 December 1787 in his apartment in the cloister of St. Honoré. He was buried the next day in the vault of the chapel of the Virgin in the church of Saint-Honoré, in the presence of the architect Jean-Baptiste Chaussard and Jean-Baptiste Adam, the husband of his nieces.

== Sources ==
- Klingsöhr-Leroy, Cathrin (2003). "Valade, Jean". Grove Art Online.
- Klinka-Ballesteros, The Pastels, Friends of Museums of Orleans, 2005.
- Trope Marie-Helene Jean Valade, museum Sainte-Croix de Poitiers, 1993
