= Pierre de Pardaillan de Gondrin =

Duke-Bishop of Langres

- Duke-Bishop of Langres
- Born: 1692; Versailles, France
- Died: 4 November 1733 (aged 40–41); Bougey, France
- Noble family: House of Pardaillan de Gondrin
- Father: Louis Antoine de Pardaillan de Gondrin
- Mother: Julie Françoise de Crussol

Pierre de Pardaillan de Gondrin (1692 – 4 November 1733) was the Duke-Bishop of Langres, France.

Gondrin was born in Versailles, the son of Louis Antoine de Pardaillan de Gondrin, duc d'Antin, and grandson of Madame de Montespan. He was a doctor of theology and canon of Paris and of Strasbourg. He became Duke-bishop of Langres and Peer of France in 1724. He was elected an honorary member of the Académie des Inscriptions et Belles-Lettres in 1720 and, without having ever written a single work, a member of the Académie Française in 1725. He died in Bougey.
