= Château de Bellegarde =

Château de Bellegarde may refer to:

- Château de Bellegarde (Lamonzie-Montastruc) in Dordogne
- Château de Bellegarde (Loiret) in Loiret

See also:

- Château Bellegarde in Landes
