= Portrait of Anne-Jules de Noailles =

Painting by Hyacinthe Rigaud

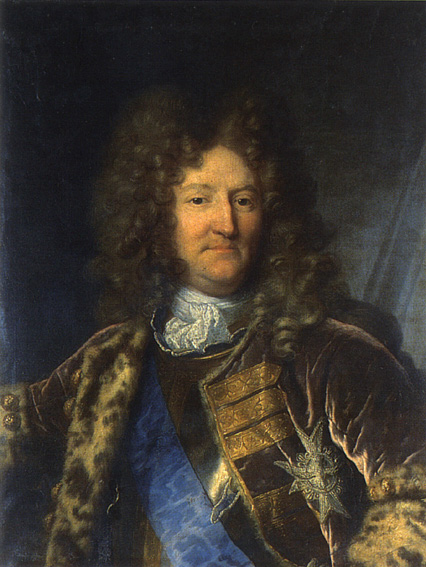
- Artist: Hyacinthe Rigaud
- Year: 1691
- Medium: oil on canvas
- Dimensions: 82 cm × 64 cm (32 in × 25 in)
- Location: Museum of Grenoble, Grenoble

Portrait of Anne-Jules de Noailles is an oil on canvas painting by Hyacinthe Rigaud, from 1691. It depicts Anne Jules de Noailles, 2nd Duke of Noailles, now in the Museum of Grenoble.

== History and description ==
It seems to be the best version of the main painting of the subject, commissioned in 1691 for 188 livres, a half-length portrait painted by Rigaud in tribute to his military successes in Catalonia. It shows him in his blue sash of the Order of the Holy Spirit (presented on 31 December 1688) and with the chest decoration of a Commander of that order. A battlefield tent appears in the background.

Rigaud's birthplace of Perpignan meant that he frequently met de Noailles. In 1703 he, Jean-Baptiste Colbert and Jules Hardouin-Mansart were the witnesses to the planned marriage between Rigaud and a young woman from Châtillon : Rigaud's 1716 biography states that when the painter was added to the nobility of Roussillon de Noailles (then governor general of the province) "honoured him by writing to congratulate him on his new title".

A second portrait of de Noailles was painted by Rigaud in 1693 to mark his promotion to marshal of France, valued at 122 livres and 10 sol and also a half-length. In 1694, when de Noailles became viceroy of Catalonia, Rigaud had his assistants make three replicas, one by Verly and one by Le Roy. In 1702, two large copies of the portrait were made, either by Rigaud himself or with the finishing touches by him - the first was valued at 250 livres and the second at 100 livres. These probably extended the half-length into a full-length standing portrait and one of them may now be in the Army Museum, in Paris. ·

In a letter from the marquise de Sévigné to her daughter Françoise-Marguerite de Sévigné, dated 10 June 1695, it was stated that de Noailles "was coming back [to sit again] to complete his portrait at Rigaud's house".

== Bibliography (in French) ==
- Mémoires inédits sur la vie et les ouvrages des membres de l'Académie royale de peinture et de sculpture, publiés d'après les manuscrits conservés à l'école impériale des beaux-arts. Vol. II. Paris: Société de l'histoire de l'art français. 1854.
- Claire Consans (1995). Musée National du château de Versailles : Les peintures. Vol. II. Paris: Réunion des musées nationaux.
- Antoine Joseph Dezallier d'Argenville (1745). Abrégé de la vie des plus fameux peintres, avec leurs portraits gravés en taille-douce, les indications de leurs principaux ouvrages, Quelques réflexions sur leurs Caractères, et la manière de connoître les dessins des grands maîtres. Vol. IV. Paris: De Bure.
- Anatole de Montaiglon (1875–1892). Procès-verbaux de l'Académie Royale de Peinture et de Sculpture (1648-1793) publiés par Anatole de Montaiglon d'après les registres originaux conservés à l'École des Beaux-Arts de Paris. Paris: Société de l’Histoire de l’art français.
- Stéphan Perreau (2004). Hyacinthe Rigaud (1659-1743), le peintre des rois. Montpellier: Nouvelles Presses du Languedoc.
- Roger de Portalis (baron) and Henri Beraldi (1880–1882). Les Graveurs du dix-huitième siècle. Paris: D. Morgand et C. Fatout.
- Roman, Joseph (1919). Le livre de raison du peintre Hyacinthe Rigaud. Paris: Laurens.
