= Pierre-Jean-Baptiste Chaussard =

French poet and politician (1766–1823)

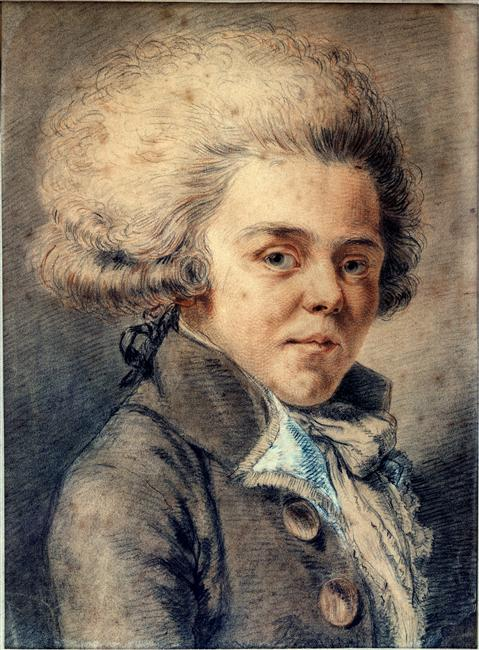
Portrait of Antoine de Rivarol. Before the Revolution, Chaussard printed an Ode on the devotion of the duke of Brunswick, and figured in Rivarol's Petit Almanach.

Pierre-Jean-Baptiste Chaussard (29 January 1766, Paris – 30 September 1823), known as Publicola Chaussard, was a French writer, art critic, poet, revolutionary, politician and follower of Theophilanthropy. According to Michaud in his Biographie universelle, Chaussard was "a writer who would perhaps have failed to make a lasting reputation if he had lived under other circumstances".

In 1809 he was elected a correspondent, living abroad, of the Royal Institute of the Netherlands.

== Family ==
Pierre Chaussard was the son of the architect Jean-Baptiste Chaussard (1729–1818) and of Anne Michelle Chevotet, daughter of the royal architect Jean-Michel Chevotet. He was also the great nephew of Jean Valade, peintre du roi, and close cousin to Agathe de Rambaud and Benoît Mottet de La Fontaine. Pierre-Jean-Baptiste was thus raised amidst a family moving in noble circles, close to major aristocrats who were witnesses at his marriage. His father's architecture, however, went out of fashion and he did not work at all after 1789, with most of his clients emigrating or being guillotined.
