= Jean Cailleteau =

French architect

Jean Cailleteau (French: [ʒɑ̃ kajto]; 1690–1755), known as "Lassurance" (or as "Lassurance le jeune" to distinguish him from his architect father Pierre Cailleteau), was a French architect. He was admitted to the Académie royale d'architecture in 1723 and became controller of the château de Marly.
