= Pierre Cailleteau =

French architect

Pierre Cailleteau (French: [pjɛʁ kajto]; 1655–1724), called Lassurance, was a French architect. He is not to be confused with his son Jean Cailleteau, also known as Lassurance, or Lassurance le Jeune to distinguish him from his father.

== Biography ==
He was noticed by Jules Hardouin-Mansartin 1679 on the work-site of the Château de Clagny. In 1684, he started as a designer in the administration of the Bâtiments du Roi and played a major role in the new decoration of the royal residences. On the testimony of Saint-Simon, Hardouin-Mansart "was ignorant in his trade, and of Robert De Cotte his brother-in-law, it was hardly less. They both took an artist that they held close and secret to themselves, that was Lassurance, without which they could do nothing."

Lassurance is attributed to most of the decorative sketches commissioned for the Château de Versailles and the Trianon de Marbre around 1690: the King's apartments in the left wing of Trianon (round parlor, chapel parlor) and the apartments of the Duchess of Burgundy (oval parlor of the castle, mirror office, small gallery...). He allowed the panelling to continue to the ceiling, which he decorated with Rinceaux, Acanthus leaves and images of playing children. He introduced arcades in basket handle falling again on consoles, mirror panelling and fireplace surroundings to support height.

In 1699, Lassurance studied at the Royal Academy of Architecture. He left the Versailles architect office for the supervision of the Hôtel des Invalides. He then worked for important Parisian clientele, aristocrats and financiers, gaining recognition from François Duret, president of the Grand Conseil, with whom one finds him often associated.

Lassurance's Parisian hôtels reveal a sense of new comfort: from then on, the parade of apartments continue to develop, clearing antechambers and servant corridors and creating comfortable and independent apartments throughout the floors, more suitable for daily living.

On the other hand, the front elevations were criticized. Lassurance followed the rules of the central avant-corps, placing generally Ionic columns to the ground floor and attic pillars to the first floor. But some judged the height of this as too low, and caused confusion between the placement of the central window and the pediment sculpture.

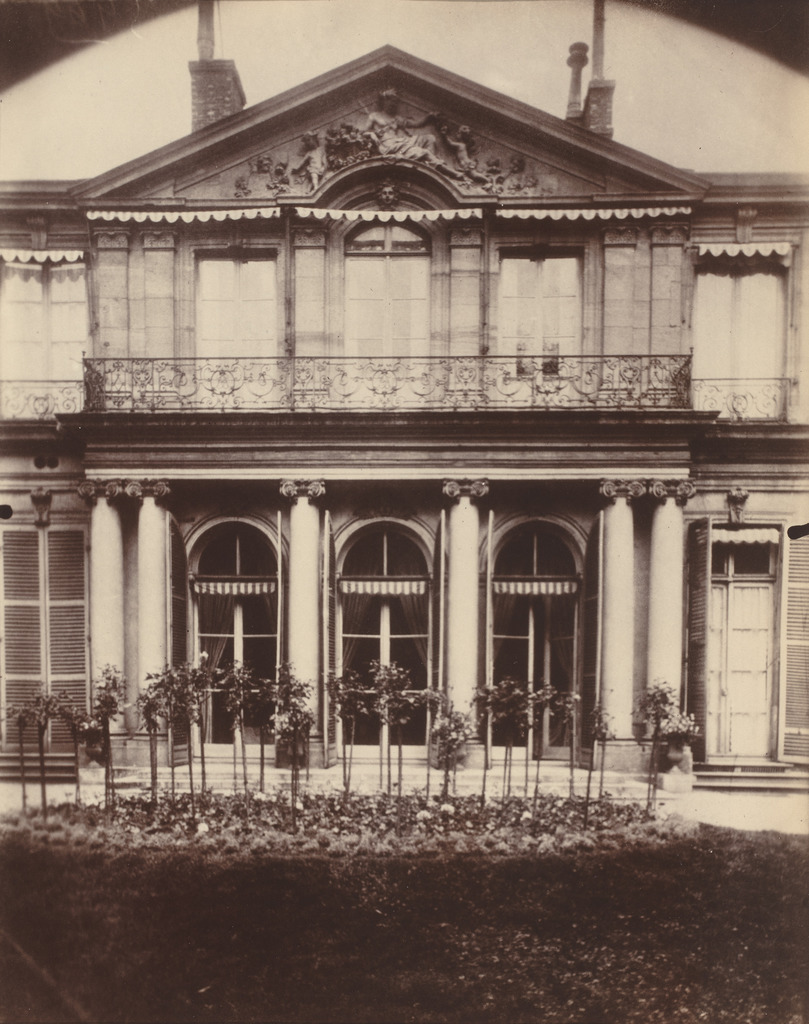
The Hôtel de Rothelin-Charolais

The German lecturer Brice vigorously criticized the Rivié Hotel: "Which achieves to disfigure all, it has a big opening in the middle, in a displeasing manner, without any proportion of its height with its width. The side facing the courtyard is almost built in the same manner". But an avid other, Édouard Fournier, is of an opinion all opposed one: "The gigantic door of the hotel Desmarets, one of the masterpieces by the better student of Mansart, Lassurance, serves today entry to the passage of the Panoramas, opposite the small street of Montmorency."

The masterpiece of Lassurance was no doubt Château de Petit-Bourg, constructed for the Duke of Antin between 1716 and 1722.

== Bibliography ==
- Gallet, Michel (1995). Les Architectes Parisiens du XVIIIe siècle : Dictionnaire biographique et critique, "Pierre Cailleteau dit Lassurance", pp. 281–284. Paris: Mengès. ISBN 978-2-85620-370-5.
- Neuman, Robert (1996). "Lassurance family [Cailleteau]. (1) Pierre Lassurance I", vol. 18, pp. 815–816, in The Dictionary of Art, 34 volumes, edited by Jane Turner, reprinted with minor corrections in 1998. London: Macmillan. ISBN 978-1-884446-00-9.
