= Palais Berlitz =

Coordinates: 48°52′13.63″N 2°20′3.96″E

The Palais Berlitz, also known as Palais de Hanovre, is an office building built in Paris in the 1930s on a block formed by the Boulevard des Italiens, the Rue Louis-le-Grand, the Rue de la Michodière and the rue du Hanovre.

It was built to replace the Pavillon de Hanovre, which was dismantled and rebuilt in a park in a Paris suburb.

== Pavillon de Hanovre ==
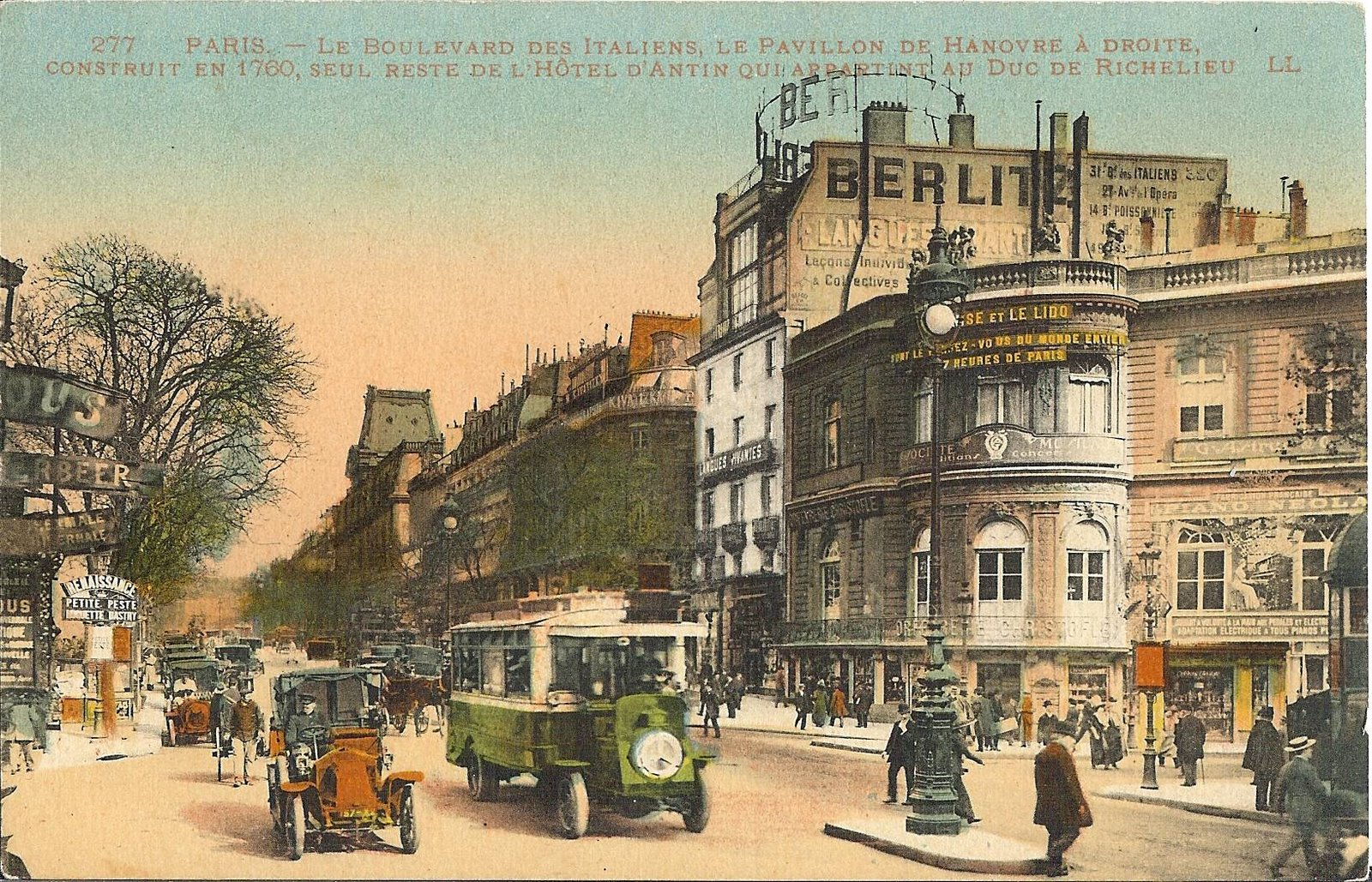
Pavillon de Hanovre on the boulevard des Italiens

The Pavillon de Hanovre was built between 1758 and 1760 by the French architect Jean-Michel Chevotet (1698–1772) at the request of the Duke of Richelieu on the rue Neuve-Saint-Augustin (now the Boulevard des Italiens).

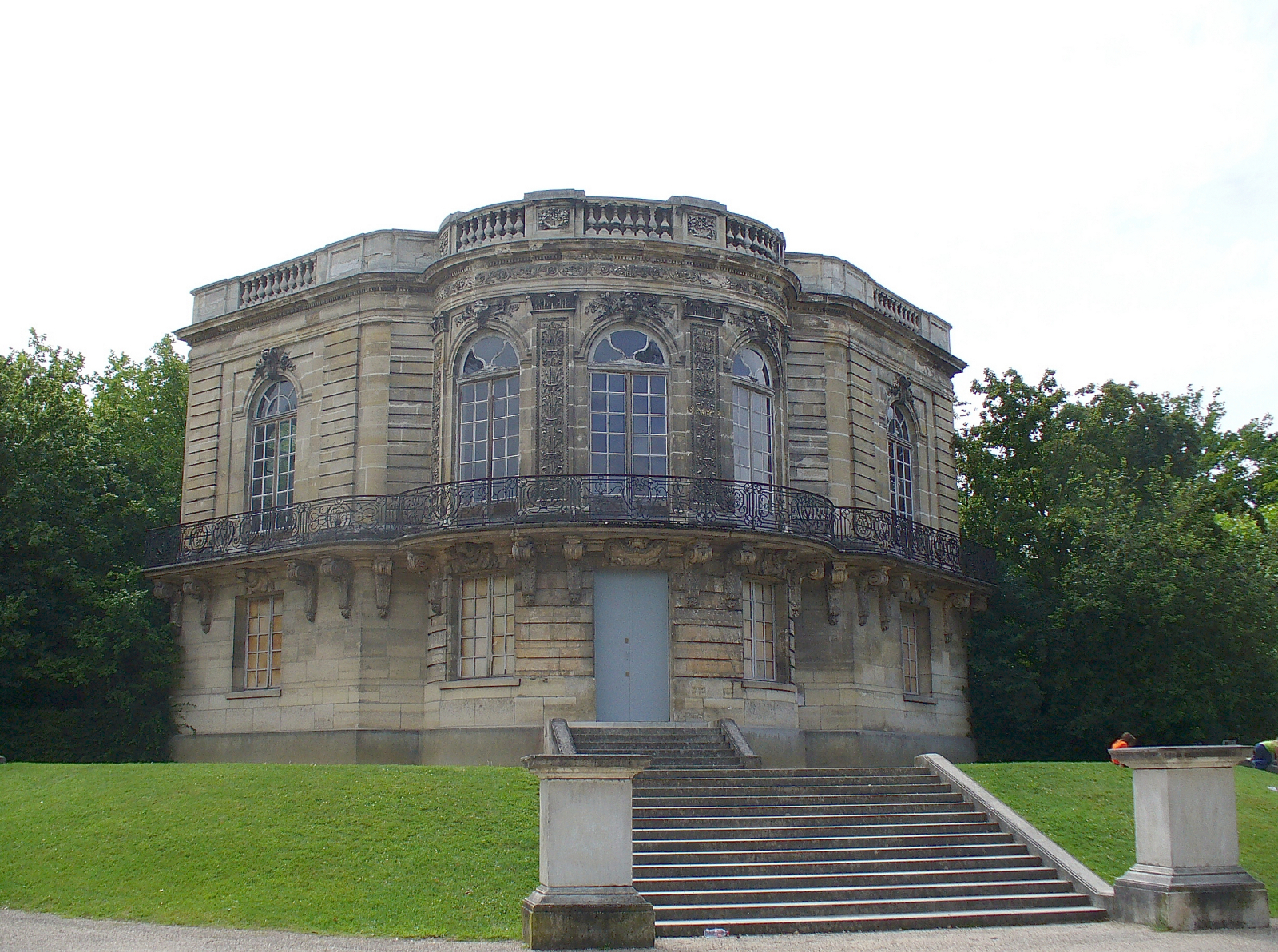
The Pavillon de Hanovre, rebuilt in the Parc de Sceaux

During construction of the Palais Berlitz, the Pavilion de Hanovre was disassembled and reconstructed in 1932 in the gardens in Sceaux. This work was performed under the direction of the architect Léon Azéma, assisted by Louis Plousey and Urbain Cassan.

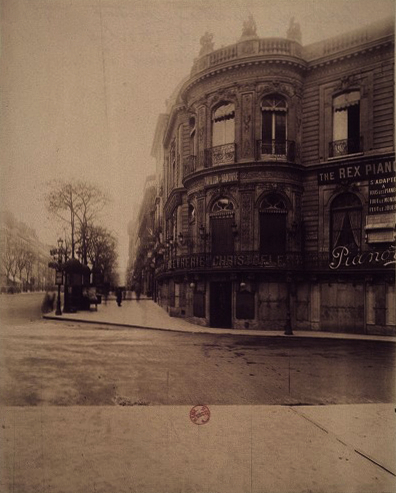
33 boulevard des Italiens, c. 1907-1908

== Palais Berlitz ==
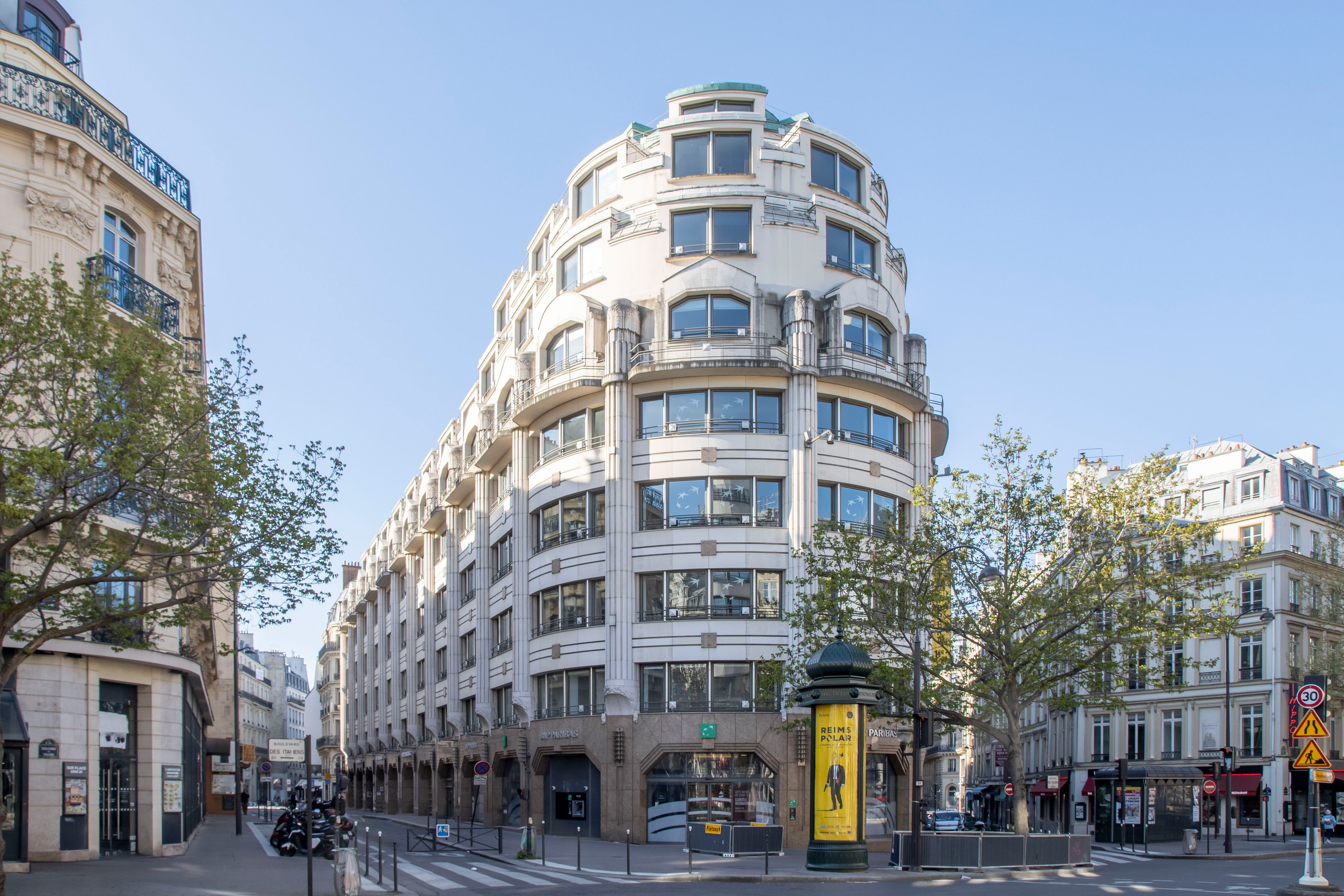
33 boulevard des Italiens, Present

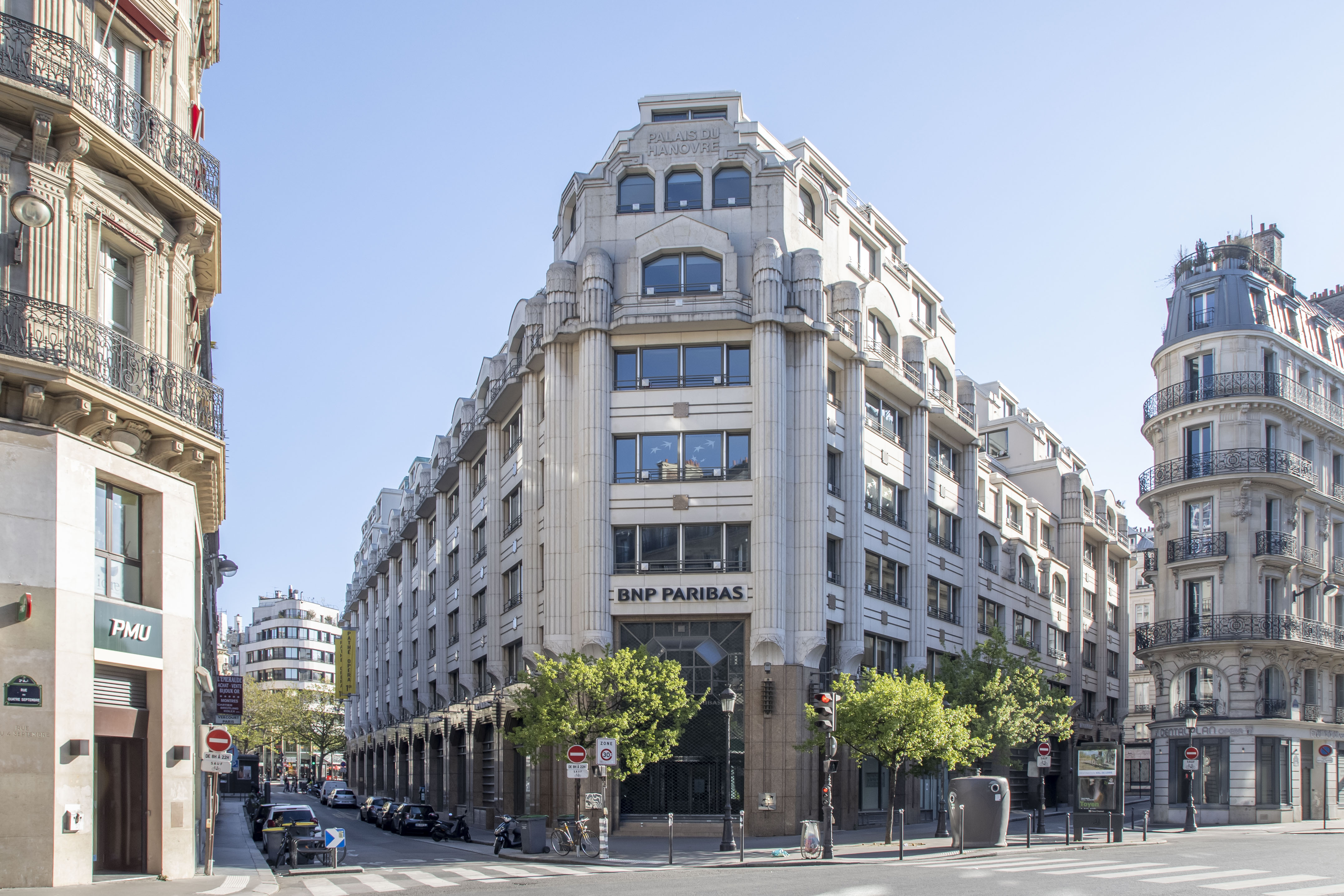
Idem

Under the name of the Palace of Hanover, it was erected as an office building in the 1930s by architect Charles Lemaresquier (1870–1972), who conceived other buildings in the same style, such as the headquarters of Félix Potin, in partnership with Victor Laloux.

On the ground floor were stores and a newsreel theatre that seated 200.

The building was renamed the Palais Berlitz after the English language school located in the building. In the 1950s the ground floor and basement of the building were converted into a 1,500-seat cinema called the Berlitz, and the old newsreel theatre was turned into a restaurant.

It was one of the most important first-run movie theatres in Paris at that time. The design featured a huge curved lobby with stained glass windows leading to the big auditorium which had club armchairs. However, due to two large columns in the auditorium space, the size of the screen was limited.

In the 1980s Gaumont took over and divided the Berlitz including the restaurant (the former newsreel house) into six small screens. The place lost its original design.

In the 1990s the building was entirely rebuilt with only the facade remaining. In the new building, the new six-screen multiplex run by Gaumont has a new design and a total seating capacity of 1,137.

After a fire at the Credit Lyonnais headquarters, the French bank LCL installed its main branch in the building. In 2006, it was acquired by BNP Paribas to house offices of its Communications and Corporate and Investment Banking divisions.

== Le Juif et la France ==
Palais Berlitz is notorious for an antisemitic exhibition during Nazi occupation: Le Juif et la France (The Jew and France), which ran from 5 September 1941 to 15 January 1942.
