= Pardaillan =

Coordinates: 44°39′N 0°17′E

Pardaillan (French pronunciation: [paʁdajɑ̃]), the name of an old French family of Armagnac, of which several members distinguished themselves in the service of the kings of France in the 16th and 17th centuries.

Antoine Arnaud de Pardaillan, maréchal de camp, served Henry IV in Franche-Comté, Picardy and Savoy, and was created marquis de Montespan in 1612 and marquis d'Antin in 1615 under Louis XIII.
His grandson Louis Henri Pardaillan, marquis de Montespan, was the husband of Madame de Montespan, the mistress of Louis XIV.

Louis Antoine de Pardaillan de Gondrin (1665–1736), legitimate son of the famous marquise, became lieutenant-general of the armies of the king in 1702, governor of the Orléanais, director-general of buildings, in 1708, lieutenant-general in Alsace, member of the council of regency, and minister of state. He was created duc d'Antin in 1711.
The last duc d'Antin, Louis, died in 1757.

The Knight of Pardaillan is also a fictional character in the cloak and dagger novels Les Pardaillan by Michel Zévaco. A series which captured the attention of a young Jean-Paul Sartre, who describes his imagination as being suspended in his autobiography The Words between the famous tragedian Corneille and the knight-errant Pardaillan.

Albert Camus mentions the same series 'Pardaillan' in the unfinished autobiographical novel 'Le premier homme' (in the chapters named 'Lycee' and 'Jeudis et vacances').
