= Battle of Torroella =

1694 battle of the Nine Years' War

Coordinates: 42.0439°N 3.1286°E

- Part of the Nine Years' War
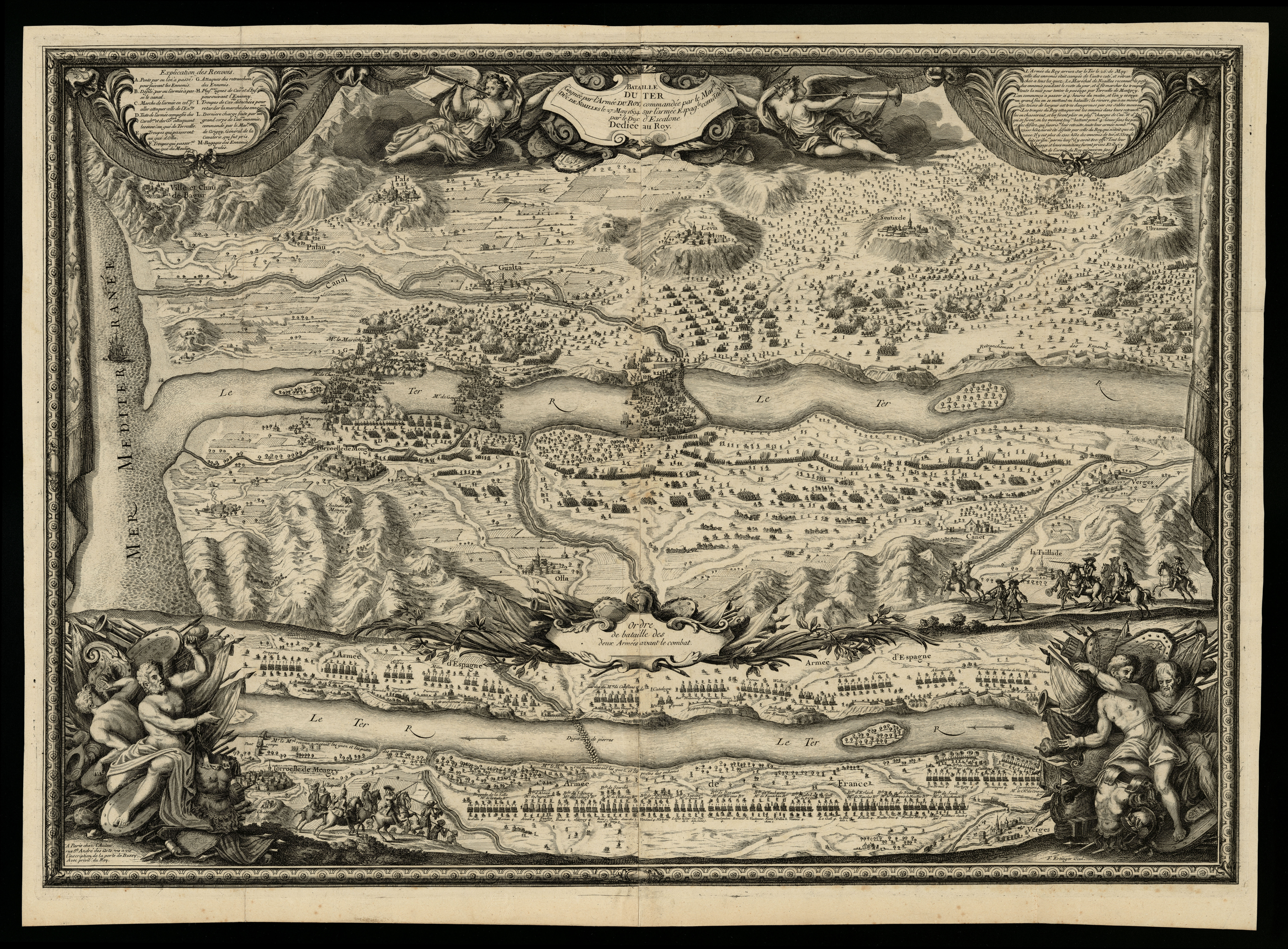
Date	27 May 1694
Location	near Girona, Catalonia, Spain
Result	French victory

Belligerents
France	Spain

Commanders and leaders
(Kingdom of France) Duc de Noailles	(Spanish Empire) Marquis of Villena-Escalona

Strength
26,000	20,000

Casualties and losses
1,300 casualties	5,700 casualties

The Battle of Torroella, also known as Battle of the river Ter, took place during the Nine Years' War, on 27 May 1694 along the banks and fords of the Ter River near the Puente Mayor in the vicinity of the important town of Girona, Catalonia, Spain.

== Prelude ==
In the year 1694 the French king decided to make an effort in Catalonia, and put Catinat's army in Piedmont on the defensive, reserving more troops to the Spanish front. The viceroy of Catalonia, don Juan Manuel Lopez Pacheco Acuña Giron y Portocarrero, marquis of Villena duke of Escalona, who was also the Captain General of the army, had deployed along the banks of the river Ter practically all the marching troops he could muster to oppose the strong French expeditionary corps, led by the French Marshal duke of Noailles, who wanted to capture Girona.

The two armies were approximately of the same force (20,000-foot and 4–5,000 horse). The French regiments were composed mostly of veteran troops, while the Spanish forces had a very large number of recruits and newly constituted units never tested on the field. Furthermore, the French army was superior in the number of artillery pieces and firepower, served by good trained officers and crews.

== Battle ==
The Spanish army was divided into three corps for guarding the fords at Verges, Ullà and Torroella. According to the Spanish viceroy "all our army was constituted by 11,900-foot and 4,000 horse which all included make the number of 16,300".

The previous days the enemies attempted with no success to force the fording at Verges, and then moved to Ullà and Torroella de Montgri. On 27 May a dense fog hung over the banks of the river; taking profit of this 2,000 French dragoons and cavalry, followed by a large number of infantry grenadiers, passed unaccounted the river at Torroella de Montgri, and charged portion of the Spanish infantry that were at the position and were not entrenched and had been battered by the French artillery from the other side of the river.

After the first discharge of their muskets the Spaniards could not oppose effectively the oncoming enemies, they started to flee from the battle camp putting into disorder the remaining of the army; many were killed while they could not effectively oppose the French : while the remaining of the cavalry withdrew leaving all the infantry without protection. At the notice of this defeat and because a large number of French troops had forded the river and were now positioned in order of battle, the whole Spanish army fell in confusion and the cavalry fled together with the rearguard until reaching Girona.

The French made a general advance against the Spaniards, with little opposition, killing many soldiers and capturing baggage and artillery pieces, beside a large number of standards.

== Aftermath ==
According to the official version the Spaniards lost 2,931-foot and 324 horse, among dead, wounded and deserters. According to French sources Spanish losses exceeded 9,000 men including 2,000 prisoners, while their own losses amounted to about 500 .

In this situation the viceroy had no other choice than sending some troops to Girona and marched with the largest part of his army towards Barcelona, where he remained the whole month of June. In the meanwhile the French sacked over 10 villages in the surroundings of the river Ter.

On 30 May, three days after the Spanish defeat at the river Ter, Noailles started the blocquade by land and sea of the fortress of Palamos, that surrendered to the French on 10 June. The city of Girona was taken on 29 June.

Barcelona was saved by the French minister of war who reduced the money to the Marshal of Noailles and immobilised his army. Another factor was the approach of an English fleet under Edward Russell which made the supporting French fleet under Tourville retreat to Toulon.
