= Jean-Baptiste Lemoyne =

Jean-Baptiste Lemoyne may refer to:

- Jean-Baptiste Lemoyne (sculptor)
- Jean-Baptiste Lemoyne (composer)
- Jean-Baptiste Lemoyne (politician)
- Jean-Baptiste Le Moyne de Bienville, French-Canadian colonial administrator in New France
