= Louis de Pardaillan de Gondrin (1688–1712) =

French nobleman

- Marquis of Gondrin
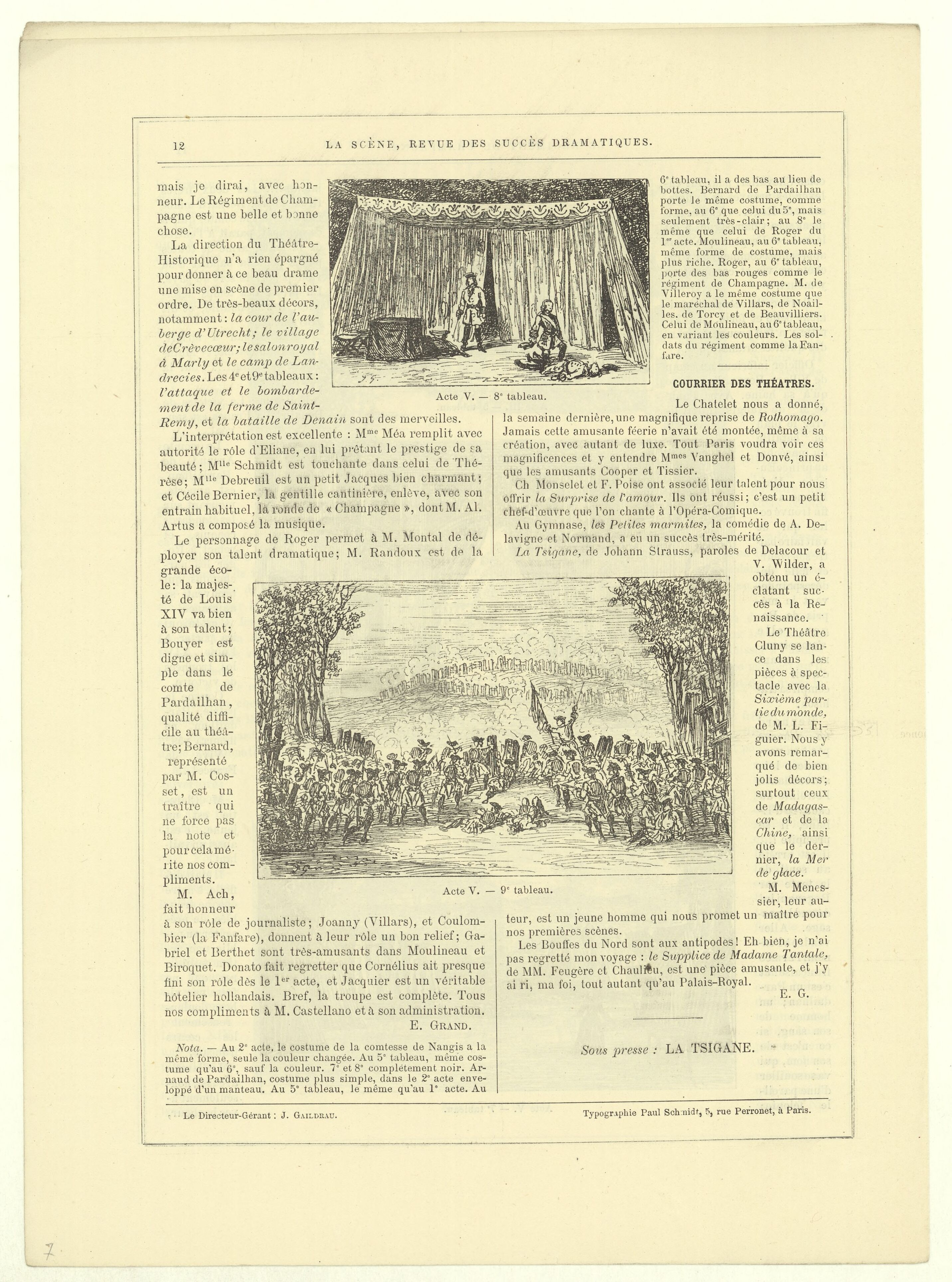
- Full name: Louis de Pardaillan de Gondrin
- Born: 3 July 1688; Château of Montespan, France
- Died: 22 February 1712 (aged 23); Versailles, France
- Noble family: Pardaillan de Gondrin
- Spouse: Marie Victoire de Noailles (m. 1707)
- Issue Detail: Louis, Duke of Antin; Antoine François, Marquis of Gondrin
- Father: Louis Antoine de Pardaillan de Gondrin, Duke of Antin
- Mother: Julie Françoise de Crussol

Louis de Pardaillan de Gondrin (3 July 1688 – 22 February 1712) was a French nobleman. He was a grandson of Madame de Montespan, former mistress of King Louis XIV. He was known as the marquis de Gondrin during his lifetime.

== Biography ==
Born at the Château of Montespan, he was the eldest of two sons born to Louis Antoine de Pardaillan de Gondrin and his wife Julie Françoise de Crussol (1669–1742), daughter of the Duke of Uzès. His younger brother Pierre was the Duke-Bishop of Langres. As the eldest, he was expected to succeed to be the head of the House of Pardaillan de Gondrin.

Known as the Marquis of Gondrin in his lifetime, he was outlived by his father and as such never succeeded to the Duchy of Antin which was created in 1711 by Louis XIV.

He married Marie Victoire de Noailles, one of the twenty children of the Duke of Noailles and Marie Françoise de Bournonville. The couple married on 25 January 1707.

At the time of her first marriage, Marie Victoire, marquise de Gondrin, was a dame du palais to the king's granddaughter-in-law, the duchesse de Bourgogne, future Dauphine of France and mother of King Louis XV.

Louis died in February 1712 at Versailles. He was succeeded by his son to the title Marquis of Gondrin. On 2 February 1723, Marie Victoire married again, in a secret ceremony, the Count of Toulouse, the legitimised younger son of Louis XIV and Madame de Montespan. The marriage was announced only after the death of the Régent in December of the same year.

== Issue ==
- Louis de Pardaillan de Gondrin (9 November 1707 – 9 December 1743), Duke of Antin, married Françoise Gillonne de Montmorency-Luxembourg and had issue;
- Antoine François de Pardaillan de Gondrin (1709–1741), Marquis of Gondrin, never married.
