= Jean-Michel Chevotet =

French architect (1698–1772)

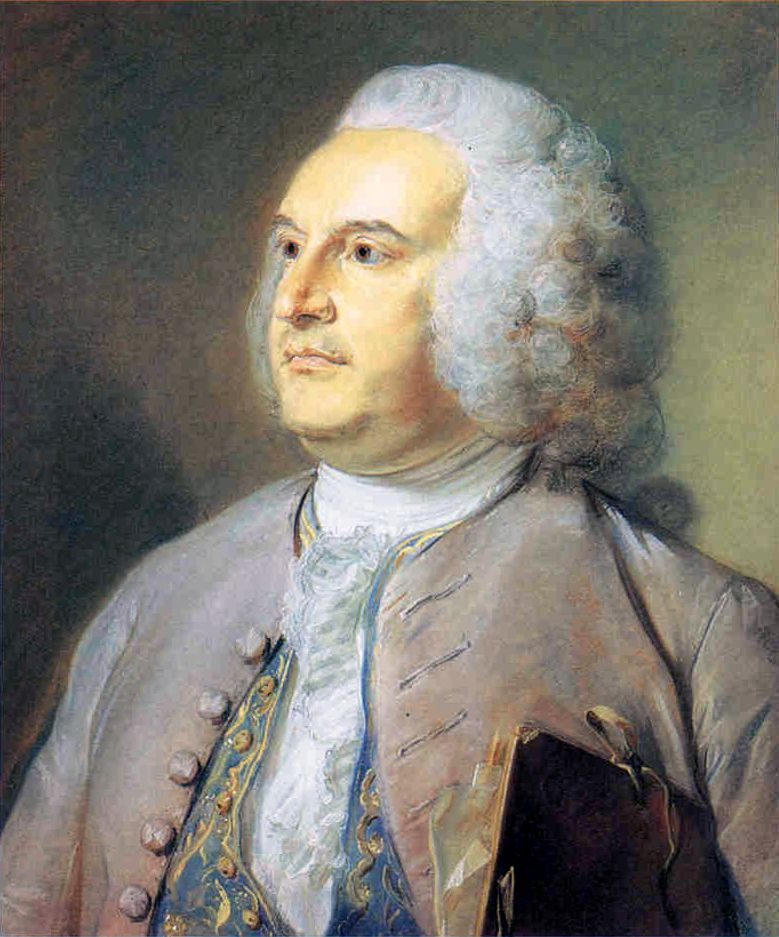
- Born: 11 July 1698
- Died: 4 December 1772 (aged 74)
- Occupation: Architect
- Awards: Prix de Rome (1722)
- Buildings: Château de Petit-Bourg

Jean-Michel Chevotet (11 July 1698, Paris – 4 December 1772) was a French architect. He and Pierre Contant d'Ivry were among the most eminent Parisian architects of the day and designed in both the restrained French Rococo manner, known as the "Louis XV style" and in the "Goût grec" (literally "Greek taste") phase of early Neoclassicism. His grandson was Pierre-Jean-Baptiste Chaussard.

== Life ==
In 1722, Chevotet won the Académie royale d'architecture's very first Prix de Rome with a study of a triumphal arch. A skilled draughtsman, he illustrated several architectural treatises, such as Jean-Baptiste de Monicart's "Versailles immortalisé" (1720–1725) and Jean Mariette's "L’Architecture française" (1727). On the death of Germain Boffrand in 1754, he became a member of the first rank of the Academie.

He and d'Ivray were tutors to Claude Nicolas Ledoux, whom they introduced to Classical architecture, in particular the temples of Paestum.

In 1748 and 1753, he unsuccessfully submitted 4 projects for the future Place Louis XV (now Place de la Concorde), and in 1764 was not commissioned for the extension of the Palais Bourbon.

== Works ==
=== Hôtels ===
He was more successful in establishing his reputation through his aristocratic clientele and adapted many existing Parisian hôtels to the modern taste, notably working on:

- hôtel Molé (also called hôtel de Roquelaure) (1741–1742), rue Saint-Dominique (today 246 boulevard Saint-Germain)
- hôtel de Béthune-Sully (also called hôtel de Lesdiguières) (1756–1757), rue Saint-Dominique (today 248 boulevard Saint-Germain)
- Hôtel Perrinet de Jars, 33 rue du Faubourg-Saint-Honoré
- the Pavillon de Hanovre for Louis François Armand du Plessis, duc de Richelieu, Marshal of France, commemorating his victories in Hanover, on rue Neuve-Saint-Augustin (deconstructed for the construction of the Palais Berlitz on the boulevard des Italiens, and rebuilt in 1932 in the park of the Château de Sceaux)

=== Country houses and gardens ===
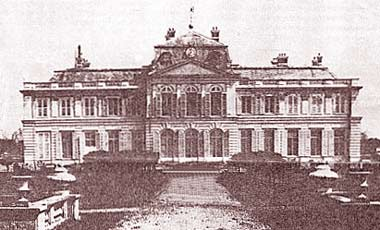
Chevotet's Château de Petit-Bourg

He also built country houses around Paris, notably:

- the house and gardens of château de Champlâtreux (1751–1757) for Mathieu-François Molé, president of the Great Council, also designing the gardens
- the house of Château d'Arnouville at Arnouville-lès-Gonesse (1751–57), for Jean-Baptiste de Machault d'Arnouville, president of the Great Council, collaborating with d'Ivry
- the neo-classical house and gardens of Château de Petit-Bourg at Évry (1756) for Germain Louis Chauvelin, president of the Great Council, destroyed 1944
- the gardens at Belœil (1754 and 1760) for princes Claude Lamoral de Ligne and Charles-Joseph de Ligne
- the gardens at Orsay (1758–1764) for Pierre Gaspard Marie Grimod d'Orsay.

He may also have worked on the modernisation of the Château of Thoiry (Yvelines).

== Bibliography ==
- Baritou, Jean-Louis, Chevotet, Contant, Chaussard, Paris, Délégation à l'Action Artistique de la Ville de Paris, La Manufacture, 1987, ISBN 2-904638-98-9
