= Château de Bellegarde (Loiret) =

Château in Centre-Val de Loire, France

Coordinates: 47°59′13″N 2°26′30″E

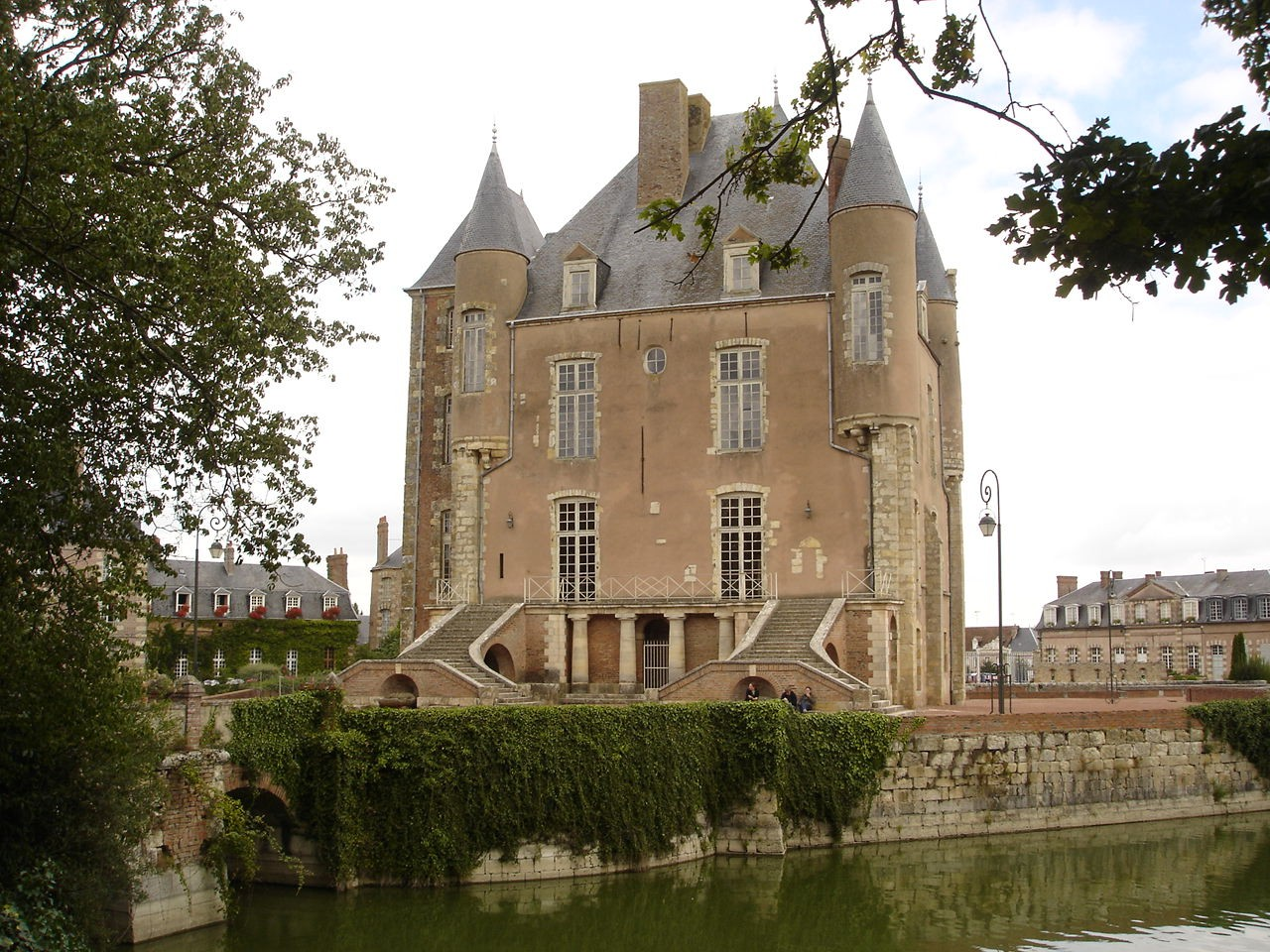
Château de Bellegarde

The Château de Bellegarde, also known as the Château des l'Hospital, is a château in the commune of Bellegarde, Loiret, Centre-Val de Loire, France. The alternative name is from the de l'Hospital family, owners in the 16th and 17th centuries. The structure dates originally from the 14th century, although there are traces of 12th-century work, but has been repeatedly remodelled by successive owners.

Large parts of the château have been listed as monuments historiques, in 1928, 1937 and 1969.

== Gallery ==
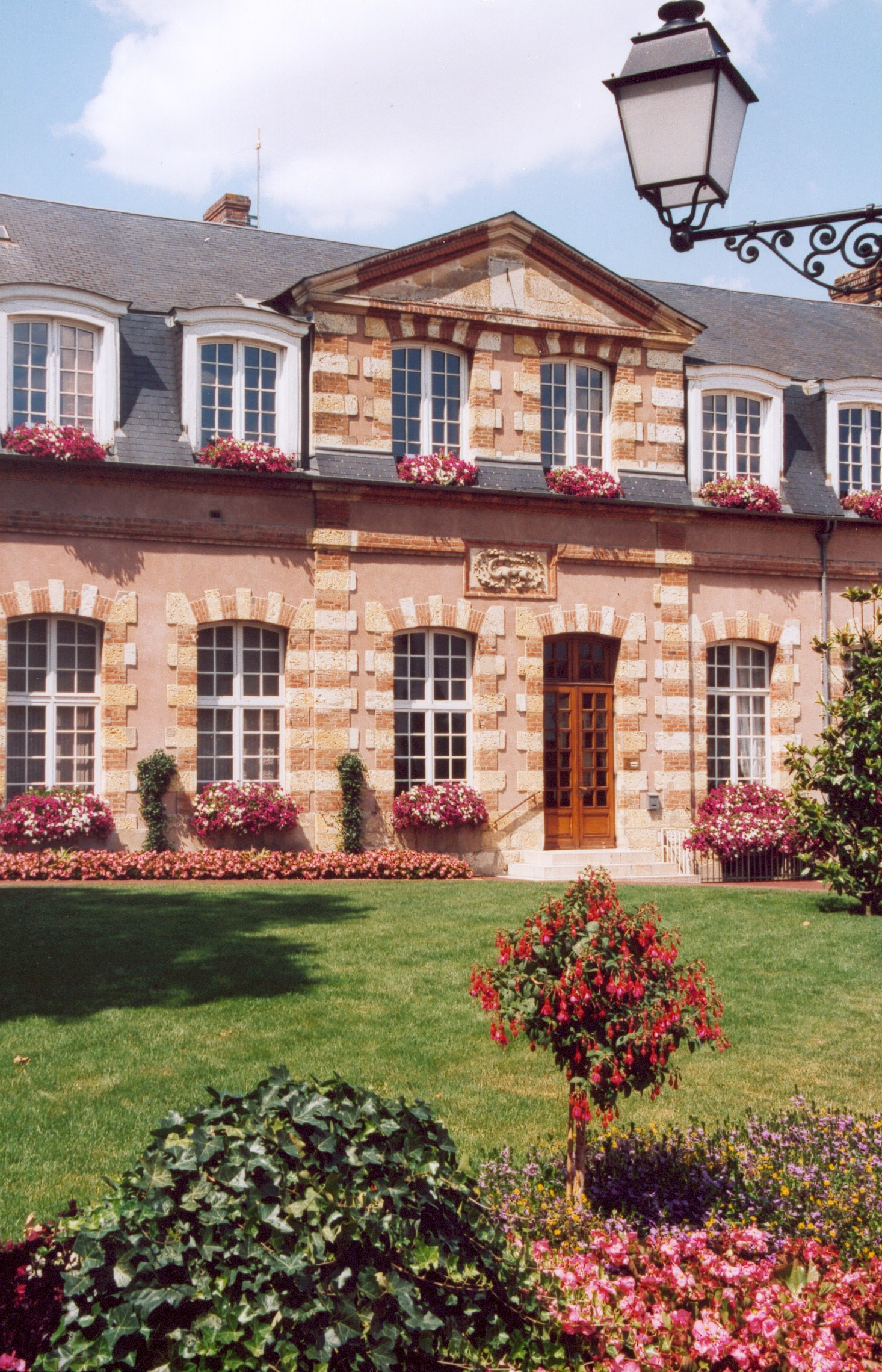

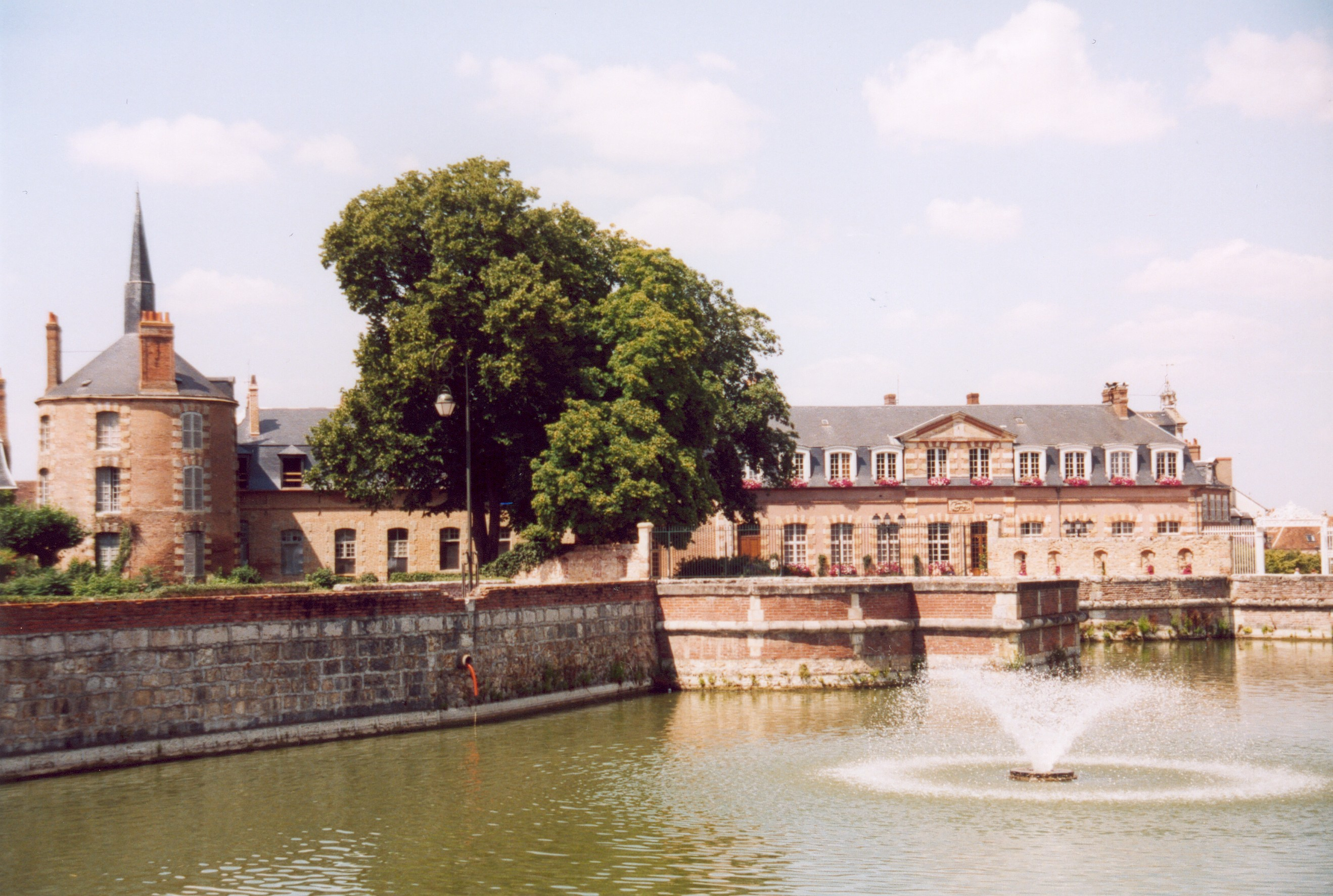

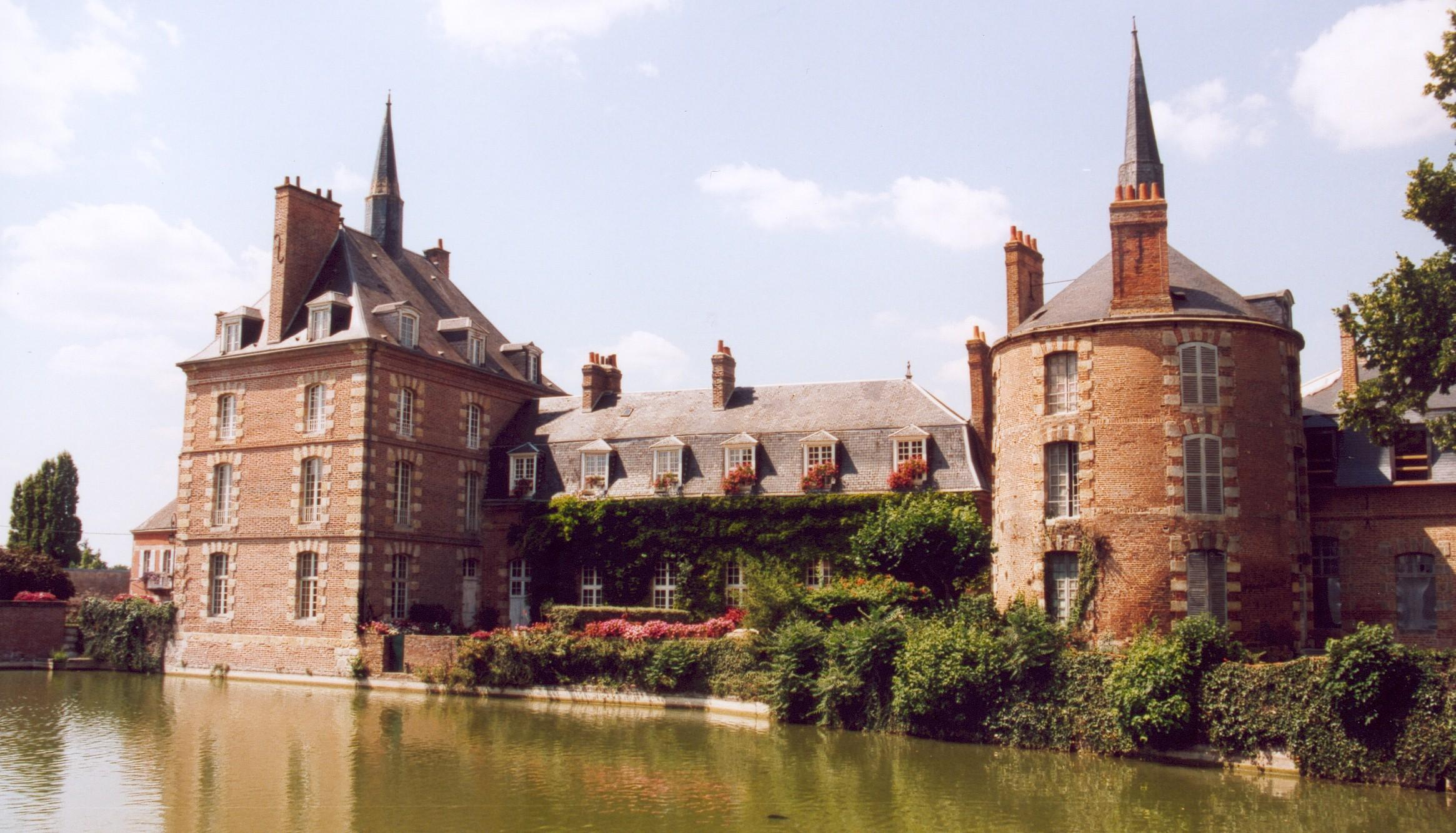

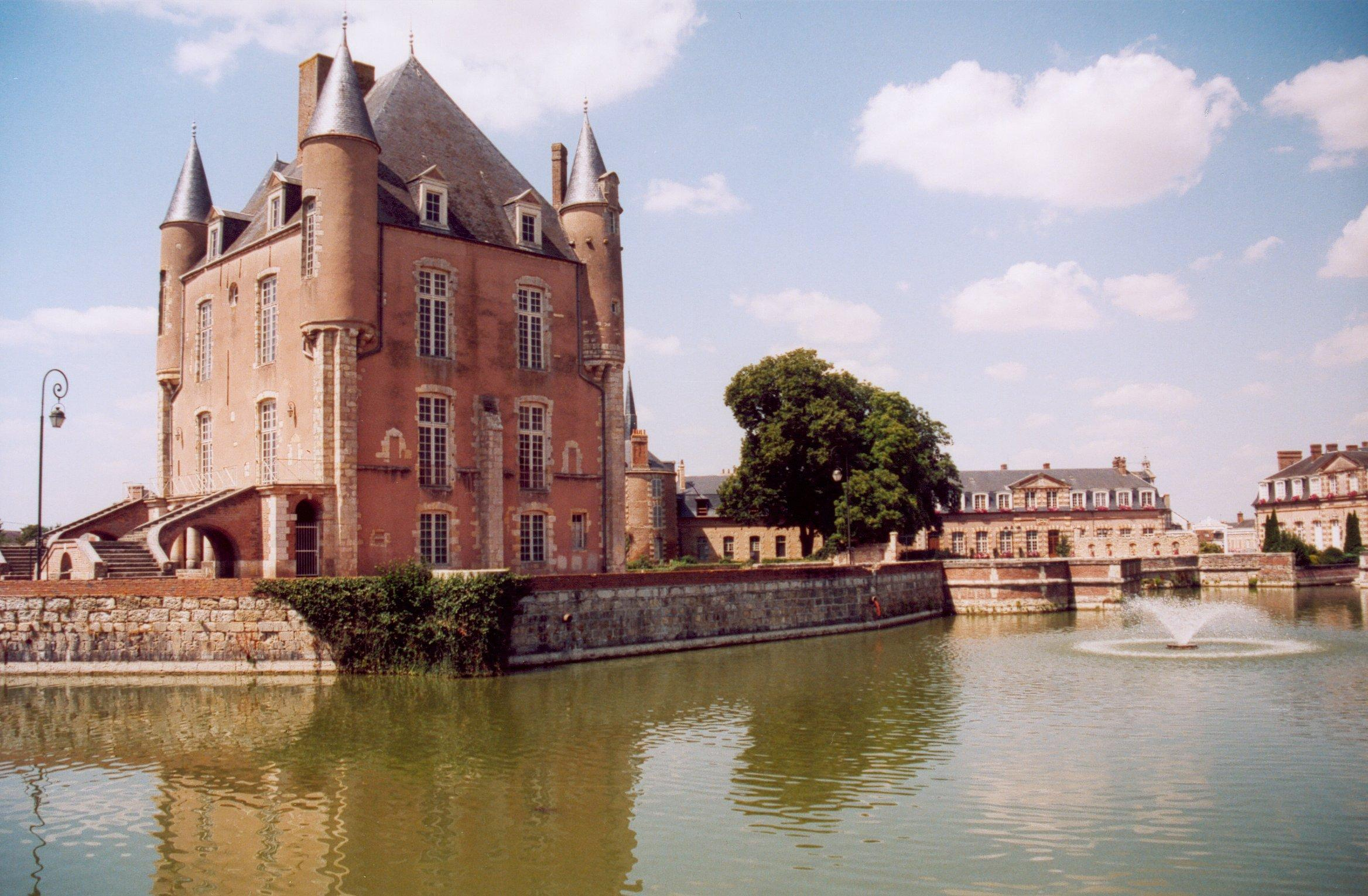
