= Bougey =

- Commune
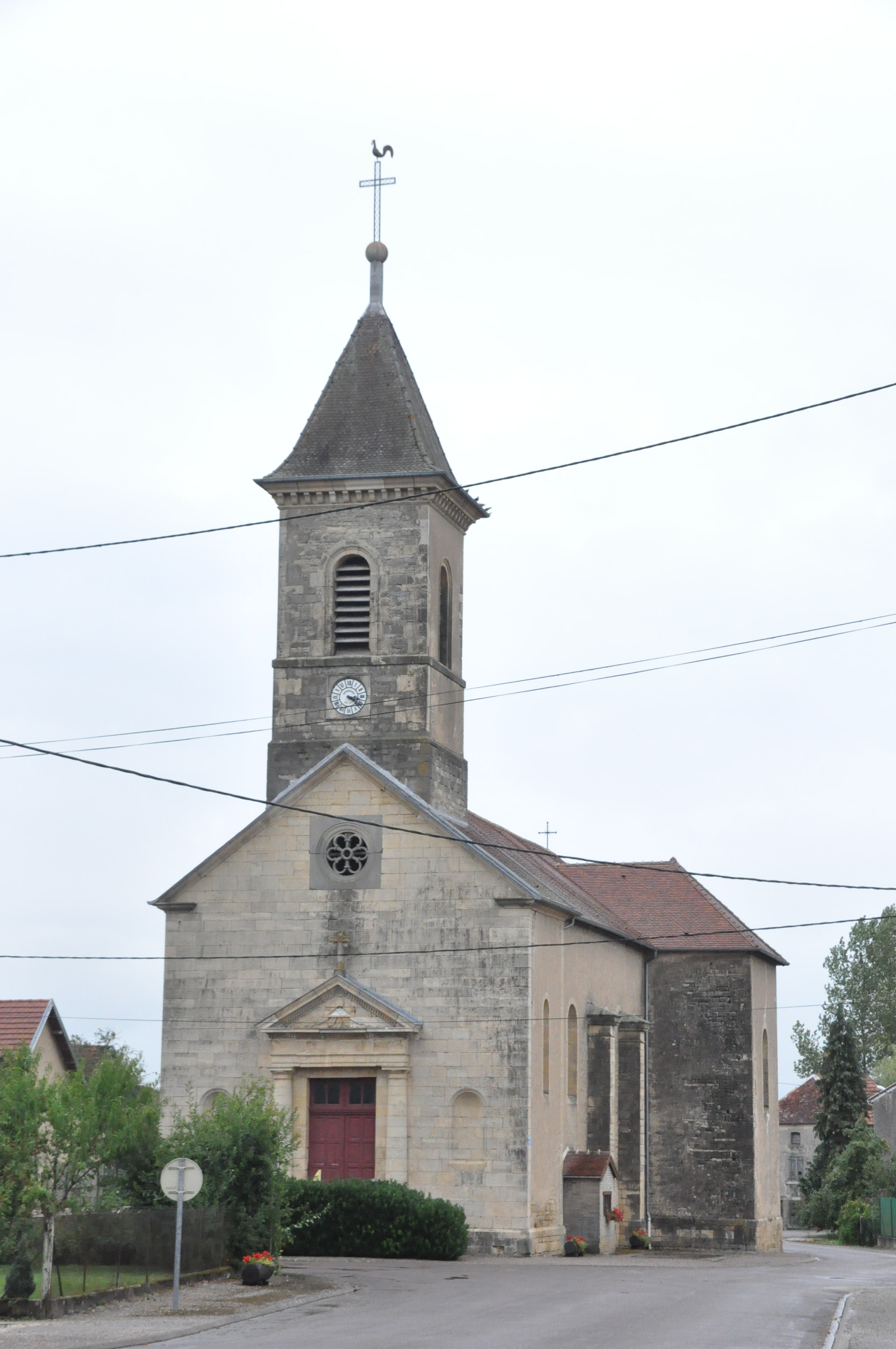
- The church in Bougey
- Location of Bougey
- Location within France Location within Bourgogne-Franche-Comté
- Coordinates: 47°46′57″N 5°51′42″E
- Country: France
- Region: Bourgogne-Franche-Comté
- Department: Haute-Saône
- Arrondissement: Vesoul
- Canton: Jussey

Government
  - Mayor (2022–2026): Julie Aubriet
- Area^{1}: 8.56 km^{2} (3.31 sq mi)
- Highest elevation: 319 m (1,047 ft)
- Lowest elevation: 218 m (715 ft)
- Population (2023): 103
  - Density: 12.0/km^{2} (31.2/sq mi)
- Time zone: UTC+01:00 (CET)
  - Summer (DST): UTC+02:00 (CEST)
- INSEE/Postal code: 70078 /70500
- ^{1} French Land Register data, which excludes lakes, ponds, glaciers > 1 km^{2} (0.386 sq mi or 247 acres) and river estuaries.

Bougey (French pronunciation: [buʒɛ]) is a commune in the Haute-Saône department in the region of Bourgogne-Franche-Comté in eastern France.

== See also ==
- Communes of the Haute-Saône department
