= Anne de Noailles, 1st Duke of Noailles =

17th-century French nobleman and soldier

Anne de Noailles
- 1st Duke of Noailles
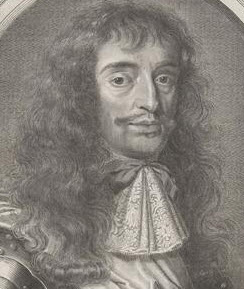
- Anne de Noailles, 1st Duke of Noailles
- Born: after 1613; Kingdom of France
- Died: 15 February 1678; Paris, France
- Noble family: Noailles
- Spouse: Louise Boyer
- Father: François de Noailles, Count of Ayen
- Mother: Rose de Roquelaure

Anne de Noailles, 1st Duke of Noailles (died 15 February 1678) was captain-general of the province of Roussillon, and in 1663 was created Duke of Noailles and peer of France. He played an important part in the Fronde and the early years of the reign of Louis XIV.

Two of Noailles' sons, Anne-Jules, 2nd Duke of Noailles, and Louis-Antoine, Cardinal de Noailles, raised the Noailles family to its greatest fame. A grandson married Françoise Charlotte d'Aubigné, niece of Madame de Maintenon.

== Notes ==
French nobility
Preceded by New creation	Duc de Noailles; 1663–1678	Succeeded by Anne-Jules de Noailles
