= Louise Boyer =

French courtier

Anne Louise Boyer
- Duchess of Noailles
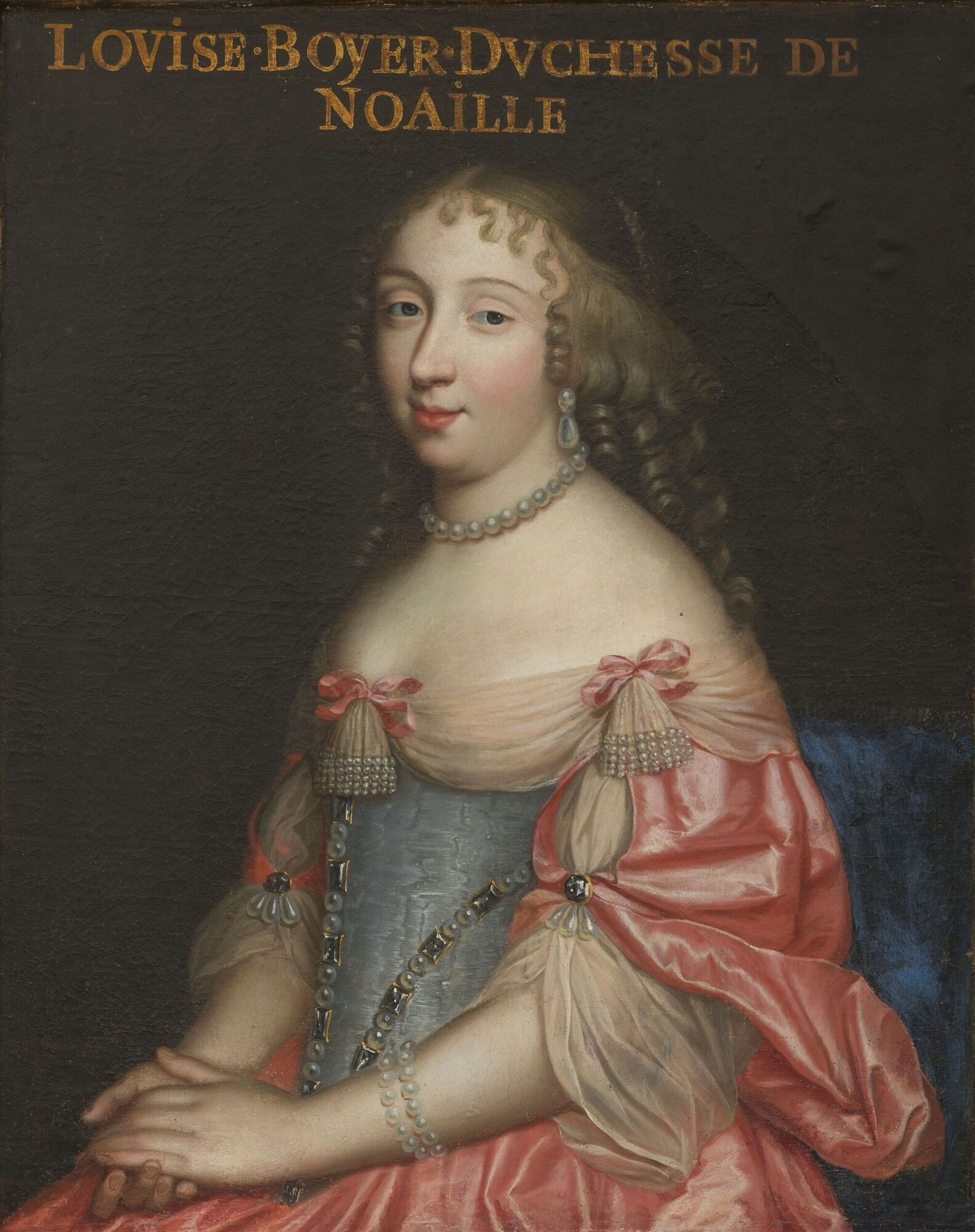
- Born: 1632
- Died: 22 May 1697 (aged 64–65); Paris, France
- Spouse: Anne de Noailles
- Father: Antoine Boyer
- Mother: Françoise de Wignacourt

Anne Louise, Duchess of Noailles (1632–22 May 1697), was a French courtier. She served as dame d'atour to the queen dowager of France, Anne of Austria, from 1657 until 1666.

The daughter of Antoine Boyer, Lord of Sainte-Geneviève-des-Bois, and Françoise de Wignacourt, Louise married Anne de Noailles, who became the first Duke of Noailles in 1646. He predeceased her, dying on 15 February 1678. She did not remarry and died on 22 May 1697.

She had two notable children:

- Anne Jules de Noailles, 2nd Duke of Noailles (1650–1708) and Marshal of France, married Marie-Françoise de Bournonville.
- Louis Antoine de Noailles, cardinal de Noailles (1651–1729), never married.
