= Anne Jules de Noailles, 2nd Duke of Noailles =

17th and 18th-century French nobleman and general

Anne Jules de Noailles
- Duke of Noailles
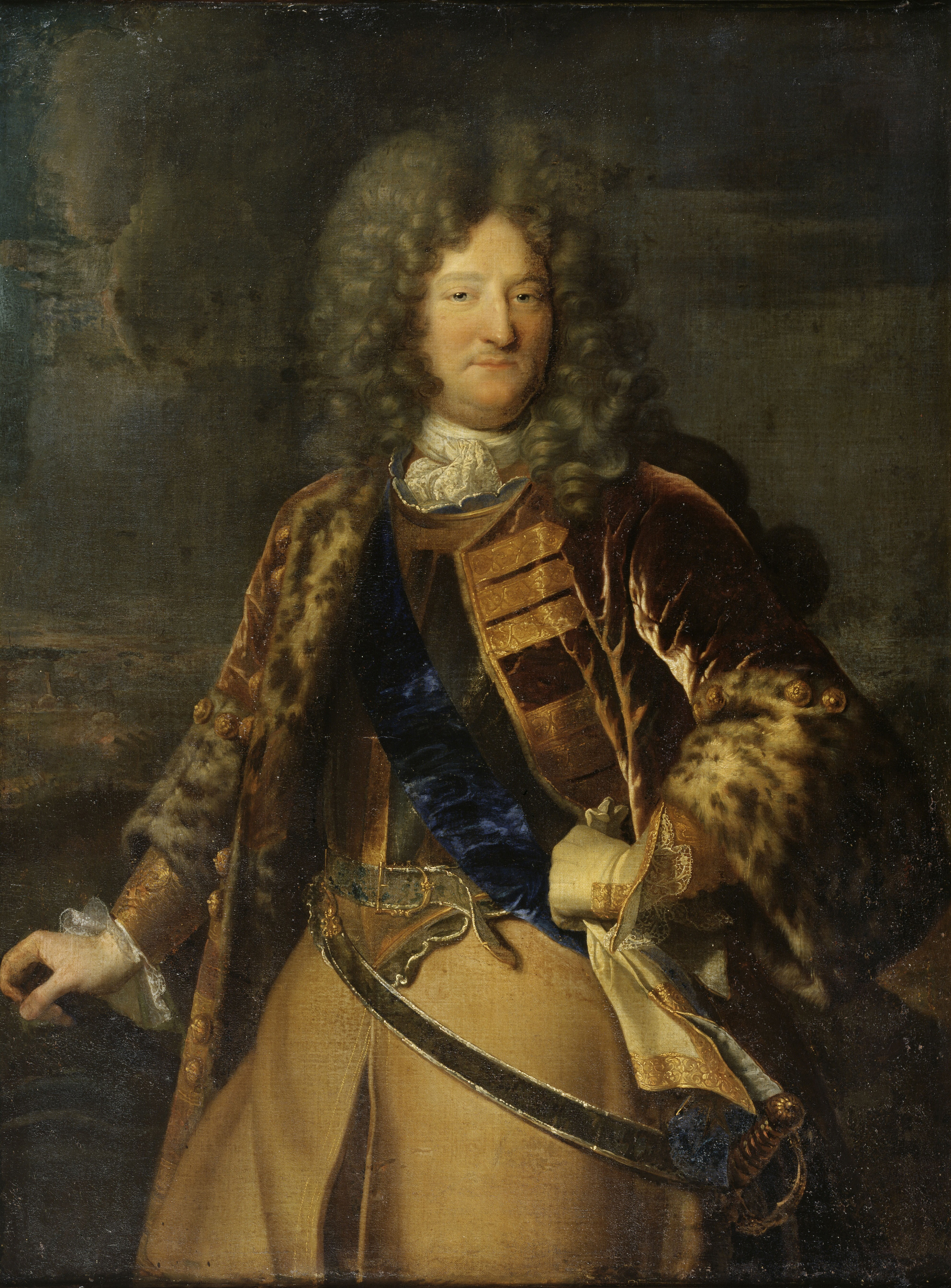
- Portrait by Hyacinthe Rigaud, probably expanded from a 1691 half-length version.
- Born: 5 February 1650; Paris, France
- Died: 2 October 1708 (aged 58); Versailles, France
- Noble family: Noailles
- Spouse: Marie-Françoise de Bournonville
- Issue: Marie Christine, Duchess of Gramont; Louis Paul, Count o Ayen; Marie Charlotte, Marquise of Coëtquen; Adrien Maurice, Duke of Noailles; Lucie Félicité, Duchess of Estrées; Marie Thérèse, Duchess of La Vallière; Emmanuel Jules. Count of Noailles; Marie Françoise, Marquise of Lavardin; Marie Victoire, Countess of Toulouse; Marie Émilie, Marquise of Châteauregnaud; Jules Adrien, Count of Noailles; Anne Louise, Marquise Mancini
- Father: Anne de Noailles
- Mother: Louise Boyer

Anne Jules de Noailles, 2nd Duke of Noailles (5 February 1650 – 2 October 1708) was one of the chief generals of France towards the end of the reign of Louis XIV, and, after raising the regiment of Noailles in 1689, he commanded in Spain during both the War of the Grand Alliance and the War of the Spanish Succession, and was made marshal of France in 1693.

== Early life ==
Anne Jules was the son of Anne de Noailles, 1st Duke of Noailles and his wife, Louise Boyer.

== Career ==
Anne Jules acceded to the title of Duke of Noailles on his father's death in 1678. As one of the chief generals of France towards the end of the reign of Louis XIV, he raised the Noailles Regiment in 1689. He commanded in Spain during both the War of the Grand Alliance and the War of the Spanish Succession, and was made marshal of France on 27 March 1693.

== Marriage and issue ==
Anne Jules was married to Marie-Françoise de Bournonville. They had :

1. Marie Christine de Noailles (1672–1748), who married Antoine de Gramont, Duke of Gramont.
2. Louis Marie de Noailles (b. 1675)
3. Louis Paul de Noailles (b. 1676), styled Count of Ayen.
4. Marie Charlotte de Noailles (1677–1723), married Malo, Marquis of Coëtquen
5. Adrien Maurice de Noailles, 3rd Duke of Noailles (1678–1766), who married Françoise-Charlotte d'Aubigné, niece of Madame de Maintenon.
6. Anne Louise de Noailles (b. 1679)
7. Jean Anne de Noailles (b. 1681)
8. Julie Françoise de Noailles (b. 1682)
9. Lucie Félicité de Noailles (b. 1683), who married Victor Marie d'Estrées in 1698.
10. Marie-Thérèse de Noailles (1684–1784), who married Charles François de la Baume Le Blanc, duc de La Vallière.
11. Emmanuel Jules de Noailles (1686–1702), styled Count of Noailles.
12. Marie Françoise de Noailles (b. 1687), who married Emmanuel de Beaumanoir, Marquis of Lavardin
13. Marie Victoire de Noailles (1688–1766), who married Louis de Pardaillan, Marquis of Gondrin. After his death in 1712, she married his half-uncle, the Count of Toulouse (one of King Louis XIV's illegitimate sons).
14. Marie Émilie de Noailles (1689–1723), who married Emmanuel Rousselet, Marquis of Châteauregnaud.
15. Jules Adrien de Noailles (1690–1710), styled Count of Noailles.
16. Marie Uranie de Noailles (b. 1691), who became a nun.
17. Anne Louise de Noailles (b. 1695), who married François Le Tellier, Marquis of Louvois in 1716, and had issue. After his death, she married Jacques Hippolyte Mancini, Marquis Mancini, son of Philippe Jules Mancini, and had issue.

Upon his death, he was succeeded by his eldest surviving son, Adrien-Maurice. One of his daughters, Marie Victoire, married one of King Louis XIV's illegitimate sons, the Count of Toulouse.

== See also ==
- Battle of the river Ter (1694)

== Sources ==
- Bryant, Mark (2020). Queen of Versailles: Madame de Maintenon, First Lady of Louis XIV's France. McGill-Queen's University Press. ISBN 9780228004325.
- Orr, Clarissa Campbell, ed. (2004). Queenship in Europe 1660-1815: The Role of the Consort. Cambridge University Press. ISBN 9780521814225.

=== Attribution ===
Anne Jules de Noailles, 2nd Duke of Noailles House of Noailles Born: 5 February 1650 Died: 2 October 1708
French nobility
| Preceded by Anne | Duke of Noailles; 1677–1708 | Succeeded by Adrien-Maurice |
