= For-l'Évêque =

Demolished prison in Paris, France

Coordinates: 48.858°N 2.344°E

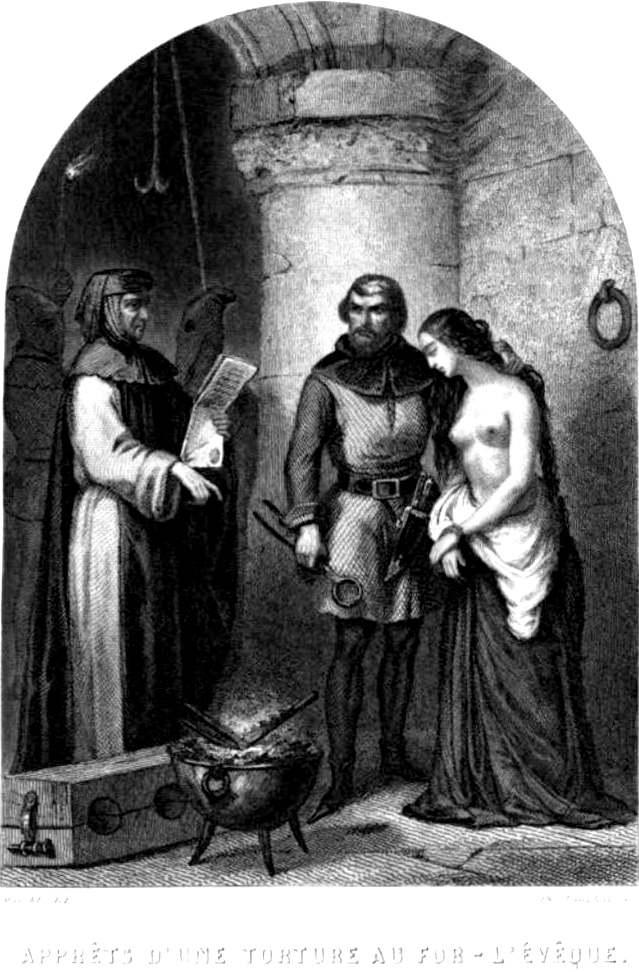
The instruments of torture at For-l’Évêque.

The For-l’Évêque was a prison in Paris. It was in operation from 1674 until 1780, and was demolished at the end of the XVIIIth century.

== History ==
Situated in the rue Saint-Germain-l’Auxerrois, the « For-l’Évêque » was in early times the seat of the jurisdiction of the bishops of Paris (forum episcopi) where the bishops and the metropolitan chapter of the town exercised, over the adjacent lands called Tudella the law of high and low justice according to an unwritten law that was part of immemorial custom.

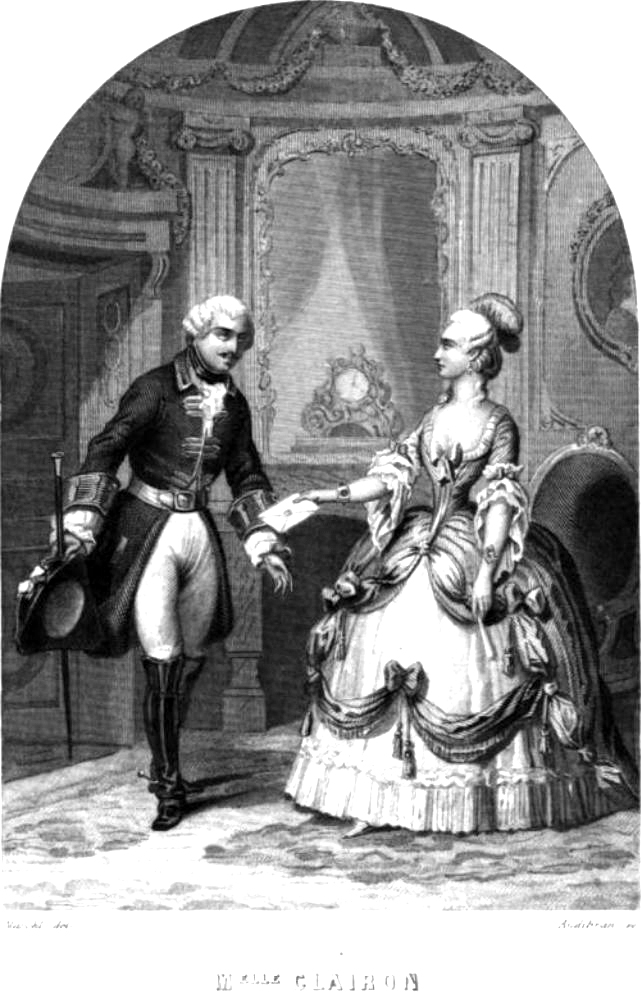
Mademoiselle Clairon led to the For-l’Évêque.

== Sources ==
- Jules Édouard Alboise du Pujol, Auguste Maquet, Les Prisons de l’Europe, t. 1, Paris, Administration de librairie, 1850.
- Gaston Maugras, Les Comédiens hors la loi, Calmann Lévy, Paris, Librairie Nouvelle, 1887.
