= Bellegarde, Loiret =

Bellegarde
- Commune
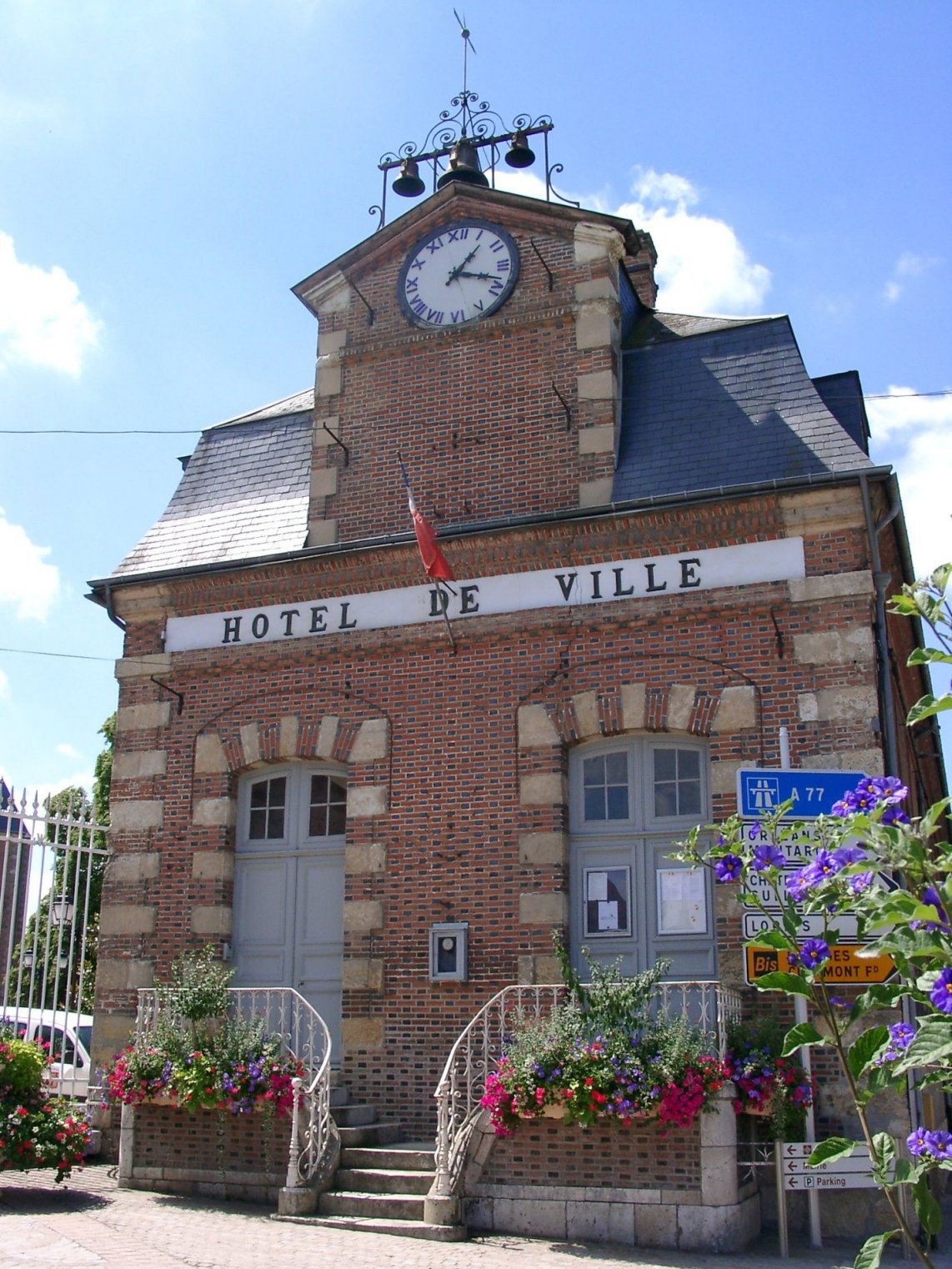
- Town hall

- Coat of arms
- Location of Bellegarde
- Location within France Location within Centre-Val de Loire
- Coordinates: 47°59′24″N 2°26′37″E
- Country: France
- Region: Centre-Val de Loire
- Department: Loiret
- Arrondissement: Montargis
- Canton: Lorris

Government
  - Mayor (2025–2026): Romain Rondeau
- Area^{1}: 4.93 km^{2} (1.90 sq mi)
- Highest elevation: 136 m (446 ft)
- Lowest elevation: 105 m (344 ft)
- Population (2023): 1,440
  - Density: 292/km^{2} (757/sq mi)
- Time zone: UTC+01:00 (CET)
  - Summer (DST): UTC+02:00 (CEST)
- INSEE/Postal code: 45031 /45270
- ^{1} French Land Register data, which excludes lakes, ponds, glaciers > 1 km^{2} (0.386 sq mi or 247 acres) and river estuaries.

Bellegarde (French pronunciation: [bɛlɡaʁd]) is a commune in the Loiret department in north-central France.

== Population ==
Historical population
Year	Pop.	±% p.a.
1968	1,124	—
1975	1,455	+3.76%
1982	1,425	−0.30%
1990	1,442	+0.15%
1999	1,558	+0.86%
2007	1,678	+0.93%
2012	1,770	+1.07%
2017	1,620	−1.76%
2023	1,440	−1.94%
Source: INSEE

== See also ==
- Communes of the Loiret department
