= Duke of Antin =

The duchy of Antin was a French duchy created in 1711 by the promotion of the marquisate of Antin (held by the Pardaillan de Gondrin family) into a "duché-pairie". It merged the Marquisate of Antin and the baronies, lands and lordships of Bellisle, Mieslan, Tuilerie de Pis, Certias and their dependencies.

== List of dukes of Antin ==
- 1711–1722 : Louis Antoine de Pardaillan de Gondrin (1665–1736), 1st duke of Antin (creation).
- 1722–1743 : Louis de Pardaillan de Gondrin (1707–1743), 2nd duke of Antin, grandson of the former
- 1743–1757 : Louis de Pardaillan de Gondrin (1727–1757), 3rd duke of Antin, son of the former.
