= Louis Henri de Pardaillan de Gondrin =

French nobleman

- Born: Louis Henri; 1640
- Died: 1 December 1691 (aged 50–51)
- Other name: Marquis de Montespan
- Known for: Husband of a mistress of Louis XIV
- Spouse: Madame de Montespan
- Children: Marie Christine de Pardaillan de Gondrin; Louis Antoine de Pardaillan de Gondrin

Louis Henri de Pardaillan de Gondrin, marquis de Montespan (1640 – 1 December 1691) was a French nobleman, most notable as the husband of Louis XIV's mistress Madame de Montespan.

== Life ==
He was the son of Roger-Hector de Pardaillan de Gondrin, marquis of Antin, and Marie-Christine de Zamet de Murat. In February 1663 he married Françoise-Athénaïs de Rochechouart de Mortemart and their marriage became a love match .

However, for Mademoiselle de Mortemart, a famed beauty who loved court life, an alliance with a quite obscure noble family from south-western France was not enough and her husband (always short of money) was always away on his judicial duties; she thus became the mistress of Louis XIV in 1667, bearing him seven children. When her husband found out, instead of accepting it as was usual to cuckolded husbands of the era (especially when it was the king doing the cuckolding), he raised a scandal at court, challenged the king one day at Saint-Germain-en-Laye and decorated his carriage with antlers (like horns, a traditional symbol of the cuckolded husband). He was promptly imprisoned in the For-l'Évêque, then exiled to his lands. This did not stop his agitation, and not only did Montespan go to Paris nearly every year between 1670 and 1686, he also commanded an annual requiem mass to be sung for his wife during her lifetime and forced his two young children to attend a funeral for their 'dead' mother.

== In fiction ==
- (in French) Jean Teulé, Le Montespan, Julliard, 2008, Grand Prix du roman historique

In French theatre, the play "Le Montespan" shows in Paris on les Grands Boulevards, April 2023.
