= House of La Fayette =

Noble house from France

House of La Fayette French: Maison La Fayette Motier de La Fayette
- Nobles of the Sword
- Gules, a bend or, with a bordure vair
- Country: Kingdom of France
- Founded: 12th century
- Founder: Unknown
- Final ruler: Oscar Thomas Gilbert Motier de La Fayette
- Titles: Marquis de La Fayette; Comte de La Fayette; Seigneur de La Fayette; Barron de Vissac
- Dissolution: 1881
- Cadet branches: Motier de Champetières

The House of La Fayette is a French family of Nobles of the Sword, from the province of Auvergne, established during the Middle Ages by the lords of the fief of La Fayette held by the senior branch of the Motier family. The house achieved great distinction including the dignity of Marshal of France during the Hundred Years' War.

== History and members ==
Its most illustrious members are:

- Gilbert Motier de La Fayette (1380–1464): Lord of La Fayette, Marshal of France during the Hundred Years' War.
- François Leclerc du Tremblay (1577–1638), also known as Père Joseph: a French Capuchin friar, confidant and agent of Cardinal Richelieu, son of Marie Motier de La Fayette.
- Louise de La Fayette (1618–1665): favourite of Louis XIII.
- Madame de La Fayette (1634–1693): author of La Princesse de Clèves, France's first historical novel and one of the earliest novels in literature
- Michel du Motier, Marquis de La Fayette (1731–1759) French soldier and father of Gilbert du Motier, Marquis de Lafayette
- Gilbert du Motier, Marquis de Lafayette (1757–1834): French soldier and politician, an important participant in the American Revolution, the French Revolution of 1789 and the July Revolution of 1830.
- Adrienne de La Fayette (1759–1807): wife of above.
- Georges Washington de La Fayette (1779–1849): a French soldier and politician, son of the two above
- Virginie de Pusy Lafayette (born 1970), French clubwoman and active officer in the Daughters of the American Revolution

=== Marquisate de La Fayette ===
The fief La Fayette was raised to a marquisate by Letters patent in about 1690.

Brigadier des armées René-Armand Count and Marquis de La Fayette (1659–1694), son of Madame de La Fayette (1634–1693), and François Motier, comte de La Fayette (1616–1683), died on 12 September 1694 of an illness in Landau during the Nine Years' War. In his will of 11 May 1692, he bequeathed to his sixth cousin Charles Motier Champétières, Baron de Vissac (though an 11th generation descendant of their common patrilineality ancestor Pons Motier de La Fayette, a knight of the Seventh Crusade) and his male descendants; the name and property of the house of La Fayette, as the substitute for his brother Louis, Abbot of Notre-Dame de Valmont, and his daughter Marie-Madeleine, but leaves the enjoyment of the land of La Fayette to her. He did this to continue the name and title.

Edward Motier de La Fayette, Seigneur de Champétières, marquis de Vissac (1669–1740) takes the name of "La Fayette", pursuant to the substitution made in favor of his father (Charles Motier Champétières, Baron de Vissac).

Marie-Madeleine Motier de La Fayette (1691–1717) daughter of René-Armand and wife of Charles Louis Bretagne de La Trémoille Prince of Taranto, Duke of Thouars, peer of France, by will of 3 July 1717, transmits the land of Lafayette to her 6 years old cousin Jacques-Roch Motier (son of Edward Motier de La Fayette), as the representative of the Champétières branch of the family already substituted by her father in the name and title of the Seigneur of La Fayette.

Jacques-Roch Motier de La Fayette (1711–1734) passed marquisate de La Fayette to his brother, Michel du Motier, Marquis de La Fayette (1731–1759), upon Jacques-Roch's death on 18 January 1734 while fighting the Austrians at Milan in the War of Polish Succession.

On 1 August 1759, Michel du Motier de Lafayette died by being struck by a cannonball while fighting a British-led coalition at the Battle of Minden in Westphalia, the marquisate de La Fayette went to his son, Gilbert du Motier, Marquis de Lafayette (1757–1834).

=== Descendants of Gilbert du Motier, Marquis de Lafayette and Marie Adrienne Françoise de Noailles ===
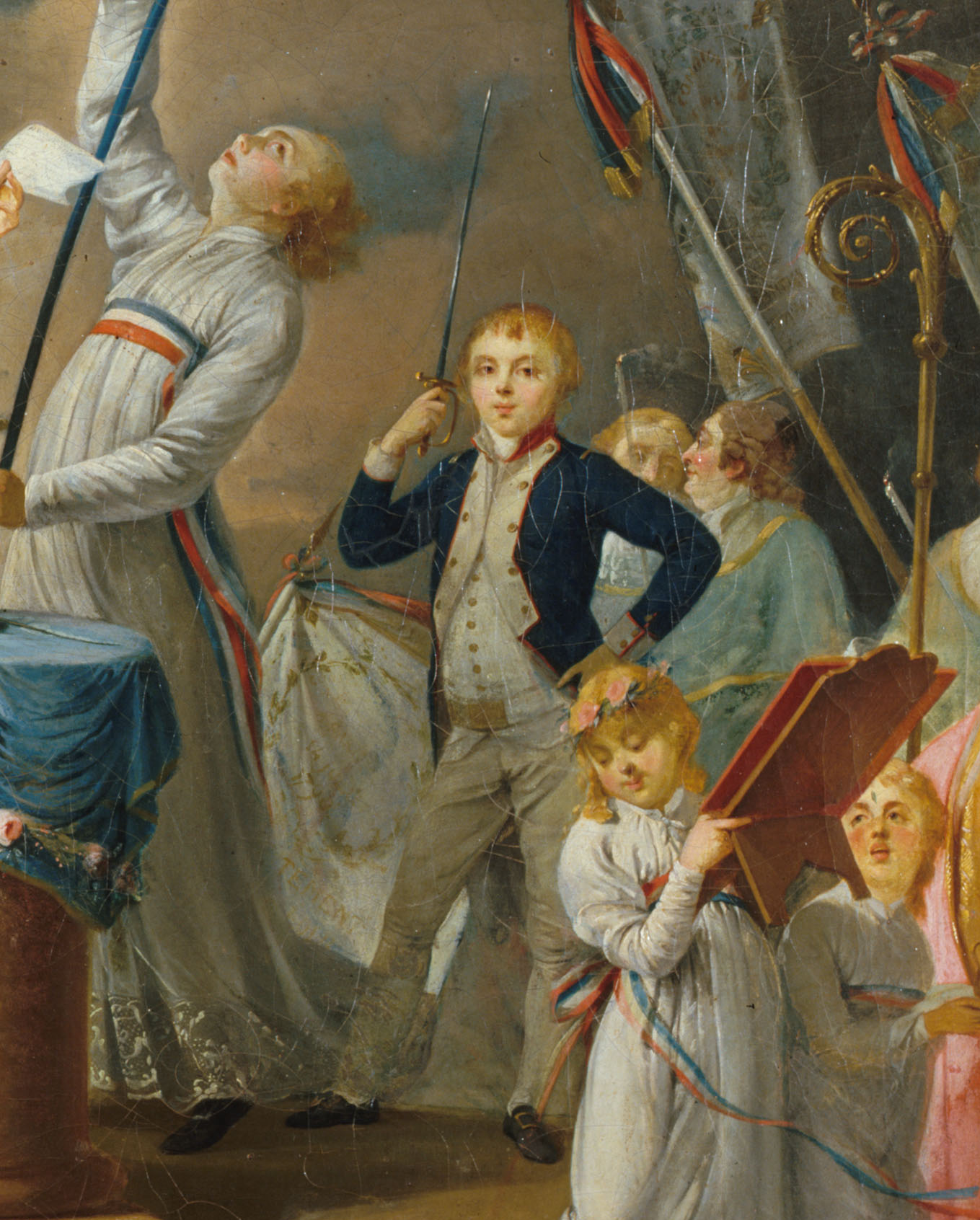
The young Georges Washington de La Fayette at the Fête de la Fédération, 14 July 1790.

Gilbert du Motier, Marquis de Lafayette married Marie Adrienne Françoise de Noailles (2 November 1759 – 24 December 1807), the daughter of Jean-Paul-François, 5th duc de Noailles, and Henriette Anne Louise d'Aguesseau. They had four children: Henriette (1776–1778), Anastasie Louise Pauline du Motier (1777–1863), Georges Washington Louis Gilbert du Motier (1779–1849), and Marie Antoinette Virginie du Motier (1782–1849).

Georges de Lafayette married Francoise Emilie Destrutt de Tracy, daughter of the Comte de Tracy, in 1802; they had three daughters and two sons: Nathalie, who married Adolphe Périer; Mathilde, who married Maurice de Pusy (1799–1864, son of Jean-Xavier Bureau de Pusy); Clementine, who married "Gustave" Auguste Bonnin de La Bonninière de Beaumont; Oscar Gilbert Lafayette (1815–1881), liberal politician; and Edmond (1818–1890) also a liberal politician. Mathilde and Maurice had a son, Octave Bureaux de Pusy (1832–1889). Nathalie and Adolphe had a daughter, Octavie Périer(1826–1876), who married Sigismond Pourcet de Sahune (1810–1903).

A 6 February 1892 presidential decree authorized the great-great-grandsons of the general, Paul Pourcet de Sahune (1861–1926), Gaston Pourcet de Sahune (1855–1942) and Gilbert Bureaux de Pusy(1871–1950), to add to their respective names "du Motier de Lafayette."

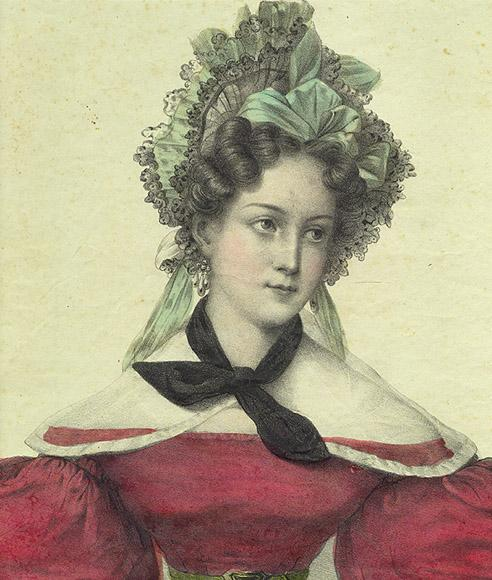
Marie Antoinette Virginie du Motier

Virginie married Louis de Lasteyrie on 20 April 1803. They had four children: Pauline, who married Charles de Rémusat, Mélanie, who married Francisque de Corcelle (a friend of de Tocqueville), in 1831, Octavie, and their son, Adrien Jules de Lasteyrie (1810–1883) married Olivia de Rohan-Chabot (1813–1899), the daughter of the émigré Louis de Rohan, Vicomte de Chabot, and Lady Charlotte Fitzgerald, daughter of the second Duke of Leinster.

Mélanie and Francisque had a daughter Marie Henriette Hélène Marthe Tircuy de Corcelle (6 June 1832, Paris – 17 November 1902, Paris), who married Charles Adolphe Pineton de Chambrun (10 August 1831, Marjevols – 13 September 1891, New York), a lawyer from New York, at the Église de la Madeleine on 8 June 1859.

Adrien Jules and Olivia had a son, Louis de Lasteyrie who married Olivia Mills Goodlake; they had two children, Gui de Lasteyrie (b. 1878), and Louis de Lasteyrie (1881–1955). Louis married Louise Chodron de Courcel, in 1908.

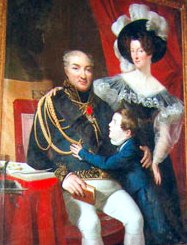
Juste-Charles César de Faÿ de La Tour-Maubourg with his wife, Anastasie de Lafayette, and child

Juste-Charles de la Tour-Maubourg (Motte-Galaure, Drôme 8 June 1744, 28 May 1831), married Anastasie de Lafayette; they had two children: Célestine Louise Henriette de Fay de La Tour-Maubourg (1799 – 16 July 1893), and Jenny de Fay de La Tour-Maubourg (6 September 1812 – 15 April 1897). He was a French soldier and politician during the French Revolution, and the First French Empire. His father was Claude Florimond du Faÿ (1712–1790) and his mother was Marie Françoise de Vacheron de Bermont (b.1712). His younger brother, Marie Victor de Fay, marquis de Latour-Maubourg, was a Cavalry Corps commander, survived the Russian Campaign and was wounded at the battle of Leipzig.

They had two daughters, Célestine, who married the Baron de Brigode, (who was mayor of Mayor of Annappes from 1814 to 1848), and Jenny, who married the comte Hector Perrone di San-Martino (12 January 1789 – 29 March 1849), on 2 February 1833. His father was Carlo Giuseppe Perrone di San Martino, and his mother was Paola d'Argentero-Bersezio. Henry Clay attended the wedding.

Ettore Perrone di San Martino graduated from Saint-Cyr in 1806, was wounded at the Battle of Wagram, and three times at the Battle of Montmirail. He was mortally wounded at the Battle of Novara in the Piedmont, Italy, on 22 March 1849, where he commanded the left division.

Jenny and Ettore had two sons, Paolo Luigi Perrone di San Martino (1834–1897), and Roberto Perrone di San Martino (1836–1900), and a daughter, Luisa Perrone di San Martino (1 October 1838 – 14 November 1880), who married Count Félix Rignon (1829–1914). Luisa and Félix Rignon had two children, Édouard Rignon (1861–1932), and Maria Rignon (15 March 1858 – 27 March 1950).

Édouard Rignon married Marie Nicolis de Robilant (24 March 1870 – 5 October 1960). One of their daughters, Carolina Rignon (17 February 1904 – 20 September 1975) married Charles VII, Prince of Löwenstein-Wertheim-Rosenberg. They had seven children, among whom: Maria (b. 1935, married to Archduke Joseph Árpád of Austria, with issue), Josephine (b. 1937, married to Prince Alexander of Liechtenstein, with issue), Christiane (b. 1940, married to Archduke Michael of Austria, Joseph Árpád's brother, with issue), Aloys-Konstantin IX, Prince of Löwenstein-Wertheim-Rosenberg (b. 1941, married to Princess Anastasia of Prussia, daughter of Prince Hubertus of Prussia, with issue), and Lioba (b. 1946, married to Moritz Eugen, Prince of Oettingen-Oettingen and Oettingen-Wallerstein, with issue).

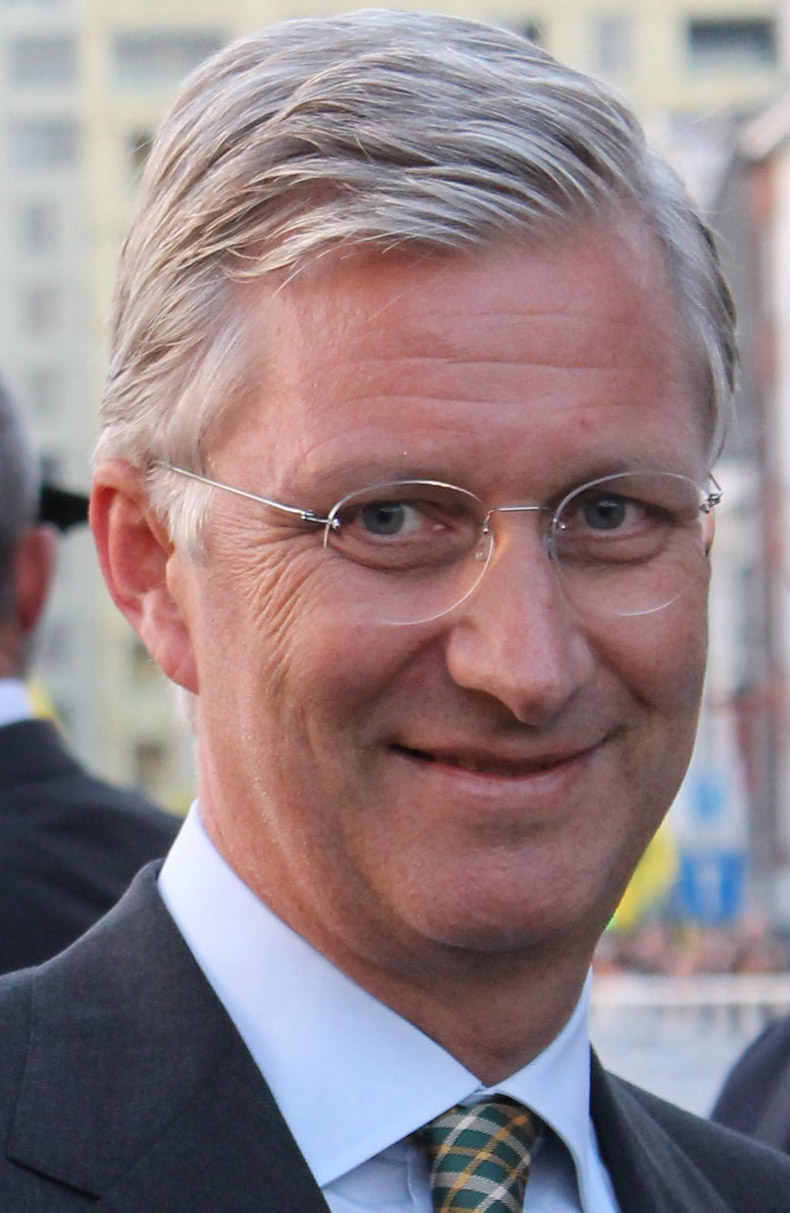
King Philippe of Belgium

Maria Rignon married Count Augusto Gazelli di Rossana e di Sebastiano. They had a daughter, Luisa Gazelli (19 May 1896 – 27 April 1989), who married Don Fulco Ruffo di Calabria (12 August 1884 – 23 August 1946) in 1919, and were parents to Donna Paola Ruffo di Calabria (11 September 1937–). Donna Paola Ruffo di Calabria married Albert II of Belgium (6 June 1934–) at St. Goedele Cathedral in Brussels on 2 July 1959. Their son King Philippe of Belgium (15 April 1960 -) became king on his father's abdication in 2013.

Count Jean-François Pineton de Chambrun, the third husband of Raine Spencer, Countess Spencer, is also a descendant of Gilbert and Adrienne Motier de La Fayette.

Virginie de Pusy Lafayette is a 7th-generation direct descendant of Gilbert and Adrienne Motier de La Fayette.

== Heraldry, and motto ==
Coat of arms of La Fayette
Escutcheon Gules, a bend or, with a bordure vair Motto CUR NON? (Latin for "Why not?" (ironic/rhetorical))

== Family tree ==
Genealogy of the Motier de la Fayette family from the earliest time to the 19th century

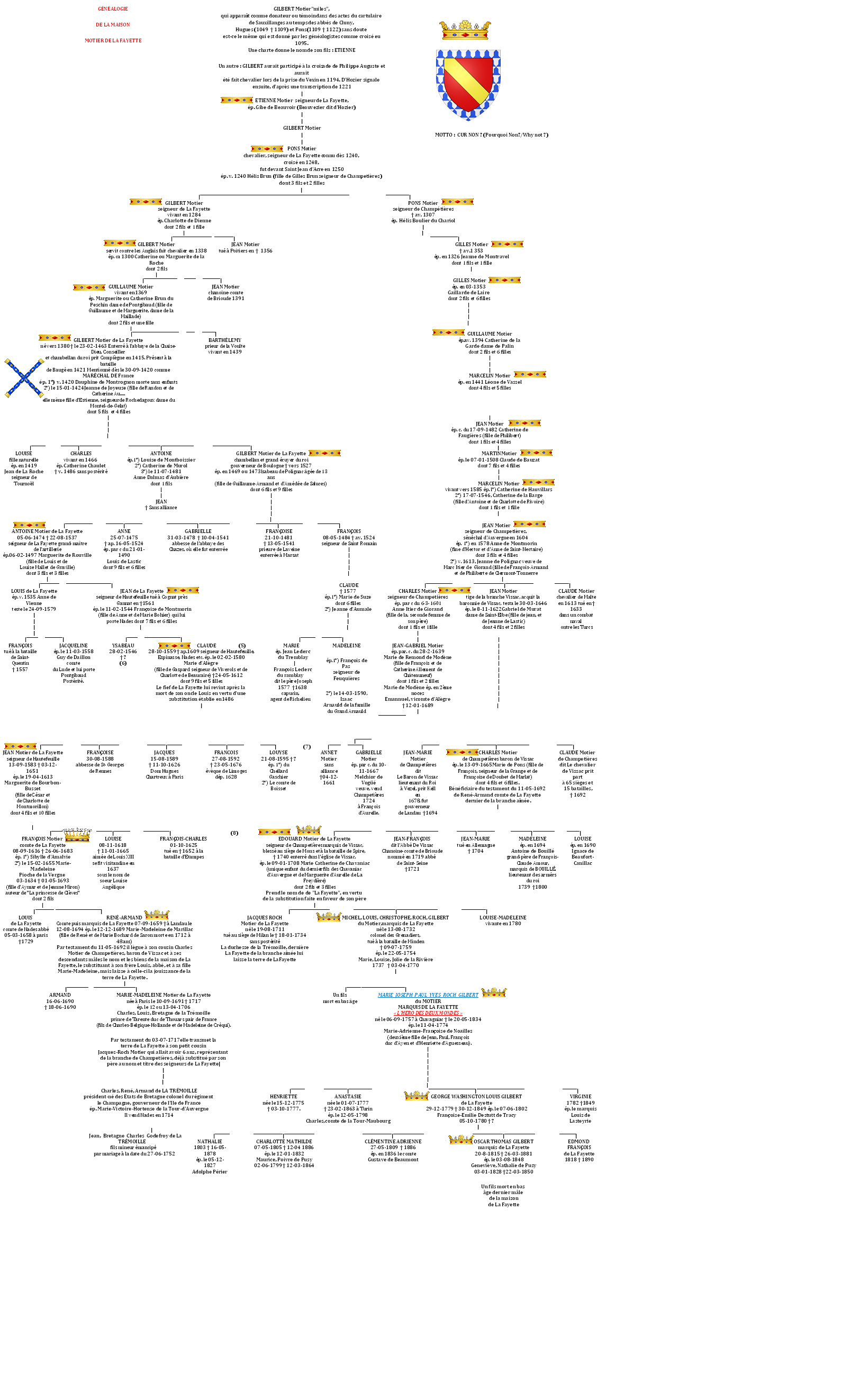
Genealogy of the Motier de la Fayette family.

Notes:

Based on sources:

- Paul, Georges; Balme, Dr Pierre; Verrier, Marie-Louise Le (1951). Une grande famille d'Auvergne Les MOTIER DE LA FAYETTE. imprimerie de Bussac. Parution. OCLC 459328925.
- Morant, comte Georges de (1928). Tableau de la filiation de la maison Motier de La Fayette. Paris: L'International college of heraldry. OCLC 2945700.
- Ojardias, Albert; Pusy-La Fayette, comte Jean de (1933). Pourquoi La Fayette s'appelait-il La Fayette?. publiée dans l'Almanach de Brioude. pp. 139–162. OCLC 44512610.

Family Tree of ancestors and descendants of Gilbert and Adrienne Motier de La Fayette

Gilbert Motier chevalier
Etienne Motier de La Fayette, seigneur de La Fayette	Gibe de Beauvoir
Gilbert Motier de La Fayette (b. 1200)
Pons Motier de La Fayette, chevalier (b. 1225)	Hélis Brun du Peschin, dame de Champétières
Pons Motier de Champetières, seigneur de Champetières (1270–1307)	Hélis de Boulier du Chariol	Gilbert Motier de La Fayette, seigneur de La Fayette (1265–1284)	Charlotte de Dienne
Gilles Motier de Champetières, seigneur de Champetières (1300–1353)	Jeanne de Montravel	Gilbert Motier de La Fayette, chevalier (1310–19 September 1356)	Marguerite de La Roche-Tournoël
Gilles Motier de Champetières, chevalier (1330–1364)	Gaillarde de Laire	Guillaume Motier de La Fayette, seigneur de Goutenoutouze (b. 1355)	Marguerite Catherine Brun du Peschin, dame de Pontgibaud
Guillaume Motier de Champetières, seigneur de Champetières (1360–1418)	Catherine de La Garde, dame de Polin	Gilbert Motier de La Fayette, Marshal of France (1390–1464)	2Jeanne de Joyeuse
Marcellin Motier de Champetières, seigneur de Champetières (1400–1462)	Léone de Vassel	Gilbert Motier de La Fayette, seigneur de la Roche-d'Agout (1440–1527)	Isabeau de Polignac
Jean Motier de Champetières, seigneur de Champetières (1445–1490)	Catherine de Faugières	Anne Motier de La Fayette	Louis de Lastic	Antoine Motier de La Fayette, seigneur de Pontgibaud (5 June 1474 – 22 August 1531)	Marguerite de Rouville
Martin Motier de Champetières, seigneur de Champetières (1485–1532)	Claude de Bauzat	Claude de Lastic	Marguerite de Farges	Jean Motier de La Fayette, seigneur de Hautefeuille	Françoise de Montmorin, dame de Nades
Marcellin Motier de Champetières, seigneur de Champetières (1515–1585)	Catherine de Hautvillard	Jehan de Lastic	Gabrielle d'Hérail	Claude Motier de La Fayette, seigneur de La Fayette (28 October 1559 – 24 May 1612)	Marie d'Alègre
Jean Motier de Champetières, sénéchal d'Auvergne (1550–1616)	Anne de Montmorin	Jeanne de Lastic	Jean de Murat	Jean Motier de La Fayette, seigneur de Chevauchée Hautefeuille (13 September 1583 – 3 December 1651)	Marguerite de Bourbon-Busset	Anne, duc de Noailles (1620–1678)	Anne Louise Boyer (1631–1697)
Jean Motier de Champetières, baron de Vissac (1585–1646)	Gabrielle de Murat, dame de Saint-Elbe	Madeleine Pioche de La Vergne (Madame de La Fayette)	François Motier de La Fayette, comte de La Fayette (1616–1683)	Louise Angélique Motier de la Fayette (1618–1685)	Anne Jules de Noailles, chevalier de Saint-Louis (1650–1708)	Marie-Françoise de Bournonville (1656–1748)
Charles Motier de Champetières, baron de Vissac (b. 1630)	Marie de Pons de la Grange	René-Armand Motier de La Fayette, comte de La Fayette (1659–1694)	Marie Madeleine de Marillac	Louis Motier de La Fayette, comte de Nades (5 March 1658 – 1729)	Adrien-Maurice de Noailles, maréchal de France (1678–1766)	Françoise Charlotte d'Aubigné (1684–1739)	2 Louis-Alexandre de Bourbon, comte de Toulouse 6 June 1678 – 1 December 1737	Marie Victoire de Noailles (1688–1766)
Edouard Motier de La Fayette, marquis de Vissac (21 November 1669 – 9 January 1740)	Marie Catherine de Suat de Chavagnac (1690–1772)	Charles Louis Bretagne de La Trémoïlle (1683–1719)	Marie Madeleine Motier de La Fayette, marquise de La Fayette (1691–1717)	Philippe de Noailles, duc de Mouchy (27 December 1715 – 27 June 1794)	Anne d'Arpajon, comtesse de Noailles (4 March 1729 – 27 June 1794)	Louis de Noailles, maréchal de France (1713–1793)	Catherine de Cossé-Brissac (13 January 1724 – 22 July 1794)	Louis Jean Marie de Bourbon, Duke of Penthièvre 16 November 1725 – 4 March 1793	Maria Teresa d'Este (6 October 1726 – 30 April 1754)
Michel Louis Christophe Motier de La Fayette, marquis de La Fayette (13 August 1731 – 9 July 1759)	Marie Louise Julie de La Rivière (1737 – 3 April 1770)	Jacques Roch Motier de La Fayette	Louise Madeleine Motier de La Fayette, demoiselle de Chavaniac	René de Froulay, Comte de Tessé (1736–1814)	Adrienne Catherine de Noailles, Comtesse de Tessé (1741–1814)	Jean-Paul de Noailles, duc d'Ayen (1739–1824)	Henriette-Anne-Louise d'Aguesseau, dame de La Grange (1737–1794)	Emmanuel-Marie-Louis, marquis de Noailles (1743–1822)	Charlotte Françoise de Hallencourt de Dromesnil
Gilbert du Motier, marquis de Lafayette	Marie Adrienne Françoise de Noailles de La Fayette	Anne Jeanne Baptiste Louise, vicomtesse d'Ayen (11 November 1758 – 22 July 1794 )	Louis Marie de Noailles, vicomte de Noailles vicomte d'Ayen (17 April 1756 – 9 January 1804)	Françoise Antoinette Louise (1763–1788), Comtesse de Thezan du Pourjol	Joachim Charles Louis de Montagu Beaune, marquis de Pouzols	Anne Paule Dominique (1766–1839), Marquise de Pouzols, Marquise de Montagu	Angélique Françoise d'Assise Rosalie (1767–1833), Marquise de Grammont	Louis Jules Cesar de Noailles	Pauline Laurette le Couteulx du Molay
Henriette de La Fayette (1776–1778)	Anastasie Louise Pauline du Motier (1777–1863)	Juste-Charles de la Tour-Maubourg	Georges Washington Louis Gilbert du Motier, (1779–1849)	"Françoise" Emilie Destutt de Tracy, (daughter of Antoine Destutt de Tracy)	Marie Antoinette Virginie du Motier (1782–1849)	Louis de Lasteyrie du Saillant, marquis de Lasteyrie (b. 1781)	Paul, 6th duc de Noailles(4 January 1802 – 29 May 1885)
Romain Joseph baron de Brigode	Célestine Louise Henriette de Fay de La Tour-Maubourg (1799 – 16 July 1893)	comte Hector Perrone di San-Martino (1789–1849)	Jenny de Fay de La Tour-Maubourg (6 September 1812 – 15 April 1897)
Adolphe Perrier	Nathalie Mortier de La Fayette (1803–1878)	Maurice de Pusy (1799–1864), (son of Jean-Xavier Bureau de Pusy)	Charlotte Mathilde Motier de La Fayette (1805–1886)	Gustave Auguste Bonnin de La Bonninière de Beaumont, chevalier de la Légion d'honneur (1802–1866)	Clémentine Adrienne Motier de La Fayette	Oscar Gilbert Lafayette (1815–1881)	Edmond de La Fayette
Octavie Perrier	Sigiemond Pourcet de Sahune	Octave Bureaux de Pusy	Berthe Lafebvre de Plinval
Paul Pourcet de Sahune du Mortier de La Fayette ` (1861–1926)	Gaston Pourcet de Sahune du Mortier de La Fayette (1855–1942)	Gilbert Bureaux de Pusy du Mortier de La Fayette (1871–1950)
Charles de Rémusat	Pauline de Lasteyrie	Francisque de Corcelle	Melanine de Lasteyrie	Octavie de Lasteyrie	Adrien Jules de Lasteyrie (1810–1883)	Olivia de Rohan-Chabot (1813–1899)
Paolo Luigi, Conte Perrone di San Martino (1834–1897)	Roberto Perrone di San Martino (1836–1900)	Félix, comte Rignon (1829–1914)	Louise Perrone di San Martino (1838–1880)	Charles Adolphe Pineton de Chambrun (1831–1891)	Marie Henriette Hélène Marthe Tircuy de Corcelle (1832–1902)	Louis de Lasteyrie	Olivia Mills Goodlake
Augusto Gazelli Count di Rossana e di Sebastiano	Maria Rignon (15 March 1858 – 27 March 1950)	Édouard Rignon (1861–1932)	Marie Nicolis de Robilant (24 March 1870 – 5 October 1960)	Jacques Aldebert de Chambrun (1872– 1962)	Clara Eleanor Longworth (1873–1954) (sister of Nicholas Longworth)	Gui de Lasteyrie (b. 1878)	Louis de Lasteyrie (1881–1955)	Louise Chodron de Courcel
Fulco Ruffo di Calabria, Duke of Guardia Lombarda (1884–1946)	Luisa Gazelli (1896–1989)	Karl II, 8th Prince of Löwenstein-Wertheim-Rosenberg	Carolina Rignon (17 February 1904 – 20 September 1975)	René de Chambrun (1906–2002)	Josée Laval (daughter of Pierre Laval)
Archduke Joseph Árpád of Austria, (1933–2017)	Princess Maria of Löwenstein-Wertheim-Rosenberg (b. 1935)	Archduke Michael of Austria (b. 1942)	Christiane (b. 1940)	Alois-Konstantin, 9th Prince of Löwenstein-Wertheim-Rosenberg (b. 1941)	Princess Anastasia of Prussia (b. 1944, daughter of Prince Hubertus of Prussia)
Carl Friedrich, Prince of Löwenstein-Wertheim-Rosenberg (b. 1966)	Baroness Stephanie von und zu Brenken (b. 1970)	Hubertus (b. 1968)	Christina (b. 1974)	Dominik (b. 1983)
Eduard (b. 1967)	Baroness Marie Therese of Gudenus	Paul (b. 1968)	Benedikt, Count of Piatti	Margherita (b. 1972)
Charles-Henri de Rambures (b. 1968)	Monika-Ilona (b. 1958)	Joseph Karl (b. 1960)	Princess Margarete of Hohenberg (b. 1963, granddaughter of Maximilian, Duke of Hohenberg)	Raymond van der Meide (b. 1959)	Maria Christine (b. 1961)	Andreas-Augustinus (b. 1963)	Countess Marie-Christine of Hartzfeldt-Dönhoff (b. 1968)	Wilhelmus de Wit (b. 1965)	Alexandra Lydia (b. 1965)	Nicolaus Franziskus (b. 1973)	Eugenia de Calonje Gurrea	Johannes Jacobus (b. 1975)	Gabriela Montenegro
Casimiro San Martino, Marquis di San Germano	Maria Cristina (1920–2003)	Bettino, Baron Ricasoli Firidolfi	Laura (1921–1972)	Fabrizio (1922–2005)	1 Maria Vaciago	Augusto (1925–1943)	Giovannella (1927–1941)	Antonello (b. 1930)	Rosa Maria Mastrogiovanni Tasca	Albert II of the Belgians	Paola, Queen of the Belgians (b. 1937)
Fulco, Prince Ruffo di Calabria (b. 1954)	^{2}Luisa Tricarico	Augusto Ruffo di Calabria (b. 1955)	Princess Irma of Windisch-Graetz	2 Count Marco Tonci Ottieri della Ciaia	Imara Ruffo di Calabria (b. 1958)	Umberto Ruffo di Calabria (b. 1960)	Marchesa Leontina Pallavicino	Alessandro Ruffo di Calabria (b. 1964)	HRH Mafalda Princess of Savoy
Philippe of Belgium	Countess Mathilde d'Udekem d'Acoz	Princess Astrid of Belgium, Archduchess of Austria-Este	Prince Lorenz of Belgium, Archduke of Austria-Este	Prince Laurent of Belgium	Claire Louise Coombs

style="border-spacing: 2px; border: 1px solid darkgray;"

descent		adoption
marriage	1, 2	spouse order

== See also ==
- Famille Motier de La Fayette
- Bourbon-Busset
- Arnauld family
- House of La Trémoille
- Duke of Noailles
- Pineton de Chambrun
- Château de Chavaniac
- Château de la Grange-Bléneaug
- Château-Dauphin
- Château de Saint Romain
- Château de Chouvigny
- Château de Tournoël
- Saint George Palace
- Valmont Abbey
- Bishops of Limoges
- Jacques de Silly
- Bataille de Cognat
- American Friends of Lafayette
