= Vollore =

Vollore may refer to:

- Vollore-Montagne, a commune in the Puy-de-Dôme department of France
- Vollore-Ville, a commune in the Puy-de-Dôme department of France
- Château de Vollore, a castle in Vollore-Ville
