= Virginie de Pusy Lafayette =

French clubwoman

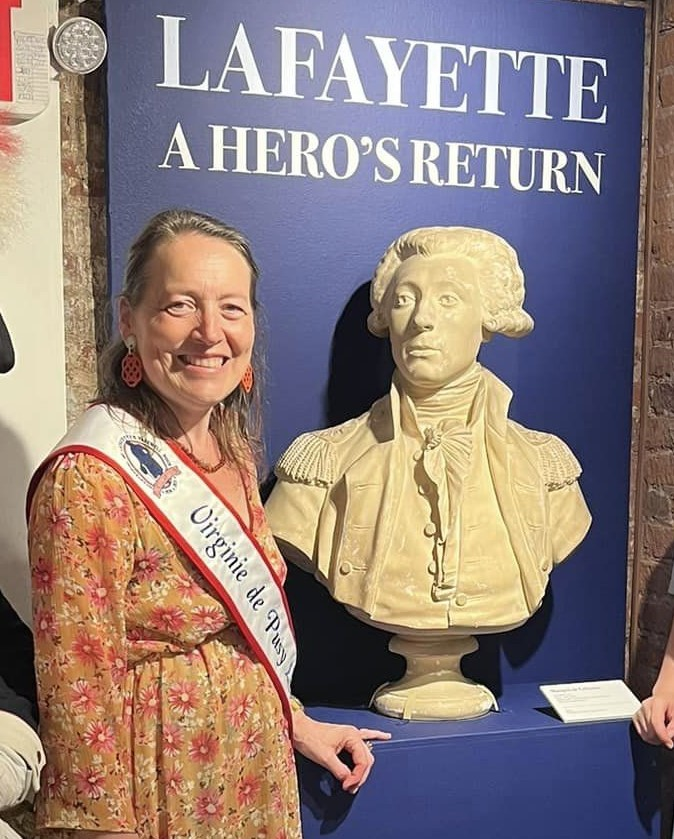
- Born: 29 August 1970 (age 56); Auvergne, France
- Spouse: Philippe Barbier
- Children: 6
- Relatives: House of Lafayette

Virginie Bureaux de Pusy-Dumottier de Lafayette, also known as Virginie Aubert La Fayette Barbier, (born 29 August 1970) is a French aristocrat and clubwoman. As a direct descendant of the Marquis de La Fayette, she served as the official ambassador of the American Friends of Lafayette's La Fayette Bicentennial from 2024 to 2025.

== Early life and family ==
De Pusy Lafayette was born near the Chaîne des Puys in France's Auvergne-Rhône-Alpes region, and has historical family ties there. She is a seventh-generation direct descendant of Gilbert du Motier, Marquis de Lafayette, a French nobleman and military officer who volunteered with the Continental Army during the American Revolutionary War. She grew up in Auvergne and her childhood home, the Château de Vollore, had a room of Lafayette memorabilia that was dedicated in 1976 by American ambassador Kenneth Rush. As a teenager, she served as a tour guide for visitors at her family's home.

== Clubs and societies ==
De Pusy Lafayette is a member of multiple civic and lineage societies including the American Friends of Lafayette, the Southern Dames of America, the Ordre de Lafayette Auvergne, and the Rochambeau Chapter of the Daughters of the American Revolution. She currently serves as the Rochambeau Chapter NSDAR's registrar.

=== Lafayette Bicentennial ===
De Pusy Lafayette was selected as an ambassador for The 200th Bicentennial of Lafayette's 1824-1825 Farewell Tour in August 2024 in the United States, becoming the first female descendant of the Marquis de Lafayette to be honored. De Pusy Lafayette and two of her daughters, Héloïse and Adélaïde Barbier-Dumottier de Lafayette, kicked off the tour at a celebration in New York City, attending an official dinner on Staten Island. They continued on, in the footsteps of their ancestor, to Connecticut, Rhode Island and Massachusetts.

As part of the tour, she also visited the Tomb of George Washington at Mount Vernon on 12 August 2024, where she met with a descendant of James Armistead Lafayette.

In April 2025, De Pusy Lafayette joined the French National Orchestra Auvergne-Rhône-Alpes as ambassador on The Lafayette Musical & Immersive Bicentennial Tour. The tour included performances in New Orleans, Charleston, Nashville and Washington D.C., and an official visit to The Huguenot Society of America in Charleston, South Carolina. She completed the tour at Lafayette College, meeting with the college's president Nicole Hurd and attending the final orchestra performance at Williams Center for the Arts.

== Personal life ==
De Pusy Lafayette is married to Philippe Barbier. They have six children: Héloïse, Adélaïde, Marguerite, Augustin, Enguerrand, and Godefroy. She lives in La Manche region of Normandy.
