= Château de Saint Romain =

Ruined castle in Haute-Loire, France

Coordinates: 45.0876°N 3.6335°E

The Château de Saint Romain is a ruined castle in the commune of Siaugues-Sainte-Marie (previously in the former commune of Siaugues-Saint-Romain and hence the name) in the Haute-Loire département of France.

The fief was known in the 13th century as being held by the brother of Saint-Louis IX of France, Alphonse de Poitiers. The castle was protected by an external enceinte of which only terraces and two towers at the entry gate remain. Of the inner castle, there are still the keep, a tower and part of a staircase tower which served the residence which was attached to the keep. There are remains of paintings on the second of the keep's four floors. Most of the fortress was constructed in the 14th century.

The castle overlooks Siaugues and was intended to repel Angevin forces based to the west on the opposite side of the river Allier. The castle changed hands several times, coming into the possession of the La Fayette family in c.1400 under Gilbert Motier de La Fayette. It remained in the family until the French Revolution when it was taken by the commune and used as a quarry. Some preservation work has begun.

The castle is privately owned. It has been listed since 1984 as a monument historique by the French Ministry of Culture.

== See also ==
- List of castles in France
