= Philibert-Joseph Le Roux =

Philibert-Joseph Le Roux (? – before 1735 Brussels) was an 18th-century French lexicographer.

Le Roux is remembered for his Dictionaire comique, satyrique, critique, burlesque, libre & proverbial published in 1718. Le Roux was forced to leave France in 1693 after he published a pamphlet against François de la Chaise. He fled to Brussels where he died before 1735 while serving Marie-Elisabeth of Austria.

== Works ==
- Histoire du père La Chaize, jésuite et confesseur du roi Louis XIV où l'on verra les intrigues secrettes qu'il a eues à la cour de France et dans toutes les cours de l'Europe pour l'avancement des grands desseins du roi son maître, Köln 1693;
- Dictionaire comique, satyrique, critique, burlesque, libre et proverbial, Amsterdam 1718 (540 pages), Lyon 1735 (668 pages), 1739, Amsterdam 1750, Lyon 1752, 2 Bde., Pampelune 1786 (612 + 606 pages, Paris 1793; suspected editor: François Lacombe), Amsterdam 1787. The Nouveau dictionnaire proverbial, satirique et burlesque, plus complet que ceux qui ont paru jusqu'a ce jour, a l'usage de tout le monde by Antoine Caillot (Paris 1826, 1829) was little more than a copy of Le Roux's dictionary.
- Les annales du monde ou l'histoire universelle sacrée, ecclésiastique & profane, completed by chevalier Lenglet de Percel, Brüssel 1732–1735

== Bibliography ==
- Franz Josef Hausmann, 120. Das Wörterbuch der Sprechsprache, des Argot und des Slang, in: Wörterbücher. Dictionaries. Dictionnaires. Ein internationales Handbuch zur Lexikographie. Zweiter Teilband, hrsg. von Franz Josef Hausmann, Oskar Reichmann, Herbert Ernst Wiegand und Ladislav Zgusta, Berlin. New York 1990, (p. 1184–1190)
- Laurent Bray, Essai de filiation d’un dictionnaire de français non conventionnel du 18e siècle: Le Roux (1718, 1735), in: Grammaire des fautes et français non conventionnels, Paris 1992, (p. 185–196)
