= Siaugues-Sainte-Marie =

- Commune
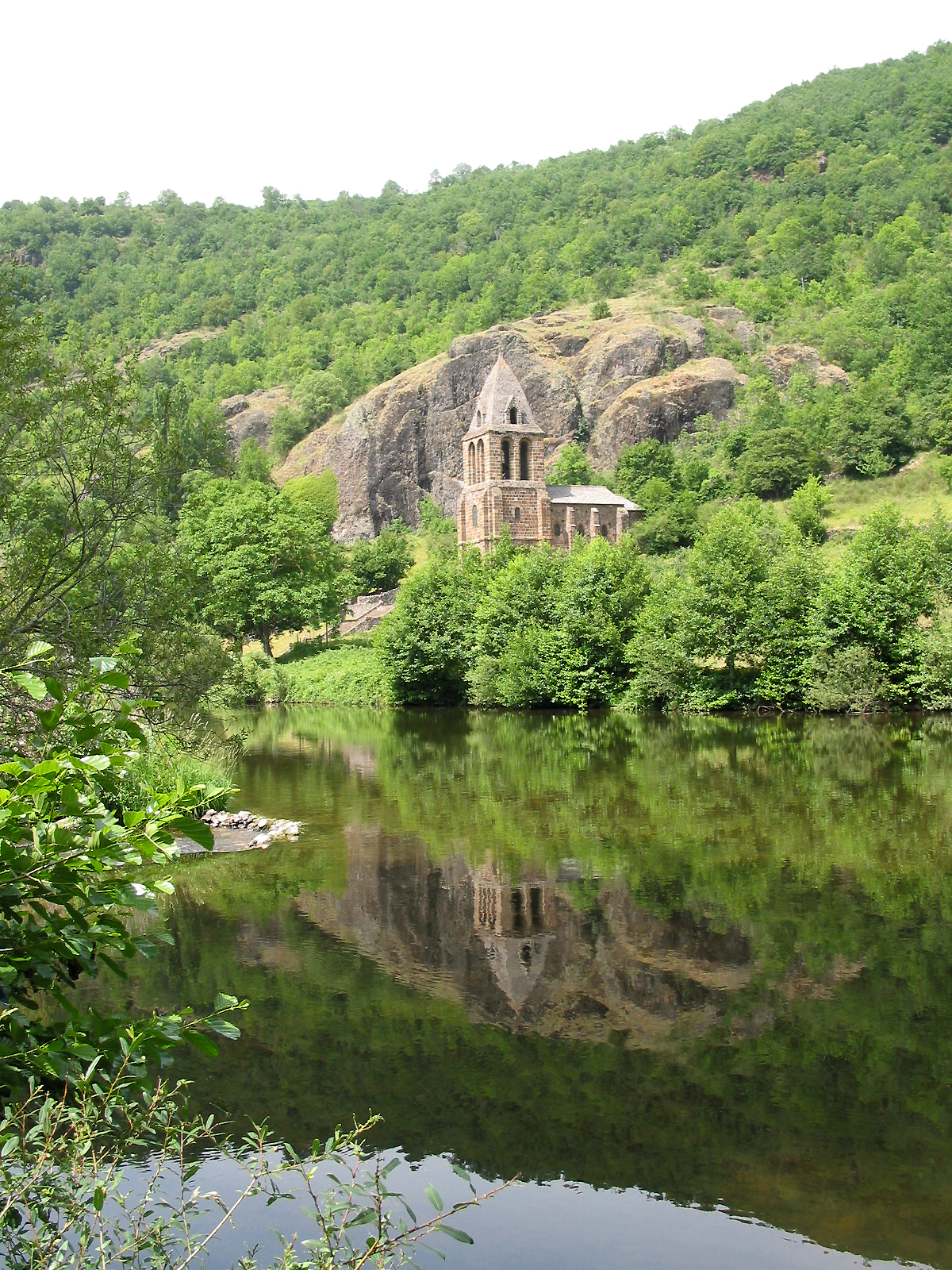
- Chapel of Sainte-Marie-des-Chazes
- Location of Siaugues-Sainte-Marie
- Location within France Location within Auvergne-Rhône-Alpes
- Coordinates: 45°05′41″N 3°38′00″E
- Country: France
- Region: Auvergne-Rhône-Alpes
- Department: Haute-Loire
- Arrondissement: Brioude
- Canton: Gorges de l'Allier-Gévaudan

Government
  - Mayor (2020–2026): Gilles Ruat
- Area^{1}: 40.01 km^{2} (15.45 sq mi)
- Elevation: 910 m (2,990 ft)
- Highest elevation: 1,301 m (4,268 ft)
- Lowest elevation: 540 m (1,770 ft)
- Population (2023): 839
  - Density: 21.0/km^{2} (54.3/sq mi)
- Time zone: UTC+01:00 (CET)
  - Summer (DST): UTC+02:00 (CEST)
- INSEE/Postal code: 43239 /43300
- ^{1} French Land Register data, which excludes lakes, ponds, glaciers > 1 km^{2} (0.386 sq mi or 247 acres) and river estuaries.

Siaugues-Sainte-Marie (French pronunciation: [sjoɡ sɛ̃t maʁi]) is a commune in the Haute-Loire département in south-central France.

== Population ==
Historical population
Year	Pop.	±% p.a.
1968	1,099	—
1975	1,012	−1.17%
1982	954	−0.84%
1990	832	−1.70%
1999	798	−0.46%
2007	796	−0.03%
2012	792	−0.10%
2017	799	+0.18%
2023	839	+0.82%
Source: INSEE

== Château de Saint Romain ==
Siaugues is overlooked by the ruined towers of a castle established in the 13th century by Saint Louis IX to repel Angevin forces based to the west on the opposite side of the river Allier.

The castle changed hands several times, coming into the possession of the La Fayette family in c.1400 under Gilbert Motier de La Fayette. It remained in the family until the French Revolution when it was taken by the commune and used as a quarry. The castle then passed into private ownership and some preservation work has begun.

== Personalities ==
- Maurice Fombeure, poet
