= Michel du Motier, Marquis de La Fayette =

French noble and military officer (1731–1759)

Michel du Motier
- Marquis de La Fayette
- Born: Michel Louis Christophe Roch Gilbert Motier; 13 August 1731; Kingdom of France
- Died: 9 July 1759 (aged 27); Minden, Minden-Ravensberg, Prussia
- Spouse: Marie Louise Jolie de la Rivière (m. 1754)
- Issue: Gilbert du Motier
- Father: Edouard du Motier, marquis de Vissac
- Mother: Marie Catherine de Suat, dame de Chavaniac

Michel Louis Christophe Roch Gilbert Motier, Marquis de La Fayette (13 August 1731 – 9 July 1759) was a colonel in the French Grenadiers.

== Early life ==
Michel Louis Christophe Roch Gilbert was the son of Edouard Motier de La Fayette, the Lord of Champetières and Marquis de Vissac (1669–1740), and Marie Catherine de Suat, dame de Chavaniac (1690–1772).

The marquis title and Lord of Chavaniac passed to him from his elder brother, Jacques-Roch du Motier (1711–1734), upon his death on January 18, 1734 while fighting the Austrians at Milan in the War of Polish Succession.

== Career ==
The Marquis de La Fayette was a colonel in the French Grenadiers and was a Knight of the Order of Saint Louis. On 9 July 1759, he was killed by a cannonball at the Battle of Minden during the Seven Years' War.

== Personal life ==
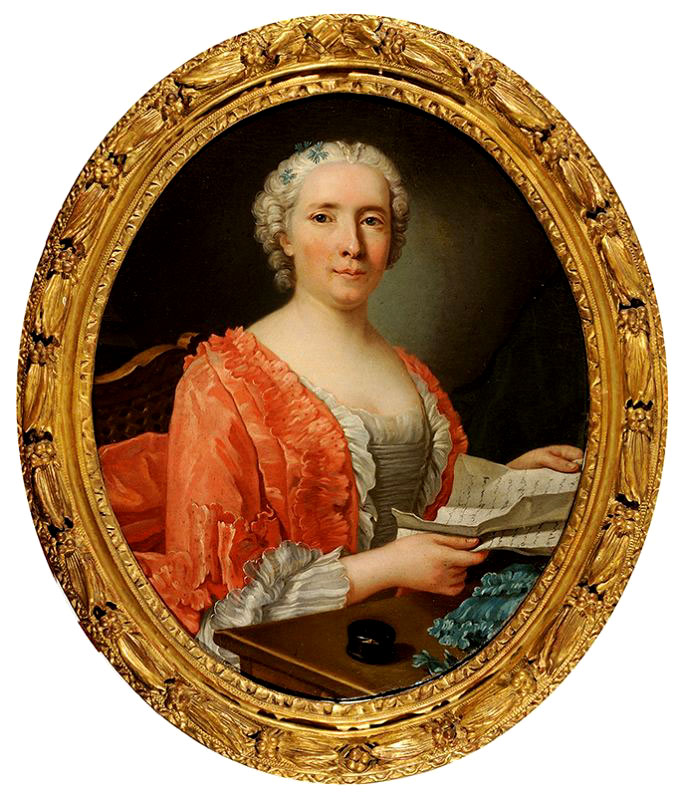
The marquis' wife, Marie Louise Jolie de la Rivière

On 22 May 1754, he married Marie Louise Jolie de la Rivière (1737–1770), the daughter of the Marquis de la Rivière, a rich nobleman from Brittany. She was a heiress of an ancient line of powerful nobles with vast estates and her family had ties to the "noblesse de la robe", the royal family's inner circle of courtiers. Her maternal grandfather was the Comte de La Rivière, until his death in 1770 commander of the Mousquetaires du Roi, or Black Musketeers, King Louis XV's personal horse guard. Together, they were the parents of a son who was born at the château de Chavaniac, in Chavaniac-Lafayette, near Le Puy-en-Velay, in the province of Auvergne (now Haute-Loire): (Note: His full name is rarely used; instead he is often referred to as the marquis de La Fayette or Lafayette (in the United States, not in France where a two words spelling is official). Biographer Louis R. Gottschalk says that Lafayette spelled his name both Lafayette and La Fayette. Other historians differ on the spelling of Lafayette's name: Lafayette, La Fayette, and LaFayette. Contemporaries often used "La Fayette", similar to his ancestor, the novelist Madame de La Fayette; however, his immediate family wrote Lafayette. See Gottschalk, pp. 153–54.)

- Gilbert du Motier, Marquis de Lafayette (1757–1834), who played a significant role in the American and French Revolutions.

The death of his father has been argued to be a factor in Gilbert du Motier's decision to fight against the British in the American Revolutionary War. Only two years old when his father died, Gilbert du Motier became marquis and Lord of Chavaniac, but the estate went to his mother. Perhaps devastated by the loss of her husband, she went to live in Paris with her father and grandfather, leaving their son to be raised in Chavaniac-Lafayette by his paternal grandmother, Mme de Chavaniac, who had brought the château into the family with her dowry. His widow and her father died in 1770, leaving Michel's 12-year-old son orphaned.
