= Château de Chouvigny =

Castle at Chouvigny, Allier, France

Coordinates: 46°7′29″N 2°59′38″E

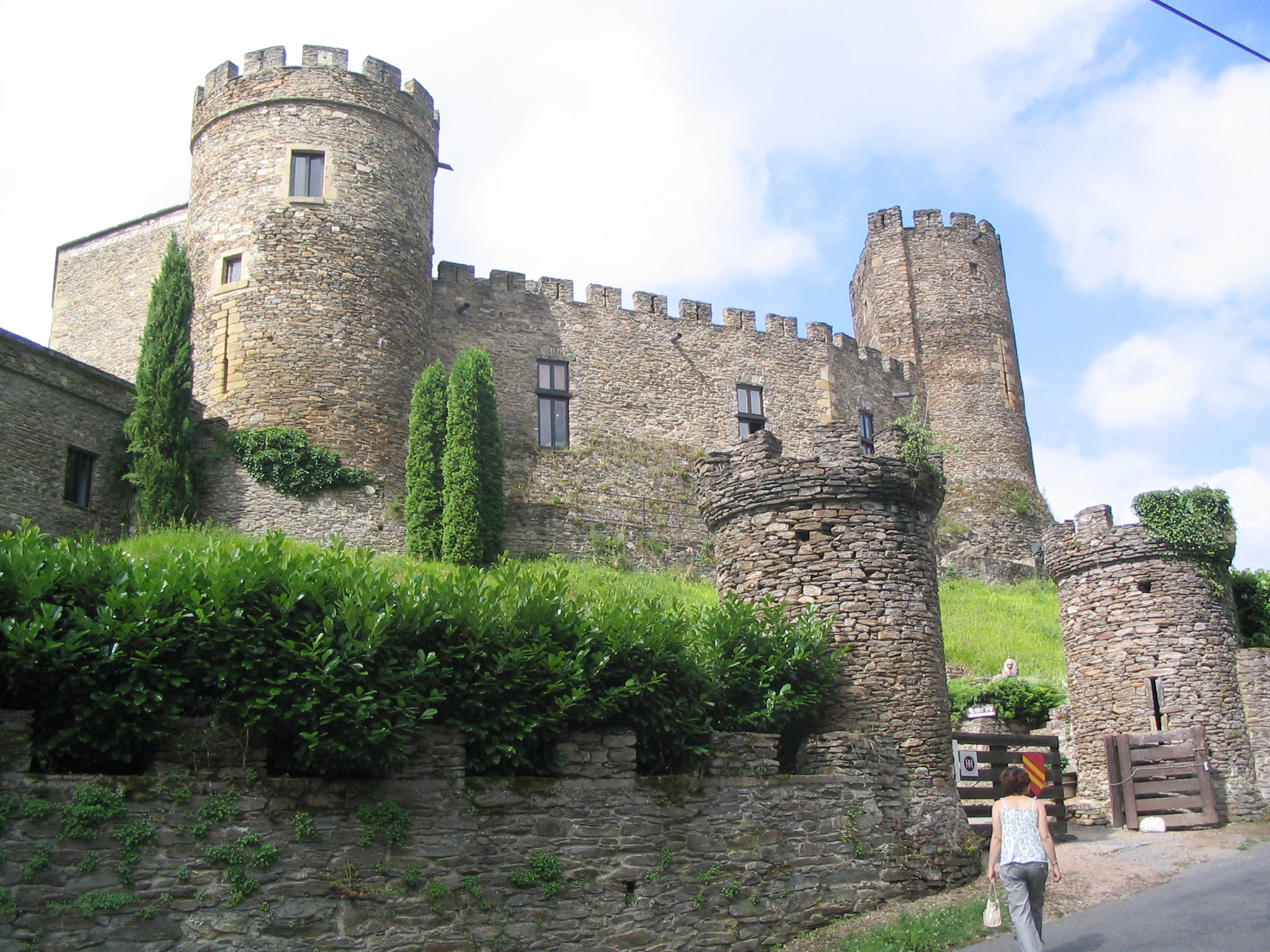

Château de Chouvigny is a castle at Chouvigny in the Sioule valley in the Allier département of France.

== Location ==
The castle dominates the valley of the Sioule, at a spot where the gorges, called the gorges de Chouvigny, enlarge. It is approximately 300 metres south east of the town of Chouvigny. The road which climbs from the Sioule towards the town passes behind the castle and serves as its entrance.

== History ==
The castle is the cradle of the Chauvigny family which by marriage in the 13th century became Chauvigny de Blot. At the start of the 15th century, the castle passed by marriage to the Montmorin family, then, with the marriage in 1543 of Françoise de Montmorin and Jean Motier de La Fayette, lord of Hautefeuille, to the family of La Fayette. In the 17th century, it belonged to the great-grandson of Jean, François de La Fayette; his wife, Madame de La Fayette, stayed there.

Under the Second Empire, Chouvigny belonged to the duc de Morny.

The castle is privately owned. Unusually, for such a structure, it is not listed as a monument historique by the French Ministry of Culture.

== See also ==
- List of castles in France

== Sources ==
- Val de Sioule website: Château de Chouvigny

== Bibliography ==
- René Germain (dir.), Dominique Laurent, Maurice Piboule, Annie Regond et Michel Thévenet, Châteaux, fiefs, mottes, maisons fortes et manoirs en Bourbonnais, Éd. de Borée, 2004, 684 p. (ISBN 2-84494-199-0), p. 306-307.
