= Antoine Caillot =

French writer (1759–1839)

Antoine Caillot (29 December 1759, in Lyon – c. 1839) was a French man of letters.

Caillot was identified as a priest and a confessor to prominent French noblewomen. When the ecclesiastical oath was repealed, he left priesthood, married, was arrested during the reign of Terror and escaped death, so they say, by a confusion of names.

He was a teacher, bookseller and freemason. He published numerous books, mostly historical, moral or religious compilations as well as pamphlets, sometimes published under the pseudonyms "Gaspard l'Avisé" or "Abbé petit-maître". During the riots leading to the French Revolution, he recorded accounts involving socio-political developments. He noted, for instance, that women were not spared in the "political contagion". His works also covered etiquette and social norms. The following dictum is attributed to the author: "it is important then, in order to respond to the demands of nature and of society, to contract the habit of domestic work at a young age". This came with an explanation that its absence will lead to a lazy and untrained daughter.

The Nouveau dictionnaire proverbial, satirique et burlesque, plus complet que ceux qui ont paru jusqu'a ce jour, a l'usage de tout le monde which he published in 1826 was little more than a copy of the Dictionaire comique, satyrique, critique, burlesque, libre & proverbial by Philibert-Joseph Le Roux.
