= Walter P. Gardner =

American judge

Judge of the New Jersey Court of Errors and Appeals

Personal details
- Died: 1949
- Occupation: Lawyer

Walter P. Gardner (died 1949) was an American judge. He served on the New Jersey Court of Errors and Appeals and was a trustee of the Central Railroad of New Jersey. Gardner was a co-founder of the American Friends of Lafayette.

== Career ==
Gardner served as a judge on the New Jersey Court of Errors and Appeals. He served as a court-appointed trustee of the Central Railroad of New Jersey. He was appointed to the board of trustees of the railroad on October 30, 1939.

== Personal life and death ==
Gardner was a collector of historical documents and artifacts related to the Marquis de Lafayette and, together with Stuart Wells Jackson, he co-founded the American Friends of Lafayette in 1932.

He died in 1949.
