= François de la Chaise =

Confessor of King Louis XIV of France (1624–1709)

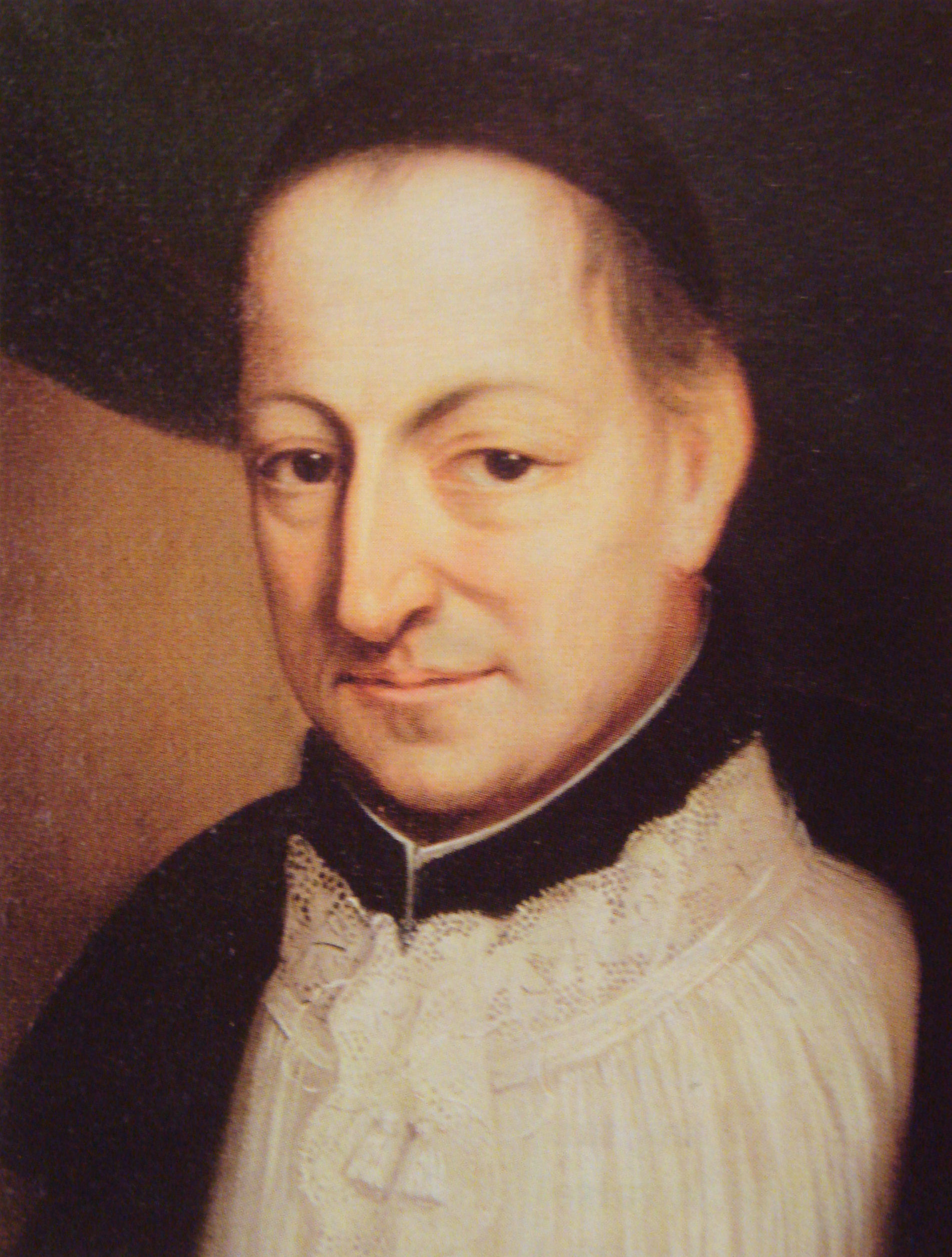
Père Lachaise

François de la Chaise (French pronunciation: [fʁɑ̃swa d(ə) la ʃɛːz]; 25 August 1624 – 20 January 1709), also known as Père Lachaise (Father Lachaise), was a French Jesuit priest, the father confessor of King Louis XIV of France.

== Biography ==
François de la Chaise was born at the Château of Aix in Aix-la-Fayette, Puy-de-Dôme, Auvergne, being the son of Georges d'Aix, seigneur de La Chaise, and of Renée de Rochefort.

On his mother's side he was a grandnephew of Pierre Coton, the confessor of Henry IV. He became a novice of the Society of Jesus before completing his studies at Lyon, where, after taking final vows, he lectured on philosophy to students attracted by his fame from all parts of France.

Through the influence of Camille de Villeroy, Archbishop of Lyon, Père de la Chaise was in 1674 nominated confessor of Louis XIV, who entrusted him during the lifetime of Harlay de Champvallon, archbishop of Paris, with the administration of the ecclesiastical patronage of the crown. The confessor united his influence with that of Madame de Maintenon to induce the king to abandon his liaison with Madame de Montespan. More than once at Easter he is said to have had a convenient illness which dispensed him from granting absolution to Louis XIV.

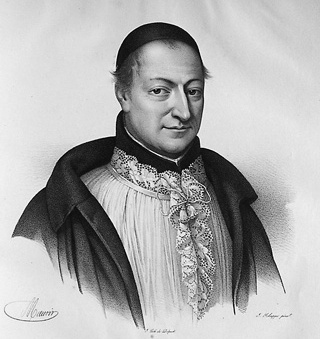
François de La Chaise (1624–1709)

With the fall of Madame de Montespan and the ascendancy of Madame de Maintenon his influence vastly increased. The marriage between Louis XIV and Madame de Maintenon was celebrated in his presence at Versailles, but there is no reason for supposing that the subsequent coolness between him and Madame de Maintenon arose from his insistence on secrecy in this matter. During the long strife over the temporalities of the Gallican Church between Louis XIV and Innocent XI, Père de la Chaise supported the royal prerogative, though he used his influence at Rome to conciliate the papal authorities. He was largely responsible for the revocation of the Edict of Nantes.

He exercised a moderating influence on Louis XIV's zeal against the Jansenists, and Saint-Simon, who were opposed to him in most matters, which does full justice to his humane and honourable character.

Père de la Chaise had a lasting affection for Archbishop Fénelon, which remained unchanged by the papal condemnation of the Maximes.

In spite of failing faculties, he continued his duties as confessor to Louis XIV to the end of his long life.

== Legacy ==
The name of Father de la Chaise became attached to the Jesuit house where he lived, at the time outside the boundaries of Paris – and to the plot of land near that house. In 1804, Napoleon established a cemetery there, the well-known Père Lachaise Cemetery (literally "The Father la Chaise Cemetery").

William Hurt portrayed Father de la Chaise in the fantasy-adventure film The King's Daughter (2022).
