= Château de Vollore =

Castle in Puy-de-Dôme, France

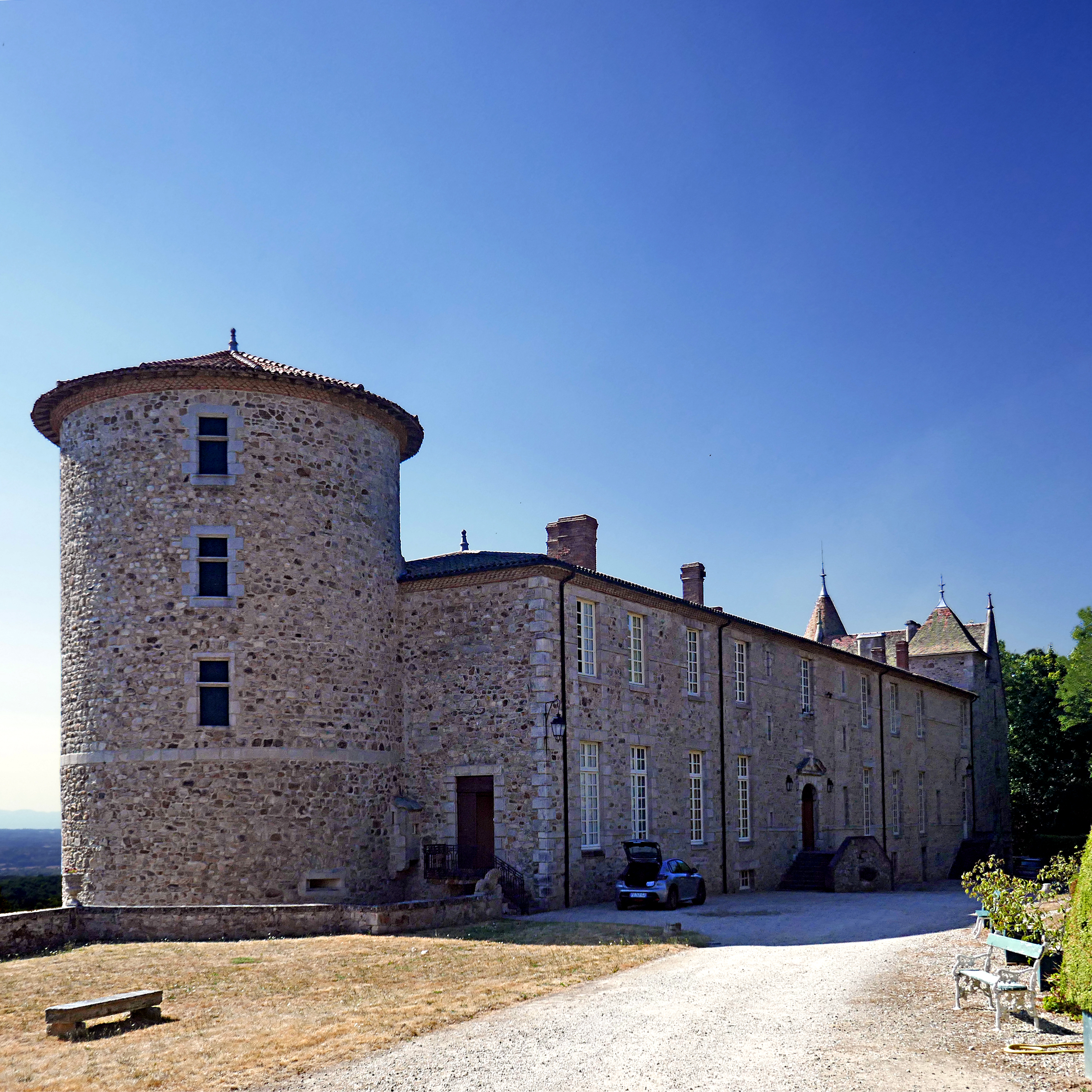
- The Château de Vollore in 2022

- Location within France
- 45°47′11″N 3°35′50″E
- Location: Rue du Château, 63120; Vollore-Ville, Puy-de-Dôme, Auvergne-Rhône-Alpes, France

Site notes
- Owner: Lafayette family
- Website: chateauvollore.com

Château de Vollore is a castle in the Puy-de-Dôme department of France.

== History ==
In 532, Vollore was besieged by Theuderic I. A Romanesque fortress was built by the Vollore family in the 12th century. The original keep remains part of the château. The château passed down through the Thiers, Chazeron, and Montmorin-Saint-Hérem families, the latter constructed the present building in the 17th century. It suffered a major fire in the sixteenth century and, shortly after the French Revolution, the towers were demolished. Since the 19th century, the property has belonged to members of the Motier de la Fayette family, descendants of Gilbert du Motier, Marquis de La Fayette. In the 20th century, the family hosted musical salons featuring performances by the pianist Laurent Martin.

The château was modernized and underwent renovations by the architect René Moreau. It was opened to the public in the 1970s and has operated as a bed and breakfast since 1997. It houses personal artifacts of the Marquis de La Fayette and memorabilia from the American Revolutionary War. The historic collection was dedicated in 1976 by American ambassador Kenneth Rush. The château is currently owned by François-Xavier Aubert La Fayette.
