= René Moreau =

French scientist

René Moreau (born in 1938 in Autun) is a French scientist and professor emeritus at the Institut national polytechnique de Grenoble (INPG). He is a member of the French Academy of Sciences.

== Biography ==
René Moreau is Professor Emeritus at Grenoble-INP, where he directed the ENSHMG from 1982 to 1987 and where he taught fluid mechanics at all levels. His research has focused on the magneto-hydrodynamics (MHD) of liquid metals, including turbulence that tends to become two-dimensional in the presence of a relatively strong magnetic field, as well as various applications of MHD in metallurgical processes. He has also participated in the understanding of instability phenomena in insulating liquids subjected to an electric field. He was the founder of the MADYLAM Scientific Interest Group, for "MAgnétoDYnamique des Liquides, Applications à la Métallurgie", which became the EPM group (for Elaboration par Procédés Magnétiques) of the Laboratoire Science et Ingénierie des Matériaux et des Procédés (SIMaP). He has been a member of the French Academy of Sciences since 1993 and a member of the Academy of Technology since 2000. He is the author of numerous publications, a monograph "Magnetohydrodynamics" (Springer, 1990) and a popular science book Air and Water (EDP Sciences, 2013). He was the founding editor of the Springer Fluid Mechanics and Its Applications collection. He is now one of the editors of the Encyclopedia of the Environment, an open access website that went online in October 2016.

== Fields of scientific activity ==
His main contributions concern the magneto-hydrodynamics (MHD) of liquid metals, a field in which he has supervised more than 40 doctoral students, many of whom have now become his colleagues, in France or abroad. In this vast scientific field, he focused his attention on MHD turbulence, MHD convection, Hartmann layers, Alfven waves in liquid metals and applications in metallurgy.

At the University of Grenoble, in 1978 he founded the MADYLAM laboratory (for: "MAgnétoDYnamique des Liquides. Applications to Metallurgy"), whose current name is EPM (for "Electromagnetic Processes of Materials"). He has published more than 100 articles in leading scientific journals and a book (Magnetohydrodynamics, Kluwer Acad. Pub. 1990). A list of his most recent publications is given below.

He was the founder of the international association "HYDROMAG", of which he was the first President (1995-2000). He is the scientific editor of the "Fluid Mechanics and Its Applications" monograph series published by Springer, and has been editor, or associate editor, of several major scientific journals (J. de Mécanique, European J. of Mechanics: B/Fluids, CRAS).

== Main publications ==
=== Books ===
1989, J. Lielpeteris and R. Moreau, Liquid Metal Magnetohydrodynamics, Kluwer Acad, Pub.

1990 R. Moreau; Magnetohydrodynamics, kluwer Acad.

2007 S. Molokov, R. Moreau and H.K. Moffatt, "Magnetohydrodynamics: Historical Evolution and Trends", Springer, in series Fluid Mechanics and Its Applications (series editor: R. Moreau).

2013. R. Moreau, "L'air et l'eau : Alizés, cyclones, Gulf Stream, tsunamis and many other natural curiosities", EDP Sciences, Grenoble sciences collection, translated into English, Romanian and Chinese

2016-. Jacques Joyard, René Moreau and Joël Sommeria. Environmental Encyclopedia.

=== Publications ===
1. Moreau R. and Hunt J. C. C. R., Liquid Metal Magnetohydrodynamics with Strong Magnetic Fields, J. Fluid Mech., vol. 78, p. 261-288, 1976

2. Sommeria J. and Moreau R., Why, how and when MHD turbulence becomes two-dimensional, J. Fluid Mech. 118, p. 365-377, 1982

3. Moreau R. and Evans J. W., An analysis of the Aluminium Reduction Cells, J. Electrochemical Soc., vol. 131, p. 2251-2259, 1984

4. Alboussière Th., Garandet J. P. and Moreau R., Buoyancy-driven convection wityh a uniform magnetic field, Part 1 : Asymptotic analysis (Ha>>1), J. Fluid Mech. 253, p. 545-563, 1993

5. Messadek K., Moreau R., An experimental investigation of MHD quasi-2D turbulent shear flows, J. Fluid Mech., 456, 137–159, 2002

6. Pothérat A., Sommeria J., Moreau R., Effective boundary conditions for magnetohydrodynamic flows with thin Hartmann layers, Phys. Fluids, 14, 1, 403–410, 2002

7. Pothérat A., Sommeria J. and Moreau R., Numerical simulation of an effective two-dimensional model for flows with a transverse magnetic field, J. Fluid Mech., Vol. 534, p. 115-143, 2005

8. Smolentsev S. and Moreau R., One-equation model for quasi-two-dimensional turbulent magnetohydrodynamic flows, Phys. Fluids, 19, 078101, 2007

9. Wang X., Moreau R., Fautrelle Y. and Etay J., A periodically reversed flow driven by a modulated traveling magnetic field. Part II: Theoretical model, Metallurgical and Material Transactions B, Volume 40B, p. 104-113, 2009

10. Moreau R, Bréchet Y. et Maniguet L., Eurofer corrosion par le flux de l'alliage eutectique Pb-Li en présence d'un champ magnétique fort, Fusion Eng. Des. (2010), doi :.10.1016/j.fusengdes. 2010.08.050

11. Smolentsev S., Vetcha N., et Moreau R., Study of instabilities and transitions for a family of quasi-two-dimensional magnetohydrodynamic flows based on a parametrical model, Physics of Fluids, 24, 024101, 2012

12. Vetcha N., Smolentsev S., Abdou M. et Moreau R., Study of instabilities and quasi-two-dimensional turbulence in volumetrically heated MHD flows in a vertical rectangular duct, Physics of Fluids 25, 024102, 2013.

13. Wang J. J., Zhang J., Ni M.-J., Ni M.-J. et Moreau R., Numerical study of single goutteplet impact onto liquid metal film under a uniform magnetic field, Physics of Fluids, 26, 122107, 2014.

14. Zhang J., Ni M.-J. et René Moreau, Rising motion of a single bubble through a liquid metal in the presence of a horizontal magnetic field, Physics of Fluids, 28, 032101; doi :10.1063/1.4942014, 2016

== Lessons learned ==
In Grenoble :

- Fluid mechanics, at various levels, from Bac+3 to Master (Bac+5)

- Thermal transfers, Bac+4 and Master levels

- Magnetohydrodynamics, Master level

At CISM (International Centre for Mechanical Sciences, Udine, Italy):

- Co-organizer and teacher in two international summer schools supported by IUTAM on Magnetohydrodynamics (MHD) and its applications,

== Distinctions ==
- Thesis Prize of the University of Grenoble (1968)
- CNRS Silver medal (1972)
- Boileau Prize of the French Academy of Sciences (1979)
- Commandeur of the Palmes Académiques (1999)
- Chevallier of the Ordre National du Mérite (2002)
- Chevallier of the Légion d'Honneur (2005)
