= American Friends of Lafayette =

Historical and patriotic organization

- Abbreviation: AFL
- Founded: May 20, 1932
- Founders: Stuart Wells Jackson; Walter P. Gardner
- Founded at: Lafayette College; Easton, Pennsylvania, U.S.
- Type: Non-profit, patriotic society
- Headquarters: 302 Hart Road; Gaithersburg, Maryland, U.S.
- Director: Chuck Schwam
- President: Alan Hoffman
- Publication: Gazette of the American Friends of Lafayette
- Website: friendsoflafayette.org

The American Friends of Lafayette (abbreviated as AFL) is a historical and patriotic society dedicated to France–United States relations, historic preservation, and recognition of Gilbert du Motier, Marquis de Lafayette and his contributions during the American Revolution.

== History ==
The American Friends of Lafayette was founded by Stuart Wells Jackson and Judge Walter P. Gardner on May 20, 1932 at Lafayette College in Easton, Pennsylvania, as a non-lineage historical society dedicated to preserving the memory of Gilbert du Motier, Marquis de Lafayette and to celebrate his life and work in both France and the United States. The organization made Lafayette College the official depository of almost 1,000 volumes and periodicals containing Lafayette articles, which are housed in the college library.

The organization's official publication, the Gazette of the American Friends of Lafayette, was first published in 1942 by Frank Monaghan.

In August 2023, the American Friends of Lafayette announced a 13-month-long bicentennial celebration of the Visit of the Marquis de Lafayette to the United States that took place between 1824 and 1825. The bicentennial tour, which included stops in all of the places Lafayette visited during his initial tour, began on August 16, 2024. Virginie de Pusy Lafayette, a seventh-great-granddaughter of the Marquis de Lafayette, was appointed as the ambassador for the 200th Bicentennial of Lafayette's 1824-1825 Farewell Tour, becoming the first woman descendant of Lafayette to do so. De Pusy Lafayette and two of her daughters kicked off the organization's celebration in New York City before taking the tour to Connecticut, Rhode Island, and Massachusetts.

To celebrate the United States Semiquincentennial and 250th anniversary of the Marquis de Lafayette's arrival in America, the organization announced they would be hosting events, beginning on June 13, 2027, 250 years after the Marquis landed on American soil in South Carolina. The commemoration, known as AFL250, will end with a historic commemoration in Yorktown, Virginia, on October 19, 2031, marking the 250th anniversary of the British surrender during the Siege of Yorktown.

== Notable members ==
- Paul Claudel (1868–1955), French diplomat and poet
- Walter E. Edge (1873–1956), American politician and diplomat
- Walter P. Gardner (died 1949), American judge
- Louis R. Gottschalk (1899–1975), American historian
- William Mather Lewis (1878–1945), American educator and politician
- Virginie de Pusy Lafayette (born 1970), French clubwoman and 7th-great-granddaughter of the Marquis de Lafayette
- Brand Whitlock (1869–1934), American politician, diplomat, and journalist
