= Vollore-Ville =

- Commune
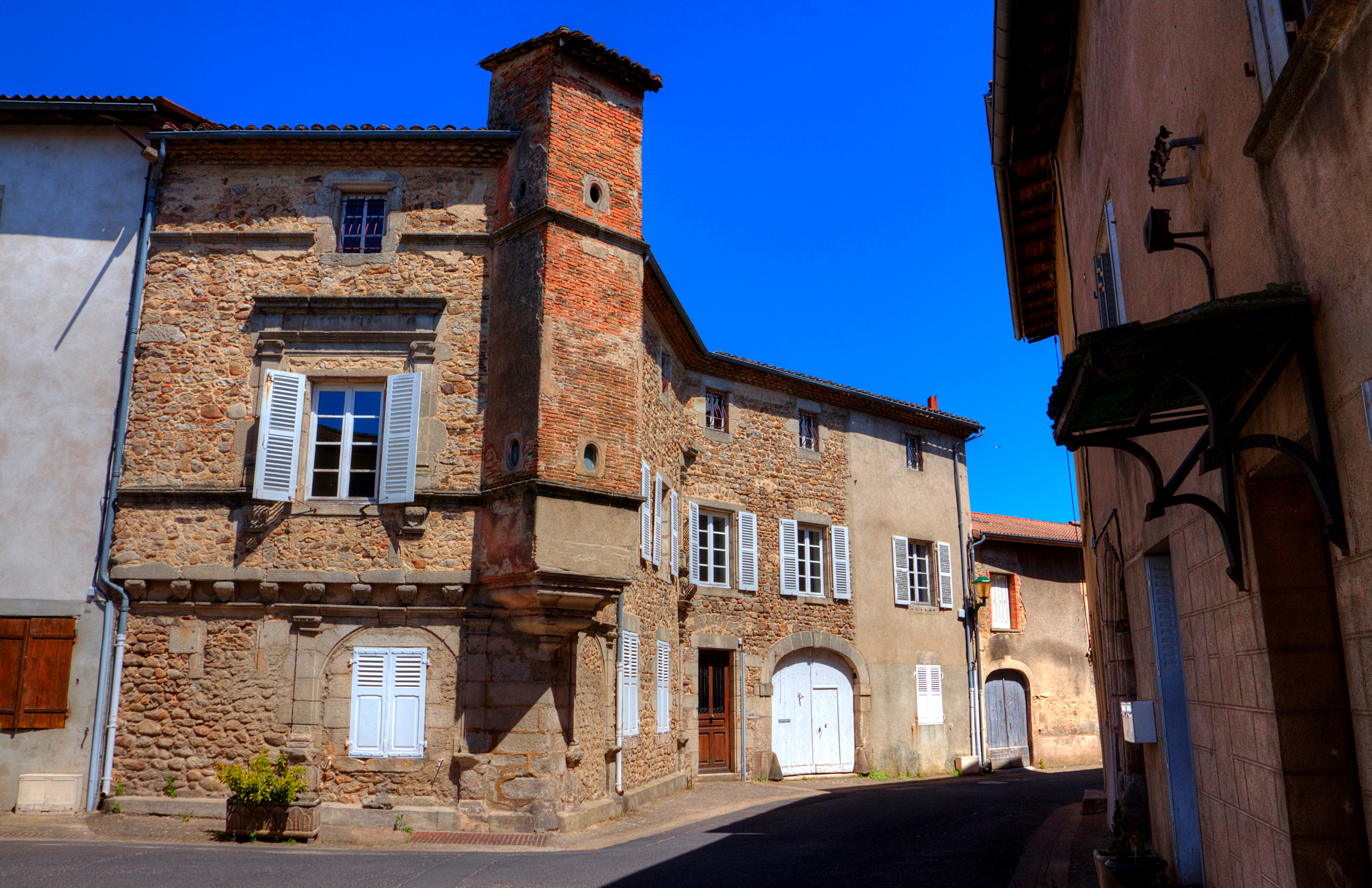
- The house in Vollore-Ville

- Coat of arms
- Location of Vollore-Ville
- Location within France Location within Auvergne-Rhône-Alpes
- Coordinates: 45°47′09″N 3°36′05″E
- Country: France
- Region: Auvergne-Rhône-Alpes
- Department: Puy-de-Dôme
- Arrondissement: Thiers
- Canton: Les Monts du Livradois
- Intercommunality: Thiers Dore et Montagne

Government
  - Mayor (2026–32): Olivier Levigne
- Area^{1}: 30.41 km^{2} (11.74 sq mi)
- Elevation: 850 m (2,790 ft)
- Highest elevation: 1,062 m (3,484 ft)
- Lowest elevation: 316 m (1,037 ft)
- Population (2023): 718
  - Density: 23.6/km^{2} (61.2/sq mi)
- Time zone: UTC+01:00 (CET)
  - Summer (DST): UTC+02:00 (CEST)
- INSEE/Postal code: 63469 /63120
- ^{1} French Land Register data, which excludes lakes, ponds, glaciers > 1 km^{2} (0.386 sq mi or 247 acres) and river estuaries.

Vollore-Ville (French pronunciation: [vɔlɔʁ vil]; Auvergnat: Volort Vila) is a commune in the Puy-de-Dôme department in Auvergne in central France. The Château de Vollore is located in the commune.

== See also ==
- Communes of the Puy-de-Dôme department
