= Madame de La Fayette =

French writer (1634–1693)

Marie-Madeleine Pioche de La Vergne Comtesse de La Fayette
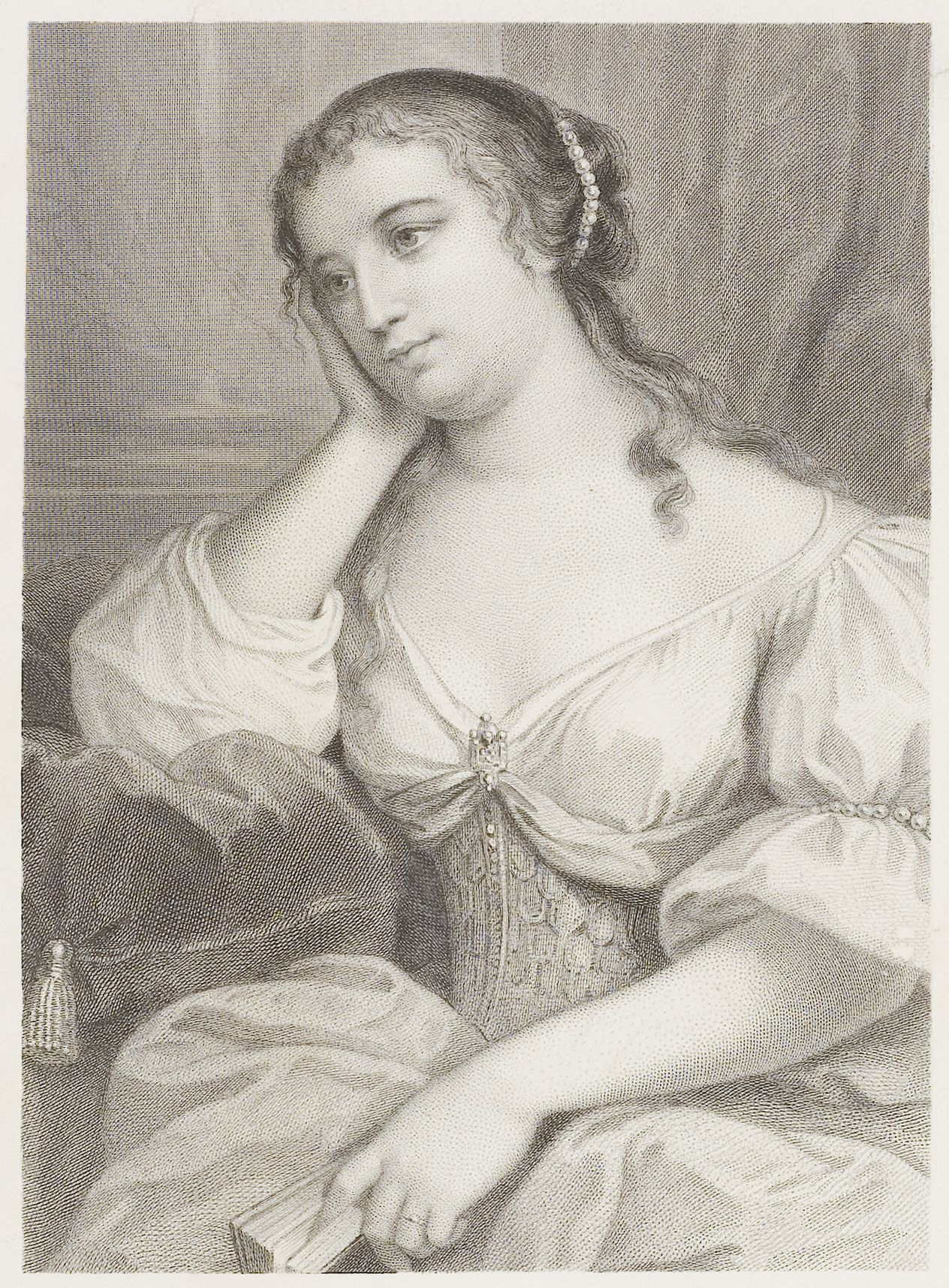
- Born: Marie-Madeleine Pioche de La Vergne; 18 March 1634; Paris, France
- Died: 25 May 1693 (aged 59); Paris, France
- Resting place: Église Saint-Sulpice, Paris
- Occupation: Novelist
- Spouse(s): François Motier, comte de La Fayette
- Children: René-Armand Motier de La Fayette; Louis Motier de La Fayette
- Writing career
- Pen name: Madame de La Fayette; Monsieur de Segrais
- Language: French
- Period: 17th century
- Notable work: La Princesse de Clèves
- Literary movement: Classicism, Précieuses

Marie-Madeleine Pioche de La Vergne, Comtesse de La Fayette (baptized 18 March 1634 – 25 May 1693), better known as Madame de La Fayette, was a French writer; she authored La Princesse de Clèves, France's first historical novel and one of the earliest novels in literature.

== Life ==
Christened Marie-Madeleine Pioche de La Vergne, she was born in Paris to a family of minor but wealthy nobility. At 16, de la Vergne became the maid of honour to Queen Anne of Austria and began also to acquire a literary education from Gilles Ménage, who gave her lessons in Italian and Latin. Ménage led her to join the fashionable salons of Madame de Rambouillet and Madeleine de Scudéry. Her father, Marc Pioche de la Vergne, had died a year before, and the same year her mother married Renaud de Sévigné, uncle of Madame de Sévigné, who remained her lifelong intimate friend.

In 1655, de la Vergne married François Motier, comte de La Fayette, a widowed nobleman some eighteen years her senior, with whom she had two sons. She accompanied him to country estates in Auvergne and Bourbonnais although she made frequent trips back to Paris, where she began to mix with court society and formed her own successful salon. Her sister-in-law was Louise de La Fayette (1618–1665), favourite of Louis XIII. Some of her acquaintances included Henrietta of England, future Duchess of Orleans, who asked La Fayette to write her biography; Antoine Arnauld; and the leading French writers Segrais and Huet. Earlier on, during the Fronde, La Fayette had also befriended the Cardinal de Retz with whom her stepfather was associated.

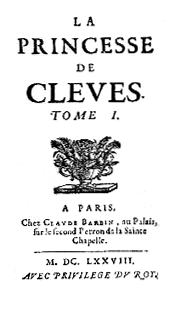
Marie de LaFayette's La Princesse de Clèves (1678)

Settling permanently in Paris in 1659, La Fayette published, anonymously, La Princesse de Montpensier in 1662. From 1665 onwards she formed a close relationship with François de La Rochefoucauld, author of Maximes, who introduced her to many literary luminaries of the time, including Racine and Boileau. 1669 saw the publication of the first volume of Zaïde, a Hispano-Moorish romance which was signed by Segrais but is almost certainly attributable to La Fayette. The second volume appeared in 1671. The title ran through reprints and translations mostly thanks to the preface Huet had offered.

La Fayette's most famous novel was La Princesse de Clèves, first published anonymously in March 1678. An immense success, the work is often taken to be the first true French novel and a prototype of the early psychological novel.

Her correspondence showed her as the acute diplomatic agent of Marie Jeanne Baptiste of Savoy-Nemours, duchess of Savoy, at the court of Louis XIV.

The death of La Rochefoucauld in 1680 and her husband in 1683 led La Fayette to lead a less active social life in her later years. Three works were published posthumously: La Comtesse de Tende (1718), Histoire d'Henriette d'Angleterre (1720), and Memoires de la Cour de France (1731).

== Family ==
Marie-Madeleine Pioche de La Vergne was the eldest daughter of Marc Pioche (–1649), Esquire to the King, Sieur de La Vergne and the tutor to Cardinal Richelieu's nephew, Jean Armand de Maille-Breze, and Isabella Pena (–1656) daughter of François Pena, physician of the King, and his wife, Michelle Coupe.

Her baptism took place March 18, 1634 in the Church of Saint-Sulpice. Her godfather was Urbain de Maillé-Brézé, Marshal of France, and her godmother was Marie-Madeleine de Vignerot, lady Combalet, later Duchess of Aiguillon, a niece of Richelieu.

Her marriage took place in the Church of Saint-Sulpice.

She is buried in the Church of Saint-Sulpice.

Marie-Madeleine had two younger sisters:

- Eléonore-Armande, baptized 1635
- Isabelle Louise, born 1636

Her mother, Isabella Pena, remarried in 1650 to René Renaud de Sévigné (–1656), uncle of the Marquise de Sévigné.

She married on February 15, 1655 François Motier, comte de La Fayette (brother of Louise de La Fayette) (1616–1683). He held several lands in the Auvergne region such as de La Fayette, de Goutenoutouse, de Médat and de Forest. They had two sons:

- Louis de Lafayette (1658–1729), baptized March 7, 1658, commendatory abbot of Notre-Dame de Valmont;
- Armand Renaud de La Fayette (1659–1694), Brigadier des armées, count and marquis de La Fayette.

After the birth of her two sons, her husband disappeared from her life so effectively that it was long supposed that he died about 1660.

== Works ==
- La Princesse de Montpensier, 1662, 2nd edition 1674 and 1675.
- Zaïde, histoire espagnole, vol. 1, vol 2, Paris, Claude Barbin, 1671.
- La Princesse de Clèves, Paris, Claude Barbin, 16 mai 1678 [anonymous]. (English translation 1689, London).
- Romans et Nouvelles, Paris, Classiques Garnier, 1989, ISSN 0750-2176.
- La Comtesse de Tende, 1718.
- Histoire de madame Henriette d'Angleterre, première femme de Philippe de France, Duc d'Orléans, Amsterdam, M.-C. Le Cène, 1720.
- Mémoires de la cour de France pour les années 1688 et 1689, Paris, Foucault, 1828.

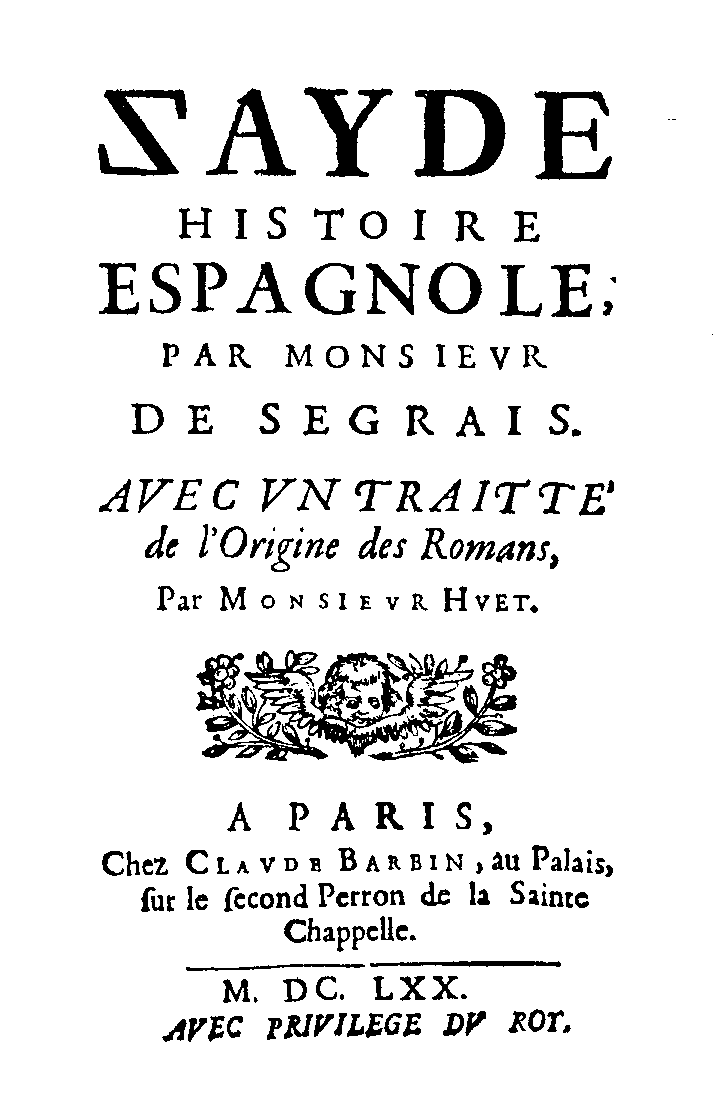
Marie de LaFayette's Zayde (1670)

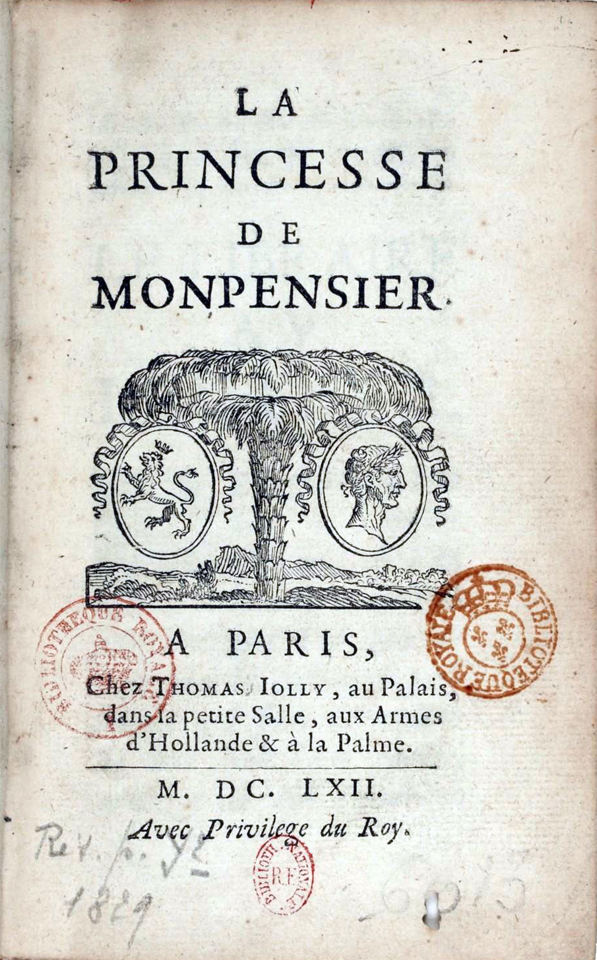
Marie de LaFayette's La Princess de Montpensier (1662)

== See also ==
- House of La Fayette
