= Louise de La Fayette =

French courtier

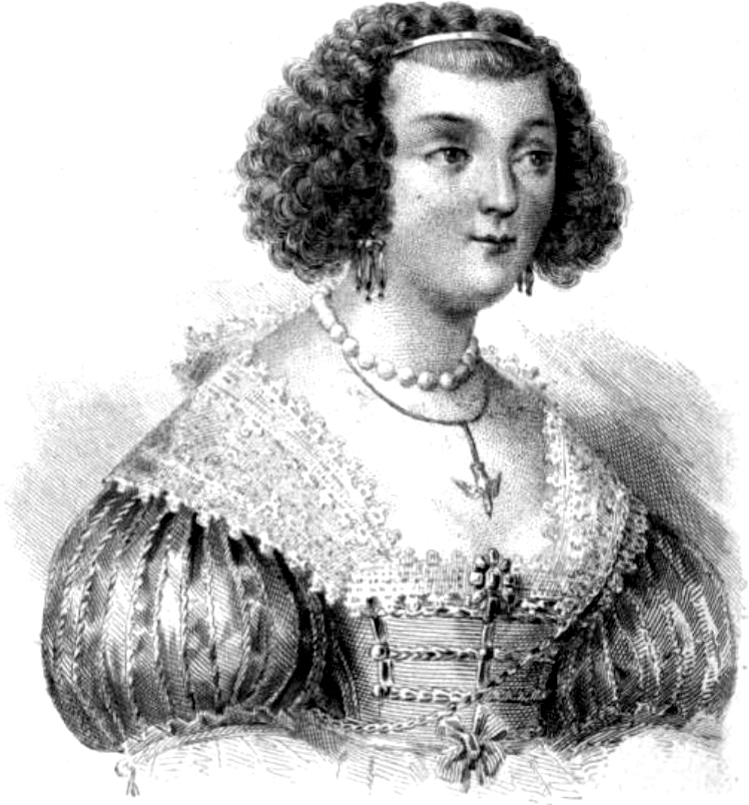
Louise de La Fayette

Louise Angélique Motier de la Fayette (8 November 1618 – 11 January 1665) was a French courtier and close friend and confidante of King Louis XIII. She later left the court and entered a convent. She was known for her influence upon the monarch both before and after she left the court.

== Life ==
Louise was one of the fourteen children of Jean comte de La Fayette, and Marguerite de Bourbon-Busset. She was born in Amathay-Vésigneux. Her mother was a member of House Bourbon-Busset an illegitimate branch of the royal House of Bourbon. Her sister-in-law was Madame de La Fayette (1634–1693) the author of La Princesse de Clèves, France's first historical novel and one of the earliest novels in literature.

=== Life in the royal court ===
Through her grandmother, Louise de Bourbon-Busset, she came to the French court to Paris, and became maid-of-honor to Anne of Austria. In 1635 Cardinal Richelieu sought to attract the attention of Louis XIII to her in the hope that she might counterbalance the influence exercised over him by Marie de Hautefort.

However, "[t]he hedonism and promiscuity of many courtiers repelled [Louis XIII] and attempts to provide him with a mistress failed lamentably." The affair did not turn out as the minister wished. The King was attracted to Louise because of her "innocence and purity", and he did indeed make her the confidante of his affairs. But when he divulged to her his resentment for the Cardinal, she, far from repeating Louis's confidences to the minister, set herself to encourage the King in his resistance to Richelieu's dominion.

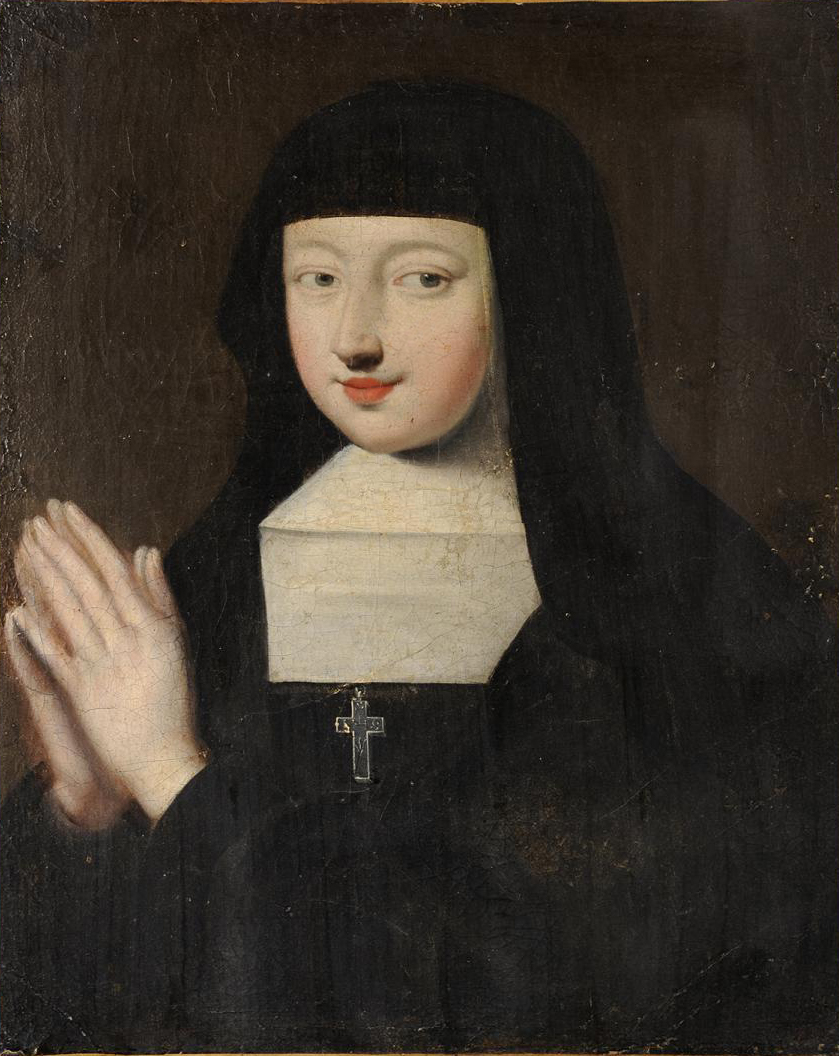
Sister Louise Angelique de La Fayette

She refused, nevertheless, to become Louis's mistress, and after taking leave of the King in Anne of Austria's presence, retired to the convent of the Order of the Visitation of Holy Mary in 1637.

=== Nun ===
As a Visitandine nun she was repeatedly visited by Louis, with whom she maintained a correspondence. Richelieu intercepted the letters, and by omissions and falsifications succeeded in destroying their mutual confidence. The cessation of their intercourse was regretted by the queen, who had been reconciled with her husband through the influence of Louise. At the time of her death in January 1665, Mlle de La Fayette was superior of a convent of her order which she had founded in 1651 with Henrietta Maria widow of Charles I of England at Chaillot.

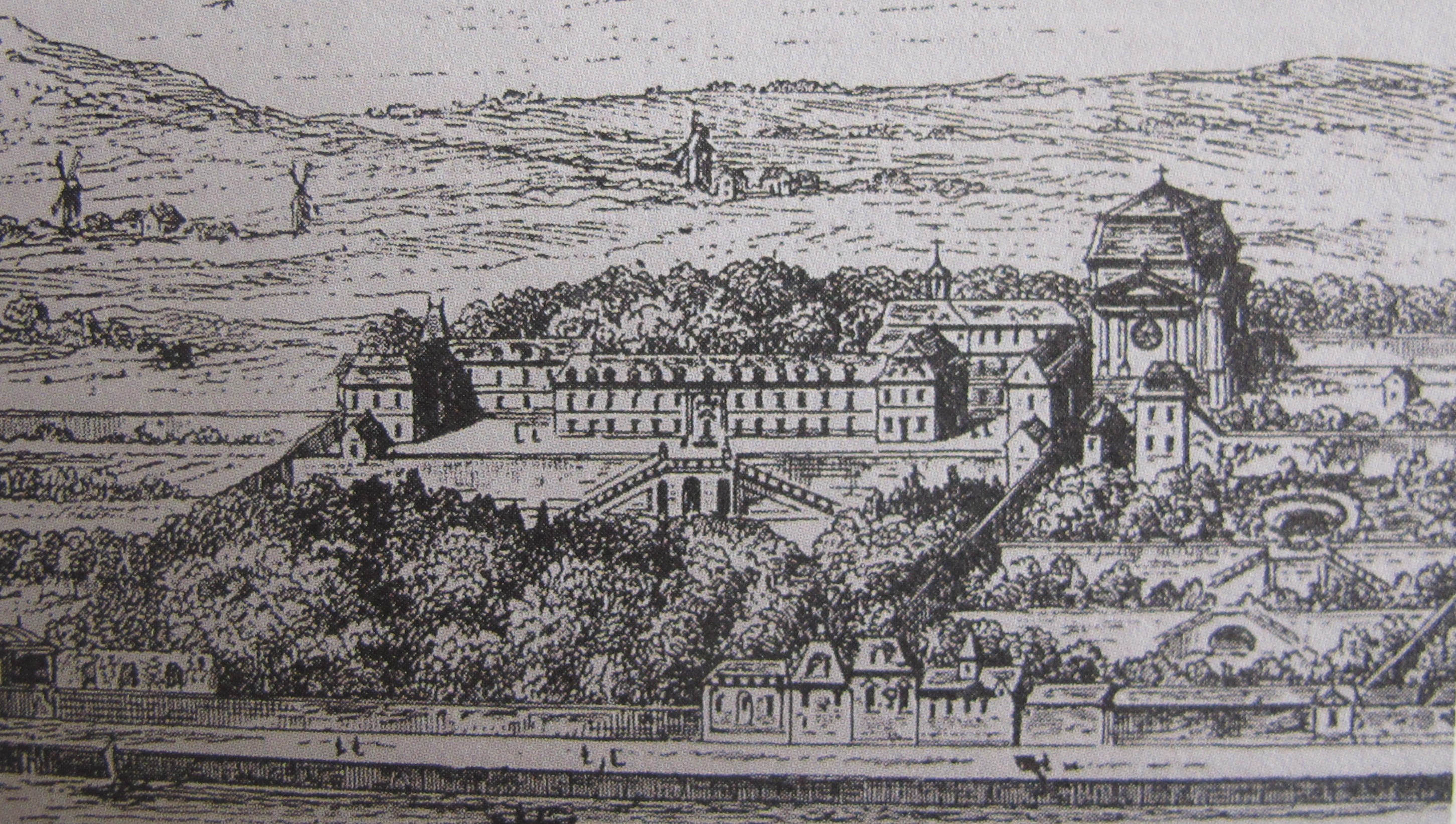
Convent of the Visitations, Chaillot founded by Louise de La Fayette

== See also ==
- Convent of the Visitandines de Chaillot
