= Valmont Abbey =

Abbey in Seine-Maritime, France

- Abbaye de Valmont, Sainte-Marie de Valmont or abbaye Sainte-Marie
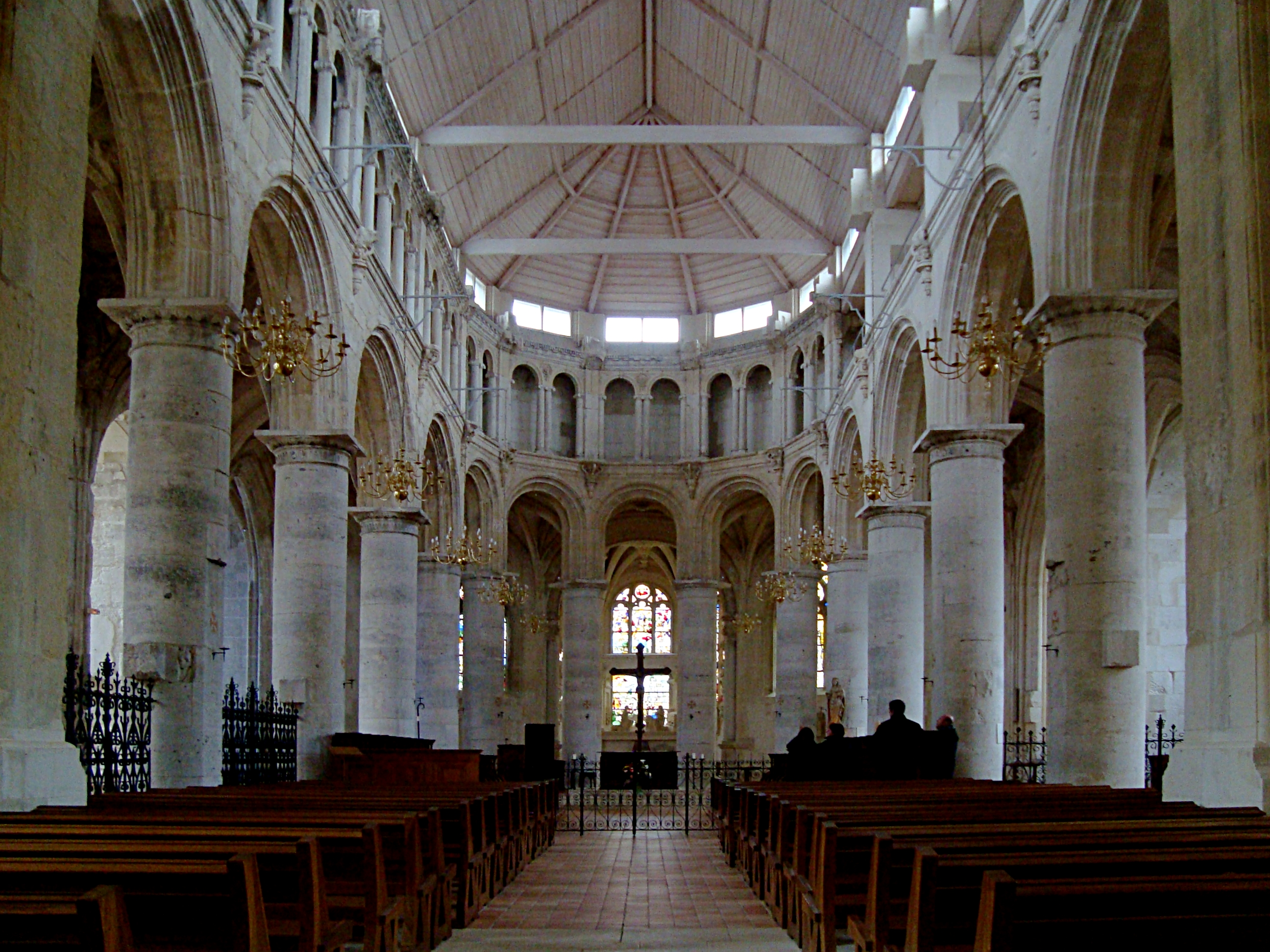
- The abbey chapel

- Location within France

Monastery information
- Order: Benedictine
- Established: 1169
- Mother house: Catholic

People
- Founder: Nicolas d'Estouteville

Architecture
- Style: Renaissance
- Completed date: 1782

Site
- Location: Valmont, Seine-Maritime, France
- Coordinates: 49°44′40″N 0°30′55″E

Valmont Abbey (Abbaye de Valmont, Sainte-Marie de Valmont or abbaye Sainte-Marie) is a Benedictine abbey in Valmont, Seine-Maritime, France. Its chapel and surviving ruins of other parts of the abbey were classed as historical monuments in 1951 and the facades and roofs of all the abbey buildings were made historic monuments in 1965.

== History ==
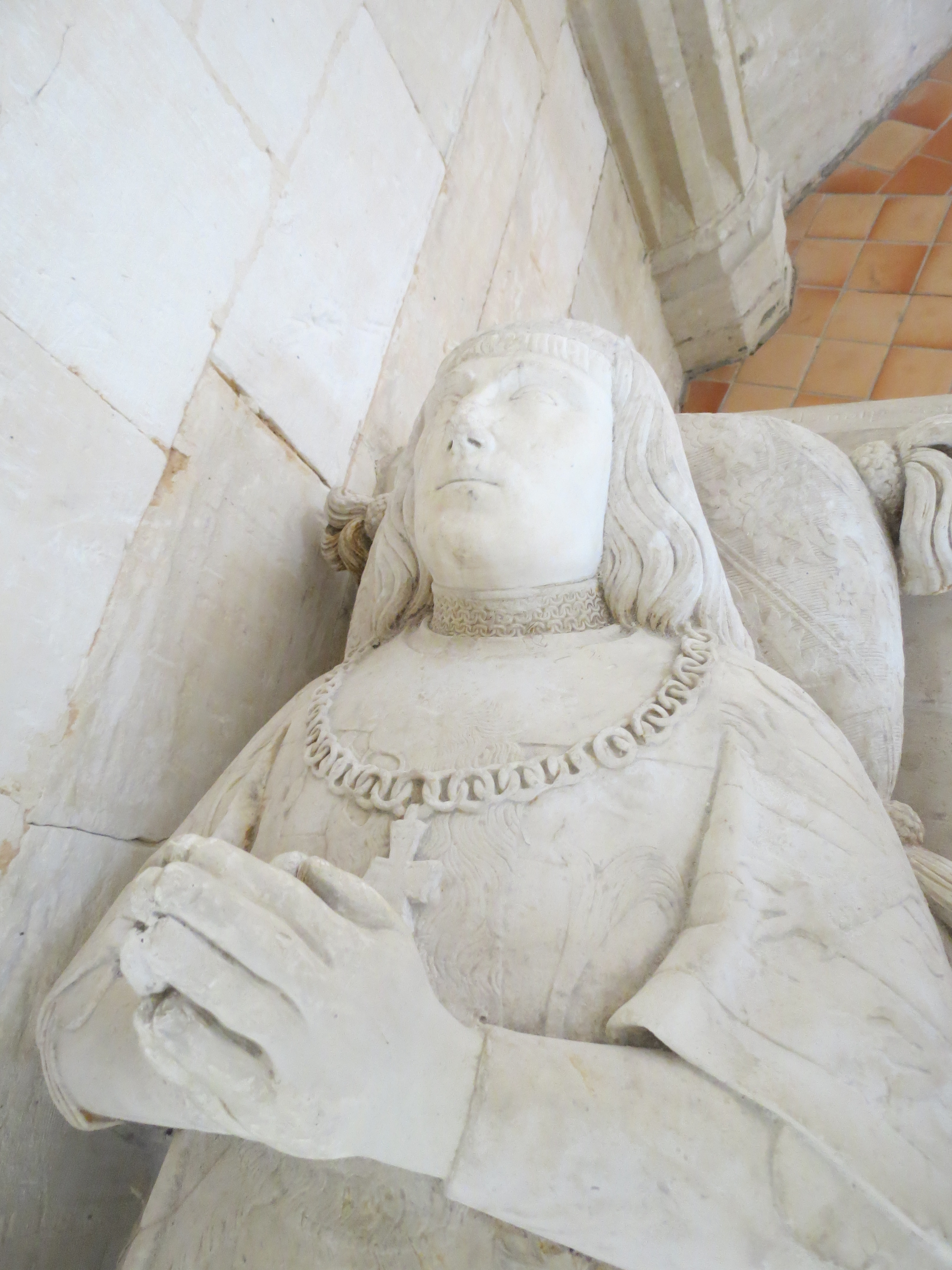
Statue of Nicolas d'Estouteville, founder of the Abbey

The Abbey was founded in 1169 by Nicolas d'Estouteville with Benedictines monks, from Hambye Abbey. It never had more than 25 monks and was destroyed and rebuilt several times with the abbey church only truly completed in the 16th century – Countess Marie II of Saint-Pol is buried in it.

The abbey buildings were built from 1678 to 1782 under Louis de La Fayette (1634–1729), commendatory abbot, who tried to introduce the Saint Maur reforms to the abbey in 1680. It was finally reformed in 1754 by the Maurists and was rebuilt during the second half of the 18th century, until the French Revolution when it was dissolved – its monks were dispersed in 1789 and its buildings sold off to private owners in 1791.

In the 19th century the painter Eugène Delacroix often holidayed at his family estate at Valmont and the abbey ruins inspired his drawing Ruines de l'abbaye de Valmont, now in The Louvre. The abbey became a monastic site again in 1994, re-founded by Benedictines nuns from Notre-Dame-du-Pré at Lisieux and re-dedicated in 2004.

== Architecture ==
The axial chapel of the abbey (from the 16th century) dedicated to the Virgin is the only surviving part of the main church as the nave collapsed in 1730. It is the artistic marvel of the site entirely in Renaissance style. The most well-known is the Chapel of Six O'clock which refers to the time when the monks heard the first office of the day. There are tombs and recumbent tombstones (from the 15th and 16th centuries) of the Lords of Estouteville and their wives. The vault is harmonious and well-designed: the very prominent ribs abut against a circular keystone recessed in the dome. Stained glass dating to 1552 depicts the life of the Virgin and, above the altar, an Annunciation attributed to Germain Pilon.

Of the abbey church itself, there remains only the ruins of the choir built in 1520. Consisting of four straight rows, it ends in a five-sided rounded end leading to an Ambulatory which opens in to the Chapel of Six O'clock. Large semicircular arches rest on cylindrical columns and are surmounted by a gallery of ionic columns forming the triforium. The whole is in very pure Renaissance style. This elegant architectural layout was designed by Jehan Ribaud, former abbot of Bec Abbey, who headed Valmont in 1517. It restored the abbey to the fashionable style and may have been used at the Abbey by Italian workers who worked at the time at the Chateau of Gaillon and Fécamp Abbey.

The Departmental Museum of Antiquities at Rouen conserves the 16th century stained glass from the Abbey.

== Sources ==
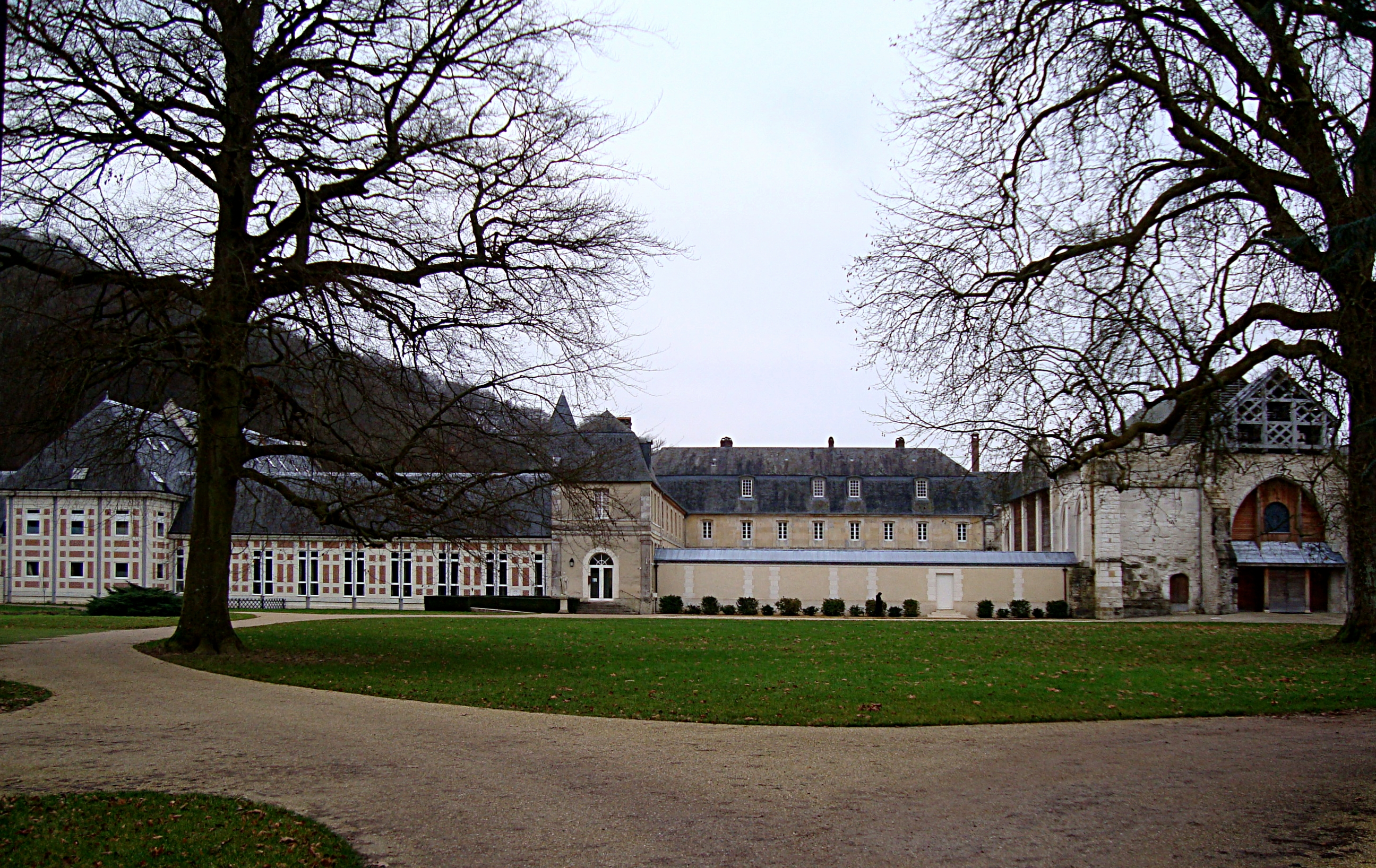
General View of the Abbey

- Valmont, in The Heritage of communes of Seine-Maritime, Charenton-le-Pont, Éditions Flohic, coll. "The Heritage of communes of France", 1997, 1389 pages, (ISBN 2-84234-017-5) (in French)
- Frédérique Barbut, The Abbeys Route in Normandy, Editions Ouest-France (ISBN 2-7373-2129-8) (in French)
- Seine-Maritime, Guides Gallimard, 1995 (ISBN 978-2-7424-0267-0) (in French)

== See also ==
- Valmont Abbey website (in French)
