= Gilbert Motier de La Fayette =

French noble

- Marshal of France Batons
- Born: 1380; Auvergne
- Died: 22 February 1463 (aged 82); Auvergne
- Burial place: Abbey of La Chaise-Dieu; 45°19′20″N 3°41′51″E
- Other name: Gilbert III de Lafayette
- Spouses: Dauphine de Montroignon; Jeanne de Joyeuse
- Military career
- Allegiance: Kingdom of France
- Service years: 1409-1449
- Rank: Marshal of France
- Conflicts: Hundred Years War: Battle of Baugé; Battle of Verneuil; siege of Orléans; Battle of Patay

Gilbert Motier de La Fayette (1380 – 22 February 1463) Seigneur of La Fayette, Pontgibaud, Ayes, Nébouzac, Saint-Romain and Montel-de-Gelat was a Marshal of France, namesake of and relation to Gilbert du Motier, Marquis de Lafayette.

== Biography ==
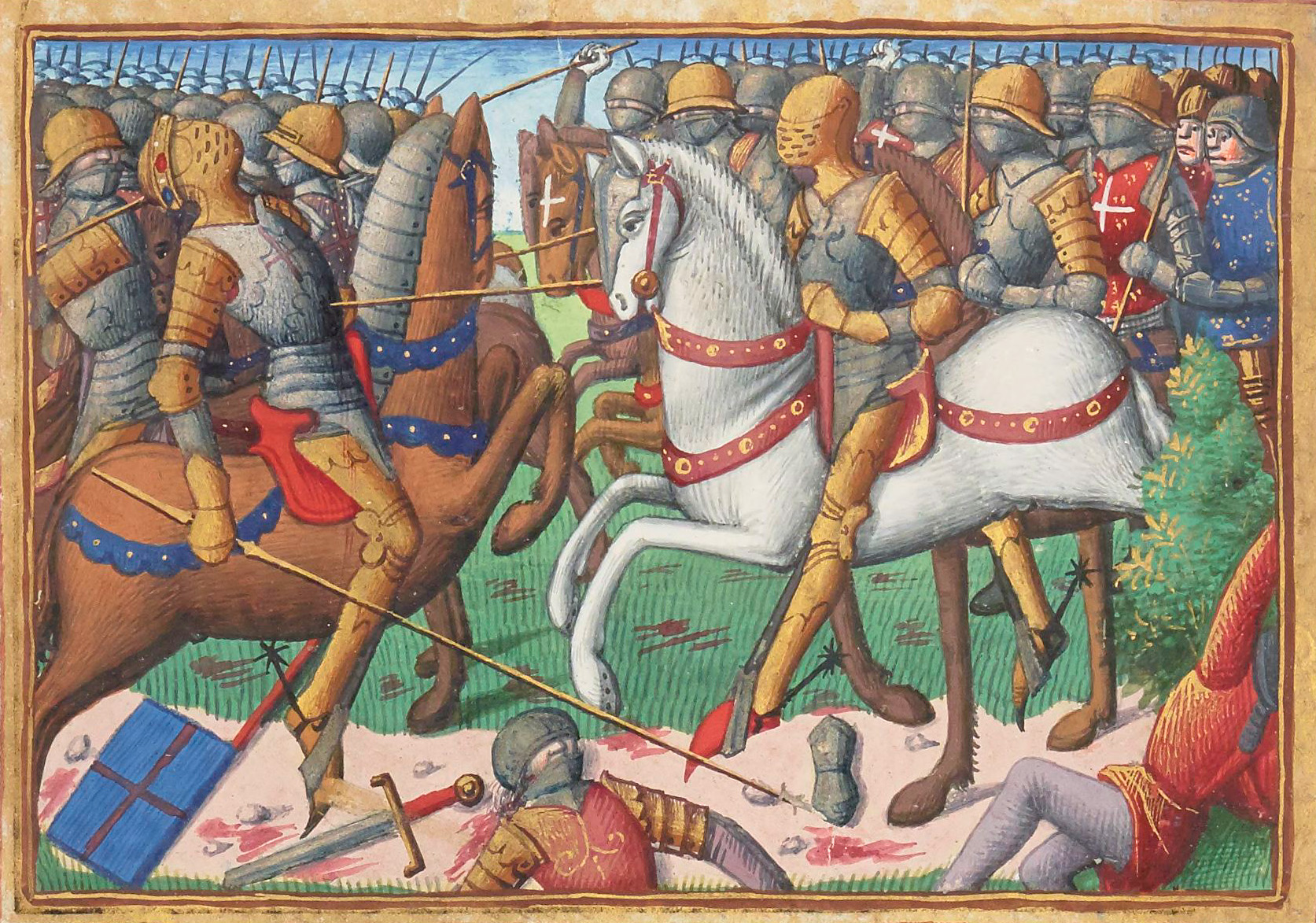
Battle of Baugé

Coat of arms with motto, "Cur non?" (Why not?)

Gilbert Motier de La Fayette (born 1380) was raised at the court of Louis II, Duke of Bourbon. La Fayette served in the military under the command of Marshal Boucicaut in Italy. In 1409, after the evacuation of Genoa La Fayette returned to France. He became the Seneschal of Bourbonnais.

In 1413, during the Hundred Years' War, La Fayette fought with John I, Duke of Bourbon at Soubise, Charente-Maritime. In 1415, he fought with the Duke of Bourbon at Compiègne. La Fayette was promoted to the rank of lieutenant-general. He served at Languedoc and Guyenne. La Fayette won victories against England and Burgundy in the Loire valley. In 1420, La Fayette was appointed Governor of Dauphiné and a Marshal of France. In 1421, La Fayette and John Stewart, Earl of Buchan commanded the Franco-Scottish troops at the Battle of Baugé. In 1424, at the Battle of Verneuil, La Fayette was taken prisoner by the English but was released after a short time.

In 1429, La Fayette with 300 men, fought with Joan of Arc during the relief of the Siege of Orléans and at the Battle of Patay.

On 17 July 1429, La Fayette attended the coronation of Charles VII in Reims and became a member of his Grand Conseil. With the exception of a short disgrace about 1430, due to the ill-will of Georges de la Trémoille, La Fayette retained royal favour throughout his life. In 1435, La Fayette was a signatory to the Treaty of Arras between Charles VII of France and Duke Philip the Good of Burgundy.

From 1445 to 1448, La Fayette contributed to reforms in the French army. For example, he established the use of military posts for the suppression of brigandage. In 1449, La Fayette was a signatory to the treaty with Edmund Beaufort, 2nd Duke of Somerset.

In 1449, La Fayette fought for France Normandy against the English. On 19 October 1449, he received the surrender of the city of Rouen.

La Fayette died on 23 February 1462 in Auvergne. He was buried in the Abbey of La Chaise-Dieu. On his headstone, is the word Merito, an anagram of his name.

== Family ==
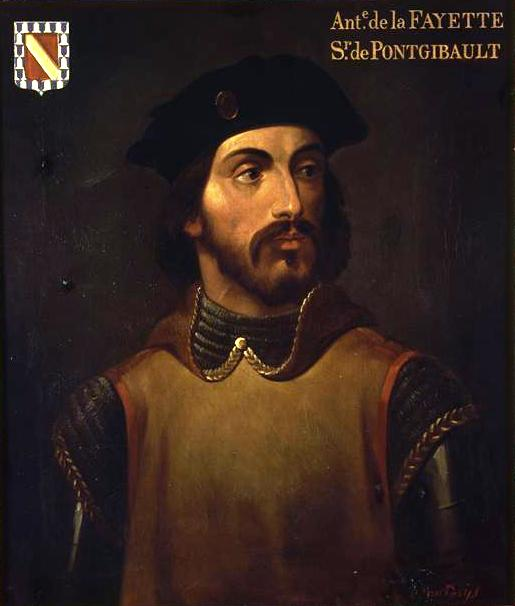
Antoine Motier de La Fayette

La Fayette was the son of William Motier La Fayette, Seigneur of La Fayette, knight and man at arms of John, Duke of Berry. His mother was Marguerite Catherine Brun du Peschin, Dame de Pontgibaud. La Fayette had a brother, Barthélemy, Prior of Voulte and two sisters, Algaye, wife of Bérnaud du Lac, Seigneur du Montel and Gilberte, wife of Jean de Vassel, Seigneur de Vassel, a knight.

La Fayette's first wife was Dauphine de Monteith (1400-1423) whom he married in 1420. On 15 January 1423, he married his second wife, Jeanne de Joyeuse (1405-1466), daughter of Lord Randon de Joyeuse and Catherine Aubert, Lady Monteil Gelat. Jeanne had nine children, including:

- Charles, Seigneur of La Fayette (1425–1486). Charles was knighted at the siege of Rouen in 1449. In 1466, he commanded fifty Lances fournies. In 1468, Charles attended the Estates General and by 1480, was an adviser and chamberlain of the king.;
- Antoine, Seigneur of Bothéon Veauche and Goutenourouze (1426–1480). Antoine was a counselor and chamberlain of King Louis XI. In 1470, he became Captain of Roque-Servieres. In 1486, he was Captain of Nonette.
- Françoise (born 1427) who married Jacques Fourrier.
- Jean (1430-1490), a Knight of St. John.
- Louis (born 1431) who was a canon and a Count of Lyon.
- Catherine (c.1432-1484). Catherine married Hughes de Chauvigny, the Baron de Blot (1410-1468). Their son, Raynard de Chauvigny de Blot (died 1491), was Abbot of La Chaise-Dieu (1465-1491).
- Anne (born 1434) who married François de Maubec, Seigneur de Maubec and de Montlear.
- Jeane (born 1435) and,
- Gilbert IV, Lord of Saint-Romain (1440–1527). From 1474 to 1486, Gilbert was an esquire to Louis XI and Charles VIII of France. In 1490, he became maître d'hotel to Charles VIII. Gilbert married Isabeau de Polignac. Their son, Antoine (1474-1531) Seigneur of Pontgibaud, Montel de Gelat and of Rochedagoux was a knight. He became the Governor of Boulogne, Seneschal of Ll'on-Thieu and by 1515, a Grand Master of Artillery. Their daughter was Anne (1475-1524). She married Louis Lastic.

La Fayette also had a natural daughter, Louise (died 1456). In 1419, she married Jehan de La Roche who inherited the Château de Tournoël, subject to an usufruct. Jehan was killed during the Battle of Verneuil in August 1424 at age 22. Louise and Jehan had three children. In 1428, when Jehan's father, Nicolas died, Jehan's brothers claimed the Château de Tournoël from Louise, the widow. Château de Tournoël was sequestered by the seneschal until a judicial settlement occurred. In 1429, the Château de Tournoël was given to Louise and her children.

La Fayette is the ancestor of Gilbert du Motier, Marquis de Lafayette, a French general who fought in the American Revolutionary War, French Revolution and July Revolution.
