= Aix-la-Fayette =

- Commune
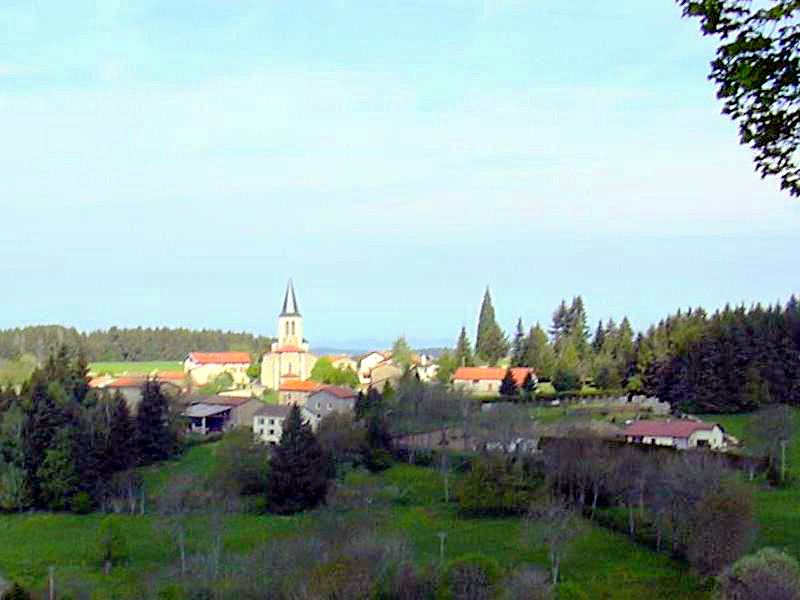
- General view in 2006.

- Coat of arms
- Location of Aix-la-Fayette
- Location within France Location within Auvergne-Rhône-Alpes
- Coordinates: 45°31′04″N 3°31′20″E
- Country: France
- Region: Auvergne-Rhône-Alpes
- Department: Puy-de-Dôme
- Arrondissement: Ambert
- Canton: Les Monts du Livradois
- Intercommunality: Ambert Livradois Forez

Government
  - Mayor (2026–32): Didier Vial
- Area^{1}: 13.00 km^{2} (5.02 sq mi)
- Highest elevation: 1,109 m (3,638 ft)
- Lowest elevation: 842 m (2,762 ft)
- Population (2023): 97
  - Density: 7.5/km^{2} (19/sq mi)
- Time zone: UTC+01:00 (CET)
  - Summer (DST): UTC+02:00 (CEST)
- INSEE/Postal code: 63002 /63980
- ^{1} French Land Register data, which excludes lakes, ponds, glaciers > 1 km^{2} (0.386 sq mi or 247 acres) and river estuaries.

Aix-la-Fayette (French pronunciation: [ɛks la fajɛt]; Occitan: Ais de la Faieta) is a commune in the Puy-de-Dôme department, Auvergne-Rhône-Alpes, central France.

It includes the hamlets of Ladoux, Le Clos, and Thirel.

== Population ==
Historical population
Year	Pop.	±% p.a.
1968	170	—
1975	146	−2.15%
1982	116	−3.23%
1990	91	−2.99%
1999	100	+1.05%
2007	78	−3.06%
2012	69	−2.42%
2017	93	+6.15%
2023	97	+0.70%
Source: INSEE

== See also ==
- Communes of the Puy-de-Dôme department
