= Marie de Hautefort =

French noble

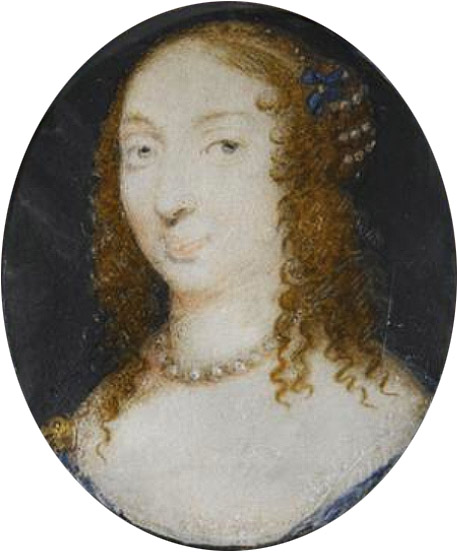
Marie d'Hautefort

Marie de Hautefort (1616–1691), was a French noble and lady-in-waiting, a trusted confidante and adviser of King Louis XIII. They did not have a sexual relationship, and she was thereby a favorite rather than a royal mistress. She was also a personal friend of Queen Anne.

== Life ==
Marie de Hautefort was born to Marquis Charles de Hautefort and Renée du Bellay. Her maternal grandmother Catherine le Voyer de Lignerolles was a lady-in-waiting to the Queen Dowager Marie de' Medici, and she made the acquaintance of the king in the daily gathering in the drawing room of Queen Anne, where he fell in love with her.

=== Favorite of Louis XIII ===
When the queen dowager was forced to leave France in 1630, the king replaced Madeleine du Fargis with her grandmother as dame d'atour and appointed Marie as fille d'honneur to the queen so that he could keep her at court with the words that Anne must love Marie for his sake. Madeleine du Fargis advised Anne to accept the arrangement with the words that whomever Louis loved, he could make love only with her.

Marie de Hautefort was described as a proud, virtuous beauty with a sharp wit. She became the king's acknowledged favorite, but she was never his lover and their relationship never became sexual. Marie de Hautefort was known to be such a prude that she categorically turned down men regardless of their intentions and even regarded correspondence about innocent topics with a man as a violation of her principles, and Louis XIII had a similar character and had religious scruples against sexual contacts outside of marriage. He had given her a position at court so that he could have her available at court, and he did spend a lot of time with her, arranging concerts, outings and hunts where songs and poems were dedicated to her honour; but never alone, and he always spoke to her with enough distance to make it impossible for them to touch each other.

However, the king's feelings were not reciprocated by Marie de Hautefort, who did listen to his confidences and gave him advice, but did not return his feelings. She refused to become the spy of Cardinal Richelieu, and instead became the personal friend as well as the spy of Queen Anne, whom she informed of the king's confidences. Marie de Hautefort and the queen reportedly even joked with each other about the king's infatuation with her, incidents which made the relationship between Hautefort and the king to a row of conflicts followed by reconciliations by the mediation of Richelieu.

She was in parallel a favorite of the queen, whose feelings she did reciprocate, assisted her in her secret correspondence and supported her when she was accused of being a Spanish spy. When Anne's spy La Porte was arrested, Hautefort visited him in the Bastille dressed as a servant to inform him so that his and Anne's stories could adjust to each other so that they would know what to say during inquest and not give each other away.

In 1635, she lost her position as favorite when Richelieu arranged for Louise de La Fayette to become the new object of the king's platonic love, but she regained it when Louise de La Fayette entered a convent in 1637. She was even promoted to share the post of dame d'atour with her grandmother, which gave her title of 'Madame' despite her unmarried status.

In November 1639, however, the king finally tired of the constant conflicts and reconciliations in his unanswered relationship with Marie de Hautefort and had her exiled from court and replaced as favorite by Henri Coiffier de Ruzé, Marquis of Cinq-Mars.

=== Later life ===
When Louis XIII died and Anne became regent in 1643, Marie de Hautefort was recalled to court and resumed her position as Dame d'atour. For a time, she belonged to the circle of favorites of the queen regent. However, she became a member of the religious Importante party at court under the duke of Beaufort and started to give the regent remarks about the purported love affair between queen Anne and Mazarin and encouraged the queen to dismiss him. This resulted in her banishment from court in April 1644.

In September 1646, she married Charles de Schomberg, Marschal of France, and in 1652, she moved with him to Metz, when he was appointed governor of the city. Schomberg died in 1656, they had no children.

== Sources ==
- Jacques Magne, Marie de Hautefort, le grand amour de Louis XIII, éditions Perrin, 2000 (ISBN 2262016348)
- Victor Cousin, Mme de Hautefort et Mme de Chevreuse, vol. 1, Paris, Ed. Didier, 1856
- Kleinman, Ruth: Anne of Austria. Queen of France. ISBN 0-8142-0429-5. Ohio State University Press (1985)
