= Françoise de Lansac =

French courtier

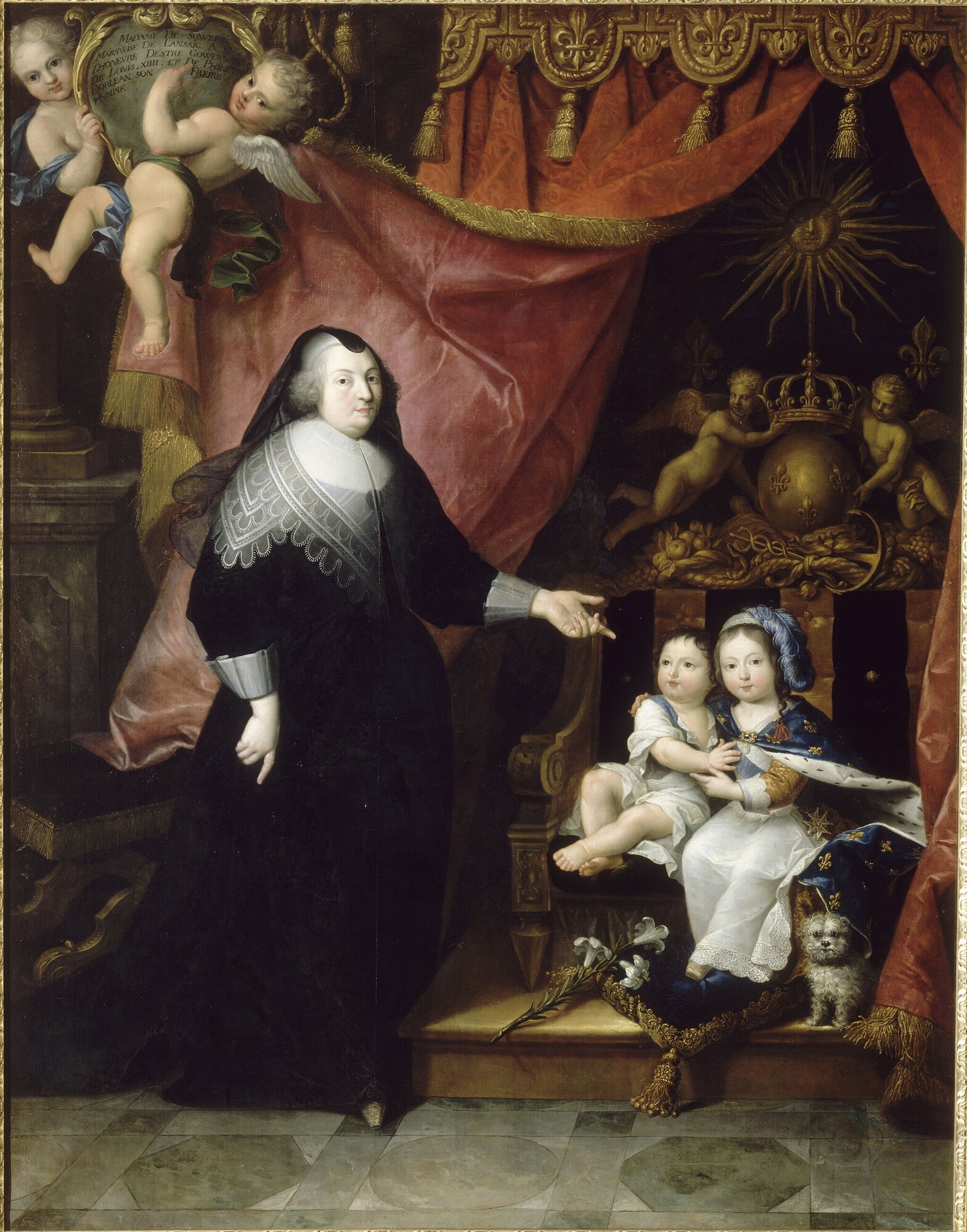
Françoise de Souvré, marquise de Lansac, et les enfants de France

Françoise de Lansac, née de Sainte-Maure de Montausier (1582-1657) was a French courtier. She was the royal governess of the future King Louis XIV and his brother Philippe from 1638 until 1643.

She was the daughter of Gilles de Souvré and married to Artus de Saint Gelais in 1601. She was a relative of Cardinal Richelieu. In 1638, King Louis XIII and Cardinal Richelieu reorganised the household of the Queen and replaced everyone considered disloyal to the king and the cardinal with their own loyalists.

Consequently, Françoise de Lansac was appointed Royal Governess, and Count de Brassac and his spouse Catherine de Brassac were appointed to the positions superintendent of the household of the queen and Première dame d'honneur, respectively, in order to keep the queen and her household under control.

When Queen Anne became regent in 1643, she replaced her with Marie-Catherine de Senecey.

Court offices
Preceded by Françoise de Montglat	Governess of the Children of France; 1638-1643	Succeeded by Marie-Catherine de Senecey
