= Catherine Le Voyer =

French court official

Catherine Le Voyer (1571–1657), was a French court official. She served as the dame d'atours to the queen of France, Anne of Austria in between 1630 and 1657. She has also been known as Madame de la Flotte och Madame de Hauterive.

She was the daughter of Philibert Le Voyer, Seigneur of Lignerolles, and Anne de Rodulph, and married René du Bellay, Baron of la Flotte-Hauterive. She was a lady-in-waiting to Marie de' Medici until Marie left France in 1630. In 1630, she was appointed to the office of dame d'atour in succession to Madeleine du Fargis. She was the grandmother of Marie de Hautefort, whom she introduced at court and who was appointed to be her deputy. She was a central figure in the French royal court and mentioned in contemporary memoirs.

Court offices
Preceded by Madeleine du Fargis	Dame d'atour to the Queen of France; 1630–1643	Succeeded by Anne Marie de Bethune
