= Madeleine du Fargis =

French courtier

Madeleine du Fargis, née de Silly (died 1639), was a French courtier and agent. She served as dame d'atour to the queen of France, Anne of Austria, in 1626–1630. She was an intimate favorite and influential confidant of the queen.

== Life ==
She was a relative of the famous Madame de Rambouillet and had been raised in a convent where she was placed against her will by her father because of what he considered to be immoral behavior. Upon the death of her father, she was released from the convent and joined Madame de Rambouillet. She was introduced to Charles d'Angennes, Seigneur de Fargis, whom she married. She accompanied him to Spain where he served as ambassador of France in 1620-24.

=== Court career ===
When the dame d'atour to the queen, Marie-Catherine de Senecey, was promoted to dame d'honneur in succession to Charlotte de Lannoy in 1626, Madeleine du Fargis succeeded to the post of dame d'atour through the influence of Cardinal Richelieu. She was placed in the queen's household because the cardinal expected her to act as his agent there.

Being from the petty nobility who could not normally expect such a position, Richelieu expected her to be grateful to him for getting her the post; and being raised in a convent, he also expected her to be religious and loyal to him in his position of cardinal; furthermore, she was a personal friend of his niece, Madame de Combalet. Described as pox marked but with great charm and a somewhat coarse humor, literary connections and excellent Spanish, she was also expected to be able to amuse and befriend queen Anne and become her confidant.

Madeleine du Fargis did in fact very swiftly become a personal friend, trusted confidant and favorite of the queen. However, she had no loyalty toward Richelieu, refused to become his spy and instead allied herself with the queen's opposition party against the cardinal. In December 1630, Louis XIII reduced Anne's court and purged a great amount of her favorites as punishment for a plot in which the queen had cooperated with queen dowager Marie de Medici' in an attempt to depose Cardinal Richelieu.

Among those fired were Madame de Motteville and Madeleine du Fargis. Queen Anne asked the Cardinal to intervene so that she may keep du Fargis and told him that if he did not, she would never forgive him: when he refused, she swore that she would never forgive him.

=== Agent ===
du Fargis left for Brussels, where her spouse had sided with the king's brother Gaston, Duke of Orléans against the monarch, and engaged in an illegal secret correspondence with Queen Anne. After the invasion of Gaston in 1632, letters were discovered from du Fargis to people in Paris describing the plans of a marriage between Gaston and Anne after the death of Louis XIII. Anne was questioned and confirmed that the letters were written by du Fargis, but denied corresponding with her of knowledge of the plans, and as there were no letters found by du Fargis to the queen, there were no consequences for Anne.

She could resume her correspondence with Madeleine du Fargis as well as with Marie de Rohan, who both acted as her agents, received money from her and channeled her letters to other contacts. In July 1637, for example, Anne gave du Fargis the mission to examine whether there was any truth to the rumor of an alliance between France and England, as this would force Spain to cut off diplomatic connections to France and disturb her network of couriers between the Spanish embassies of Paris and Brussels.

Madeleine du Fargis died in 1639.

Court offices
Preceded by Marie-Catherine de Senecey	Dame d'atour to the Queen of France; 1626–1630	Succeeded by Catherine le Voyer de Lignerolles
