= Marie Claire de Bauffremont =

French courtier

- Countess of Fleix
- Full name: Marie Claire de Bauffremont
- Born: July 11, 1618; Sennecey-le-Grand
- Died: July 29, 1680 (aged 62); Paris, France
- Spouses: Jean Baptiste Gaston de Foix, Count of Fleix (1637)
- Issue: Jean Baptiste Gaston, Duke of Randan
- Father: Henri de Bauffremont, Marquis of Senecey
- Mother: Marie Catherine de La Rochefoucauld

Marie Claire de Bauffremont (July 11, 1618– July 29, 1680) was a French courtier. She served as Première dame d'honneur to the queen dowager of France, Anne of Austria, from 1643 until 1666.

She was the daughter of Henri de Bauffremont, marquise de Senecey, and Marie-Catherine de Senecey, and married to Jean Baptiste Gaston de Foix, comte de Fleix (1617–1646), in 1637. Her mother was a favorite of queen Anne who had been banished from court by Cardinal Richelieu, and when queen Anne became regent in 1643, she appointed Marie-Catherine de Senecey royal governess and her daughter to the office of Première dame d'honneur.

By the request of her mother, she inherited the title duchess de Randan after her. She also inherited the title marquise de Sennecey after her childless brother in 1641.

Court offices
Preceded by Catherine de Brassac	Première dame d'honneur to Anne of Austria; 1643–1666	Succeeded by None
