= Marie-Catherine de Senecey =

French courtier

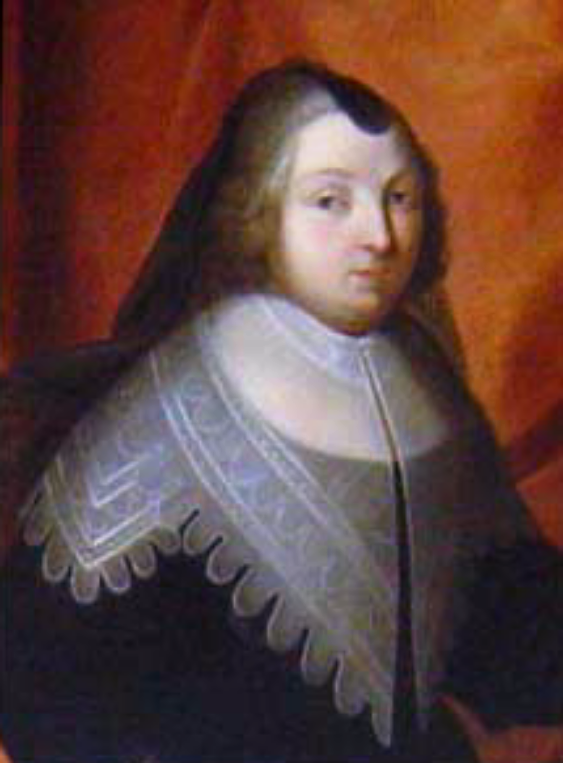
Portrait of the Marquise of Senecey.

Marie Catherine de Senecey née de La Rochefoucauld (1588–1677) was a French courtier. She served as Première dame d'honneur to the queen of France, Anne of Austria, from 1626 until 1638, and royal governess to King Louis XIV and his brother from 1643 until 1646.

== Life ==
Marie-Catherine de Senecey was the daughter of Jean Louis de La Rochefoucauld, Count of Randan. She married Henri de Bauffremont, Marquis of Senecey (1577–1622), in 1607, and was thereafter known as Marquise de Senecey.

In 1626, she was appointed Dame d'atour to queen Anne, and when Charlotte de Lannoy died later that year, she was promoted to succeed her as Première dame d'honneur, and was herself succeeded as Dame d'atour by Madeleine du Fargis. She was well liked by queen Anne, and loyal to the queen before Cardinal Richelieu.

In 1638, the king relieved her from her office and banished her from court for being in opposition to Cardinal Richelieu, and for having encouraged Louise de La Fayette to enter a convent.

When Anne became regent in 1643, she recalled Madame de Senecey to court and appointed her to replace Françoise de Lansac as royal governess and her daughter Marie-Claire de Fleix to replace Catherine de Brassac as Première dame d'honneur.

In March 1661, Louis XIV created the Duchy of Randan and made her the first duchess of Randan as a recognition of her services.

== Children ==
1. Marie Claire de Bauffremont (July 11, 1618 – July 29, 1680) married Jean Baptiste Gaston de Foix, Count of Fleix and had children.

Court offices
Preceded by Antoinette d'Albert de Luynes	Dame d'atour to the Queen of France; 1626–1626	Succeeded by Madeleine du Fargis
Preceded by Charlotte de Lannoy	Première dame d'honneur to the Queen of France; 1626–1638	Succeeded by Catherine de Brassac
Preceded by Françoise de Lansac	Governess of the Children of France; 1643–1646	Succeeded by Julie d'Angennes
