= Madeleine de Souvré, marquise de Sablé =

French philosopher, writer and salonnière (1599–1678)

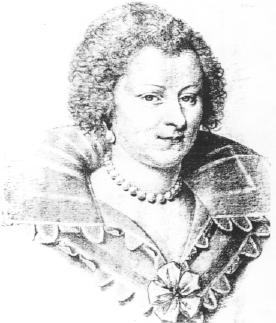
- Born: 1599; Courtanvaux Castle, Bessé-sur-Braye
- Died: 16 January 1678; Port-Royal Abbey, Paris
- Occupations: epigrammatist, salonist
- Writing career
- Notable work: Maximes de Madame la Marquise de Sablé (1678)

Madeleine de Souvré, marquise de Sablé (1599 – 16 January 1678) was a French philosopher, writer and salonnière.

== Life ==
She was the daughter of Gilles de Souvré, marquis de Courtenvaux, tutor of Louis XIII, and marshal of France.

In 1614 she married Philippe Emmanuel de Laval, marquis de Sablé, who died in 1640, leaving her in somewhat straitened circumstances. With her friend the comtesse de Saint Maure she took rooms in the Place Royale, Paris, and established a literary salon. The class of literature, of which the Maximes of La Rochefoucauld is one of the best-known examples, originated here.

The Maximes of the marquise de Sablé were in fact composed before those of La Rochefoucauld, though not published until after her death. In 1655 she retired, with the comtesse de St Maur, to the Convent of Port Royal des Champs, near Magny in the Chevreuse valley, removing in 1661, when that establishment was closed, to Auteuil. In 1669 she took up her residence in the Port Royal convent in Paris, where she died on 16 January 1678.
