= Suzanne de Navailles =

Duchess de Navailles (1625-1700)

Susanne de Baudéan de Neuillant de Parabere, duchess de Navailles
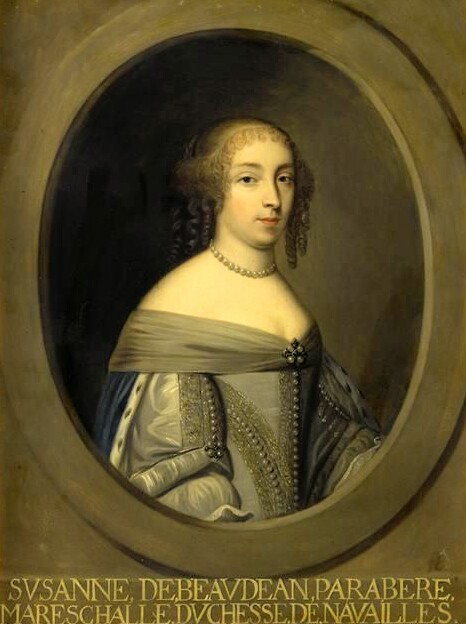
- Susanne de Navailles
- Born: 1625
- Died: 1700 (aged 74–75)
- Occupation: French courtier
- Known for: Première dame d'honneur to the queen of France (1660–1664)
- Office: Première dame d'honneur to the Queen of France
- Predecessor: Catherine de Brassac
- Successor: Julie d'Angennes
- Spouse(s): Philippe de Montaut-Bénac, duc de Navailles
- Parent(s): Charles, comte de Neuillan

Susanne de Baudéan de Neuillant de Parabere, duchess de Navailles (1625-1700) was a French courtier. She served as Première dame d'honneur to the queen of France, Maria Theresa of Spain, from 1660 until 1664.

== Life ==
Suzanne de Navailles was the daughter of Charles, comte de Neuillan. She married to Philippe de Montaut-Bénac, duc de Navailles in 1651.

She was appointed to the position of Première dame d'honneur to the new queen of France, Maria Theresa of Spain, prior to the new queen's arrival. When the royal wedding took place in Southern France near the border to Spain, the French courters appointed to serve the new queen was sent to welcome her, and the majority of Maria Theresa's Spanish entourage was exchanged for the French eqvivalents that had been appointed for her, and consequently, Suzanne de Navailles replaced her Spanish equvivalent, Camarera Mayor Margarita Zapata de Mendoza, who returned to Spain with the Spanish ladies-in-waitings after the wedding, while Suzanne de Navailles and the French ladies-in-waitings accompanied Maria Theresa to Paris.

She was foremost known for her role in opposing the king's adultery with the queen's maids-of-honour, which resulted in her banishment from court. In her position of Première dame d'honneur, she was responsible for the ladies-in-waiting of the queen.

When king Louis XIV started to court a maid-of-honour to the queen, Anne-Lucie de la Mothe-Houdancourt, de Navailles protested to the king, using religious arguments. The king reprimanded her and ordered her to stop interfering, asking her to consider the effects of his displeasure, and the advantages of her compliance. After having consulted a priest, however, she remained steadfast in her opposition and attempts to prevent the king from gaining access to the bedchamber of the maids-of-honour, going so far as to have bars placed to the secret entries to the chamber. This resulted in the disgrace, dismissal and banishment from court for both her and her spouse in 1664.

The incident is described by Saint-Simon:

She was a woman of spirit and of virtue, and the young ladies of honour were put under her charge. The King was at this time young and gallant. So long as he held aloof from the chamber of the young ladies, Madame de Navailles meddled not, but she kept her eye fixed upon all that she controlled. She soon perceived that the King was beginning to amuse himself, and immediately after she found that a door had secretly been made into the chamber of the young ladies; that this door communicated with a staircase by which the King mounted into the room at night, and was hidden during the day by the back of a bed placed against it. Upon this Madame de Navailles held counsel with her husband. On one side was virtue and honour, on the other, the King’s anger, disgrace, and exile. The husband and wife did not long hesitate. Madame de Navailles at once took her measures, and so well, that in a few hours one evening the door was entirely closed up. During the same night the King, thinking to enter as usual by the little staircase, was much surprised to no longer find a door. He groped, he searched, he could not comprehend the disappearance of the door, or by what means it had become wall again. Anger seized him; he doubted not that the door had been closed by Madame de Navailles and her husband. He soon found that such was the case, and on the instant stripped them of almost all their offices, and exiled them from the Court.

She retired with her spouse to their countryside estates, but their banishment was revoked by the king on the wishes of his mother in 1666.

Court offices
Preceded by Catherine de Brassac	Première dame d'honneur to the Queen of France; 1660–1664	Succeeded by Julie d'Angennes
