= Première dame d'honneur =

Office at the royal court of France

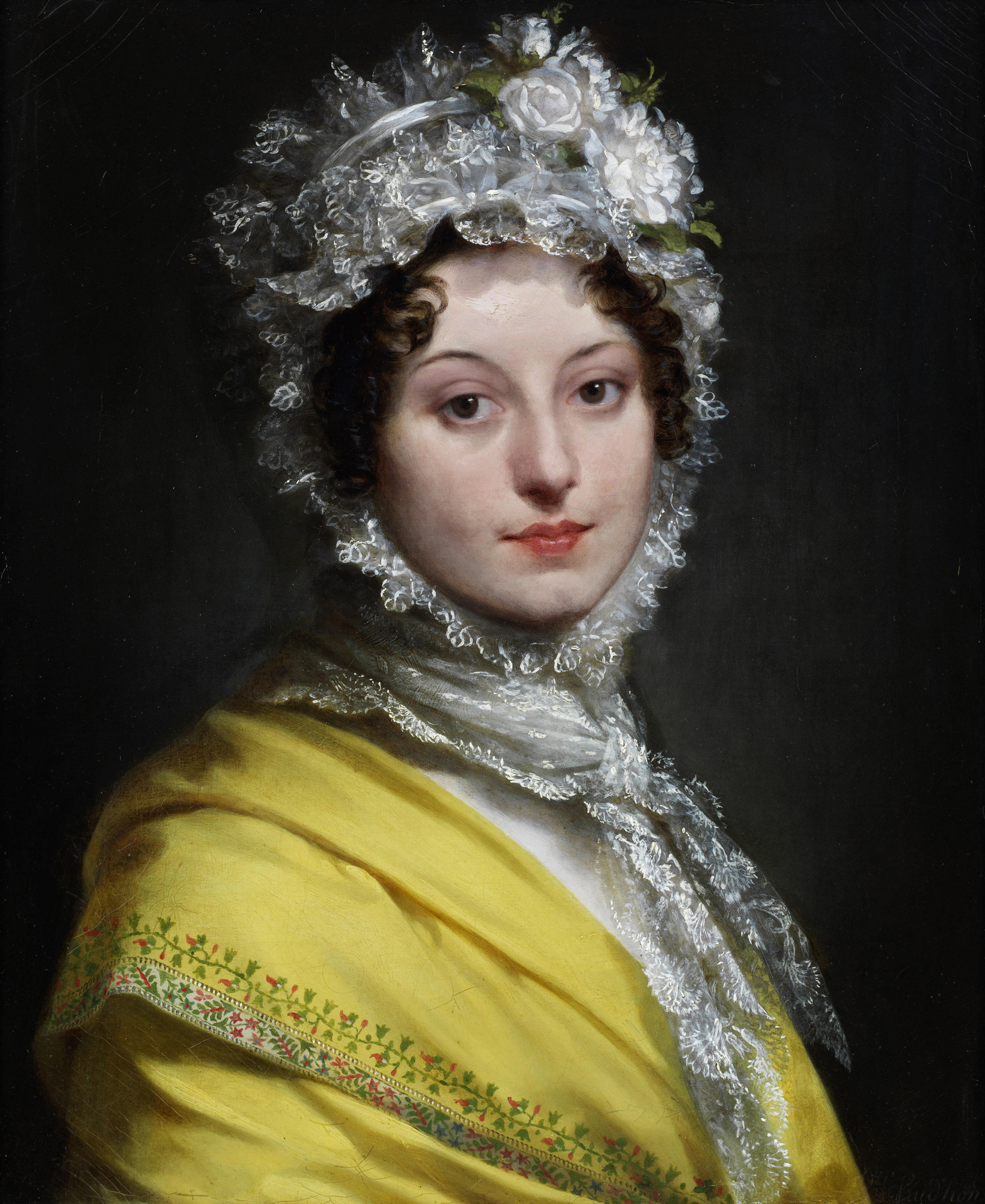
Prud'hon – Louise Antoinette Scholastique Guéheneuc (1782–1856)

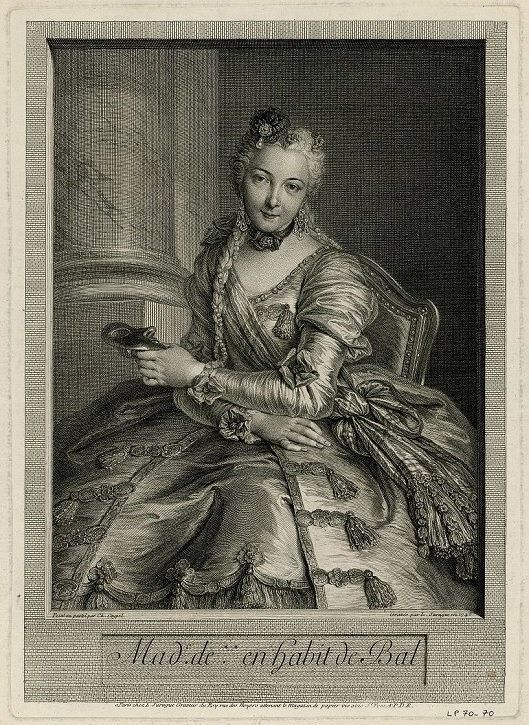
Countess de Noailles

Première dame d'honneur (French pronunciation: [pʁəmjɛʁ dam dɔnœʁ], lit. 'first lady of honour'), or simply dame d'honneur (lit. 'lady of honour'), was an office at the royal court of France. It existed in nearly all French courts from the 16th-century onward. Though the tasks of the post shifted, the dame d'honneur was normally the first or second rank of all ladies-in-waiting. The dame d'honneur was selected from the members of the highest French nobility.

== History ==
The office was created in 1523.

The term Dame d'honneur has also been used as a general term for a (married) French lady-in-waiting. Initially, the married ladies-in-waiting who attended the queen of France had the title Dame. This was simply the title of a married lady-in-waiting, who was not the principal lady-in-waiting.

From 1523, the group of 'Dame' (married) ladies-in-waiting who attended the court as companions of the queen had the formal title Dame d'honneur ('Lady of Honour', commonly only 'Dame'), hence the title 'Première dame d'honneur' ('First lady of honour') to distinguish between the principal lady-in-waiting and the group of remaining (married) ladies-in-waiting. In 1674, the position of Fille d'honneur was abolished, and the 'Dames' were renamed Dame du Palais. Thus, the title Dame d'honneur was henceforth reserved for one office holder.

=== Tasks ===
The task of the dame d'honneur was to supervise the female courtiers, control the budget, order necessary purchases, and organize the annual account and staff list; she supervised the daily routine and attended both ordinary and ceremonial court functions, as well as escorting and introducing those seeking audience with the queen. She had the keys to the queen's personal rooms in her possession.

When the Dame d'honneur was absent, she was replaced by the Dame d'atour, who normally had the responsibility of overseeing the queen's wardrobe and jewelry in addition to dressing the queen.

In 1619, the office of the Surintendante de la Maison de la Reine, or simply surintendante, was created. The surintendante had roughly the same tasks as the Dame d'honneur—receiving the oath of the female personnel before they took office, supervising the daily routine of the staff and the queen, organizing the accounts and staff list—but she was placed in rank above the dame d'honneur. Whenever the surintendante was absent, she was replaced by the dame d'honneur. The post of Surintendante could be left vacant for long periods, such as between the death of Marie Anne de Bourbon in 1741 and the appointment of Princess Marie Louise of Savoy in 1775.

=== Later history ===
The position of Dame d'honneur was revived during the First Empire, when the principal lady-in-waiting to the empress held the same title.

During the Second Empire, the dame d'honneur had the same position as before, but was now formally ranked second below a surintendante with the title Grande-Maîtresse.

== List of premières dames d'honneur to the queens and empresses of France ==
Though the office was commonly only referred to as "Dame d'honneur", this list use the full title of "Première dame d'honneur".

=== Eleanor of Austria, 1530–1547 ===
- 1530–1535 : Louise de Montmorency
- 1535–1538 : Jeanne d'Angoulême, dame de Givry
- 1538–1547 : Vacant

=== Catherine de' Medici, 1547–1589 ===
- 1547–1560: Françoise de Brézé
- 1560–1561: Jacqueline de Longwy
- 1561–1578: Philippe de Montespedon
- 1578–1589: Alphonsine Strozzi, comtesse de Fiesque

=== Mary Stuart, 1559–1560 ===
- 1559–1560: Guillemette de Sarrebruck

=== Elisabeth of Austria, 1570–1574 ===
- 1570–1574: Madeleine of Savoy

=== Louise of Lorraine, 1575–1601 ===
- 1575–1583: Jeanne de Dampierre
- 1583–1585: Louise de Cipierre (jointly with de Randan)
- 1583–1601: Fulvie de Randan (jointly with de Cipierre)

=== Marie de' Medici, 1600–1632 ===
- 1600–1632: Antoinette de Pons

=== Anne of Austria, 1615–1666 ===
For the first years in France, before her Spanish entourage was sent back to Spain, Anne had both a French and a Spanish office holder in several posts of her court.

- 1615–1618: Inés de la Torre (jointly with de Montmorency)
- 1615–1624: Laurence de Montmorency (jointly with de la Torre)
- 1624–1626: Charlotte de Lannoy
- 1626–1638: Marie-Catherine de Senecey
- 1638–1643: Catherine de Brassac
- 1643–1666: Marie-Claire de Fleix

=== Maria Theresa of Spain, 1660–1683 ===
- 1660–1664: Susanne de Navailles
- 1664–1671: Julie de Montausier
- 1671–1679: Anne de Richelieu
- 1679–1683: Anne-Armande de Crequy

=== Marie Leszczyńska, 1725–1768 ===
- 1725–1735: Catherine-Charlotte de Boufflers
- 1735–1763: Marie de Luynes
- 1751–1761: Henriette-Nicole Pignatelli d'Egmont, duchess de Chevreuse (deputy)
- 1763–1768: Anne de Noailles (first term)

=== Marie Antoinette, 1774–1792 ===
- 1774–1775: d'Arpajon, Countess de Noailles (second term)
- 1775–1791: Laure Auguste de Fitz-James, Princess of Chimay
- 1791–1792: Geneviève de Gramont, Countess d'Ossun

=== Joséphine de Beauharnais, 1804–1814 ===
- 1804–1809: Adélaïde de La Rochefoucauld

=== Marie Louise, 1810–1814 ===
- 1810–1814: Louise Antoinette Lannes, Duchess of Montebello

=== Maria Amalia of Naples and Sicily, 1830–1848 ===
- 1830–1848: Christine-Zoë de Montjoye, marquise de Dolomieu

=== Eugénie de Montijo, 1853–1870 ===
- 1853–1867: Pauline de Bassano
- 1867–1870: Marie-Anne Walewska

== List of premières dames d'honneur to the dauphine of France ==
The Household of the wife of the heir to the throne were normally appointed one year before the royal bride arrived to France, so that they could be a part of the royal welcome entourage.

=== Maria Anna Victoria of Bavaria, 1680–1690 ===
- 1679–1684: Anne de Richelieu

=== Marie Adélaïde of Savoy, 1711–1712 ===
- 1711–1712: Marguerite Louise Susanne de Béthune, Duchess of Lude

=== Maria Teresa Rafaela of Spain, 1744–1746 ===
- 1744–1746: Marie-Angélique Frémyn de Moras, Duchess of Brancas

=== Maria Josepha of Saxony, Dauphine of France, 1747–1767 ===
- 1746–1762: Marie-Angélique Frémyn de Moras, Duchess Brancas
- 1762–1767: Louise-Diane-Françoise de Clermont, Duchess of Brancas

=== Marie Antoinette, 1770–1774 ===
- 1770–1774: Anne d'Arpajon, Countess of Noailles

=== Marie Thérèse of France, 1814–1830 ===
- 1814–1823: Bonne Marie Félicité de Montmorency-Luxembourg, Duchess of Sérent
- 1823–1830: Anne-Félicité Simone de Sérent, Duchess of Damas-Crux

== See also ==
- Mistress of the Robes, British equivalent
- Camarera mayor de Palacio, Spanish equivalent
- Chief Court Mistress, Dutch, German, Scandinavian and Russian equivalent
