= Marie Angélique Frémyn =

Marie Angélique Frémyn (1676–1763) was a French courtier and memoir writer and Duchess of Villars Brancas by marriage. She was born to Guillaume Frémyn, Count of Moras and Marie Angélique Cadeau, and married in 1760 to Louis Antoine de Brancas, 4th Duke of Villars-Brancas, Peer of France (1682–1760).

She was Première dame d'honneur to María Teresa Rafaela of Spain and Maria Josepha of Saxony, Dauphine of France between 1746 and 1762.

She is known for her memoirs about her life at the royal court, with particular regard to the affairs of the Duchess of Châteauroux, former mistress to Louis XV. They were published posthumously under the titles of Mémoires de la duchesse de Brancas sur Louis XV et Mme de Châteauroux. Édition augmentée d'une préface et de notes par Louis Lacour (Paris, Jouaust, 1865) and Mémoires de la duchesse de Brancas, suivis de la correspondance de Mme de Châteauroux et d'extraits des Mémoires pour servir à l'Histoire de Perse, publiés avec préface, notes et tables par Eugène Asse (Paris, Librairie des bibliophiles, 1890).
