= Anne de Richelieu =

French court official

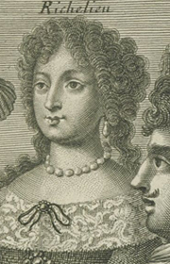
Anne de Richelieu (1622–1684)

Anne de Richelieu née Poussard de Fors du Vigean (1622–1684) was a French court official. She served as Première dame d'honneur to the queen of France, Maria Theresa of Spain in 1671–1679 and to the dauphine Maria Anna Victoria of Bavaria in 1679–1684.

== Life ==
Anne de Richelieu was the daughter of François Poussard, baron de Fors et sieur du Vigean and Anne de Neufbourg; she married François-Alexandre d'Albret, sire de Pons and comte de Marennes (16??–1648) in 1644, and Armand Jean de Vignerot du Plessis in 1649.

She was appointed Première dame d'honneur to the queen on 21 November 1671. Anne de Richelieu did not have a bad relation to Madame de Montespan but actually contributed to a cordial relationship between Montespan and the queen. During the temporary estrangement between the king and Montespan in 1675, Anne de Richelieu brought about a meeting and a reconciliation between the queen and Montespan, for which the king expressed his gratitude toward her. She had a cordial relationship to Madame de Maintenon.

Her husband was the lover of Françoise de Dreux who, during the Affair of the Poisons (1679–82), was convicted for attempted murder on Anne de Richelieu.

In 1679, she resigned from her office as the Première dame d'honneur because she was appointed to the same post at the court of the new Dauphine, awaiting her arrival, with her spouse being appointed chamberlain, Madeleine de Laval-Bois-Dauphin, Marechale de Rochefort as Dame d'atour, and Marguerite de Montchevreuil as the governess of the Dauphines maids-of-honour. The position proved not to be difficult, since the dauphine preferred not to participate much in court life.

Anne de Richelieu died in May 1684. Her court office was offered by the king to Madame de Maintenon, who refused it, an event which was a sensation at court and taken as a great sign of Maintenon's favor, since such an office would never have been offered to less than a duchess.

Court offices
Preceded by Julie d'Angennes	Première dame d'honneur to the Queen of France; 1671–1679	Succeeded by Anne-Armande de Crequy
