= Julie d'Angennes =

Duchess of Montausier

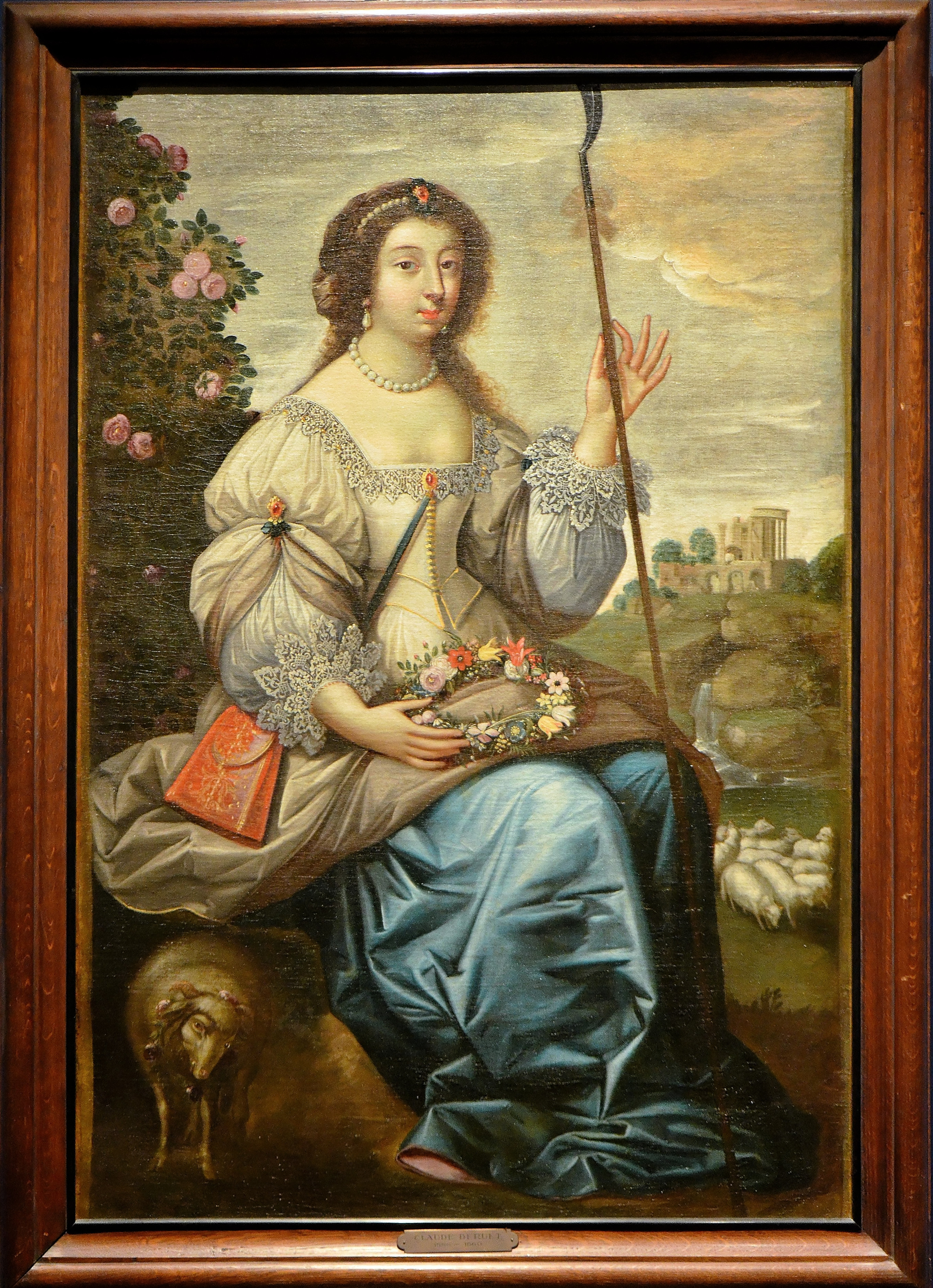
- Born: 1607; Paris, France
- Died: 15 November 1671 (aged 63–64)
- Occupations: Salonnière, lady-in-waiting
- Title: Duchess of Montausier
- Spouse: Charles de Sainte-Maure
- Children: Marie-Julie de Sainte-Maure
- Parents: Charles d'Angennes (father); Catherine de Rambouillet (mother)

Julie d'Angennes, Duchess of Montausier (1607 - 15 November 1671) was a French courtier. She served as royal governess of Louis, Grand Dauphin in 1661–1664, and Première dame d'honneur to the queen of France, Queen Marie Thérèse, from 1664 until 1671.

== Life ==
Julie d'Angennes was the daughter of Charles d'Angennes, Marquis of Rambouillet and Catherine de Vivonne, marquise de Rambouillet. She played an important role in the famous literary salon of her mother, where she was referred to as Princess Julie and was celebrated as a muse to writers and poets for her beauty and wit.

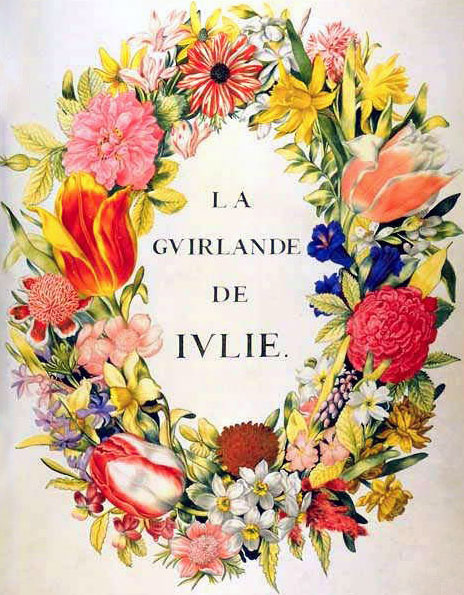
Title page of La Guirlande de Julie, 1641

The Guirlande de Julie (French pronunciation: [ɡiʁlɑ̃d də ʒyli], Julie's Garland) is a unique French manuscript of sixty-one madrigaux, illustrated with painted flowers, and composed by several poets habitués of the Hôtel de Rambouillet for Julie d'Angennes and given to her on her name day in May 1641. The 1641 manuscript was bought by the Bibliothèque nationale de France in 1989 and is now kept in the Département des Manuscrits of the BnF.

For her portrait, thought to be by Claude Deruet, of c. 1640, she posed as the shepherdess Astrea from the popular pastoral novel L'Astrée.

She married Charles de Sainte-Maure, duc de Montausier in 1645.
They had one daughter, Marie-Julie de Sainte-Maure, who married in 1664 with Emmanuel II de Crussol, Duke of Uzès, and had issue.

=== Court career ===
In 1661–1664, she was governess to the dauphin.

In 1664, she was appointed Première dame d'honneur to the queen. In this position, she is known for the complaisant role she played in assisting the king and his mistresses, though she officially stated her condemnation of the adultery.

During the trip to Flanders, she officially stated her shock at the behavior of Louise de La Vallière, when the affair between her and the king was exposed.

A scandal arose when Julie d'Angennes was accused of acting as a go-between between the king and Madame de Montespan in order to secure the governorship of the Dauphin for her husband. Julie d'Angennes was a personal friend of Madame de Montespan, and as they were both ladies-in-waiting, often shared sleeping quarters with her as the followed the royal court between the royal palaces. She shared her chambers with Montespan in Avesnes, when the king was known to visit Montespan in her bed chamber, and the affair between the king and Montespan started. An anonymous letter, which was sent to the queen, stated that the king was no longer in love with Louise de La Vallière but had begun an affair with Madame de Montespan, and that duchesse de Montausier was their accomplice. de Montausier successfully expressed her denial and rage on being accused of such a thing, and the queen stated that she refused to believe the letter.

She was blamed by Louis Henri de Pardaillan, Marquis of Montespan for assisting in the affair between the king and his wife, Madame de Montespan. In 1668, when her spouse was appointed governor to the dauphin, which was by some seen as payment for the role his wife played in the king's love life, the husband of Madame de Montespan stormed in to Julie d'Angennes and publicly blamed her for her role in the adultery of his wife. This scene deeply affected Julie d'Angennes, who was already suffering from nervous problems, and in late 1669, she announced her retirement from court service and left for the country, though an appointment for her replacement was not made until two years later.

Court offices
Preceded by Marie-Catherine de Senecey	Governess of the Children of France; 1661–1664	Succeeded by Louise de Prie
Preceded by Susanne de Baudéan	Première dame d'honneur to the Queen of France; 1664–1671	Succeeded by Anne de Richelieu
