= Anne Armande de Saint-Gelais =

French court official

Anne-Armande de Saint Gelais (1637–1709) was a French court official. She served as Première dame d'honneur to the queen of France, Maria Theresa of Spain, from 1679 until 1683.

== Life ==
Anne Armande de Saint Gelais was the daughter of Councillor Gilles de Saint Gelais, Marquis of Lansac and of Ballon, and Marie de La Vallée, and married duke Charles III de Créquy in 1653.

In 1679, she was appointed to the office of Première dame d'honneur to the new queen of France, and as such responsible for the female courtiers, controlling the budget, purchases, annual account and staff list, daily routine and presentations to the queen. She was appointed because of the rank of her spouse, when her predecessor was transferred to the household of the new dauphine by recommendation of madame de Maintenon. Anne-Armande de Crequy is described as a meek and pious beauty who avoided all conflicts and was treated with respect and consideration by most people at court. When she became a widow in 1687, she left court and lived the rest of her life in secluded retirement in the country.

Anne-Armande de Crequy is mentioned in the memoirs of the time.

Court offices
Preceded by Anne de Richelieu	Première dame d'honneur to the Queen of France; 1679–1683	Succeeded by Catherine-Charlotte de Boufflers
