= Gilles de Souvré, Marquis de Courtanvaux =

French nobleman (c. 1540–1626)

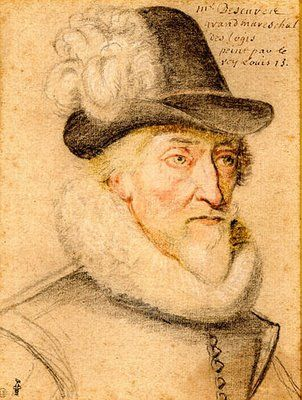
Gilles de Courtenvaux de Souvré

Gilles de Souvré, Marquis de Courtanvaux, Baron de Lezines (c. 1540–1626), marshal of France, belonged to an old family of the Perche.

He accompanied the duke of Anjou to Poland in 1573, and was appointed master of the wardrobe and captain of Vincennes when Anjou became Henri III. He remained in favour, despite the opposition of the queen mother, Catherine de' Medici, fought at Contras, defended Tours against the Leaguers, was named chévalier de Saint Esprit and governor of Touraine (1585), and was one of the first to recognize Henri IV (1589), who subsequently entrusted him with the education of the dauphin. Louis XIII rewarded him with the title of marshal in 1613. He died in Paris in 1626.

== Marriage and children ==
He married on 9 May 1582 Françoise de Bailleul, daughter of Jean de Bailleul, sieur de Renouard, baron de Messey.
They had 7 children :

- Jean de Souvré, Marquis of Courtanvaux, Knight of the King's Orders, Governor of Touraine
- René de Souvré, Lord of Renouard, Baron of Messey, Knight of the King's Orders.
- Gilles de Souvré, Bishop of Comminges (1614–1623), then of Auxerre (1625–1631)
- Jacques de Souvré, Knight of Malta, Grand Priory of France
- Françoise, governess to the Dauphin
- Madeleine de Souvré, marquise de Sablé, held a literary salon
- Anne, abbess of Préaux (1620-1633), then of Saint-Amand (1630-1651).
