= Charlotte de Lannoy =

French court official

Charlotte de Lannoy (d. September 1626) was a French court official. She served as Première dame d'honneur to the queen of France, Anne of Austria, from 1624 until 1626.

== Life ==
Charlotte de Lannoy was the daughter of Christophe, seigneur de Lannoy, gouverneur de Montreuil.

She was appointed to the head of queen Anne's household by Cardinal de Richelieu, to whom she was loyal, and her appointment was therefore not well seen by the queen. de Lannoy, who was described as a "respectable matron", was in service during the famous incident during the journey of the court to the coast in 1625, when the queen was famously courted by George Villiers, 1st Duke of Buckingham, a courtship which de Lannoy attempted to prevent and left a report on to the king.

== Portrayals in Fiction ==
Madame de Lannoy is mentioned by Alexandre Dumas in his novel The Three Musketeers as an informer or spy of Cardinal Richelieu among Queen Anne's ladies in waiting. She is the one who informs Rochefort about the Queen giving the Duke of Buckingham her diamonds.

Madame de Lannoy is portrayed by an un-credited actress in the 1920 re-release of the 1916 film D'Artagnan as The Three Musketeers. In the 1954 British television miniseries The Three Musketeers directed by Rex Tucker, she was portrayed by Margaret Gordon. Madame de Lannoy is played by Malka Ribowska in the 1961 French film The Three Musketeers (French: Les trois mousquetaires: Première époque – Les ferrets de la reine).

Court offices
Preceded by Laurence de Montmorency (With Inés de la Torre)	Première dame d'honneur to the Queen of France; 1624–1626	Succeeded by Marie-Catherine de Senecey
