= Françoise Bertaut de Motteville =

French memoir writer (c. 1621–1689)

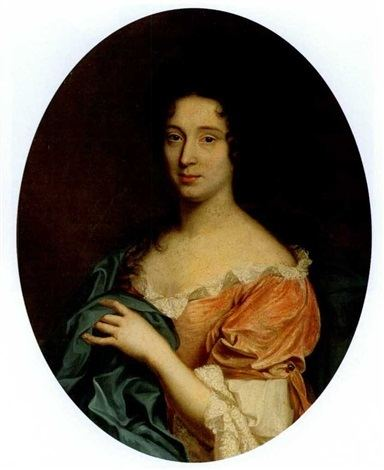
Françoise Bertaut de Motteville

Françoise Bertaut de Motteville (c. 1621 – 1689) was a French memoir writer.

== Biography ==
She was the daughter of Pierre Bertaut, a gentleman of the king's chamber, and niece of the bishop-poet Jean Bertaut.

Her mother, a Spaniard, was the friend and private secretary of Anne of Austria, wife of Louis XIII. At the age of seven Françoise was also made a member of the queen's household and given a pension. The influence of Cardinal Richelieu, however, who wished to separate the queen from her Spanish connections, exiled mother and daughter to Normandy, where in 1639 the young girl was married to Nicolas Langlois, seigneur de Motteville, president of the Chambre des Comptes of Rouen.

He died two years later at the age of eighty-two, and in 1642 the queen summoned Mme de Motteville to court, being now her own mistress by the death of Richelieu and Louis XIII. Through all the intrigues and troubles of the Fronde Mme de Motteville preserved the honourable reputation of being devoted to her mistress without any party ties or interests.

Some letters of hers are preserved, especially a curious correspondence with Anne, Duchess of Montpensier "La Grande Mademoiselle" on marriage, but her chief work is her Mémoires, which are in effect a history of Anne of Austria, written briefly till the date of Mme de Motteville's return to court, and then with fullness. They give a faithful picture of the life of the court at that time.

The best edition of her Mémoires is that of M. F. Riaux (2nd ed., Paris, 1891, 4 vols.), containing the essay by Sainte-Beuve from vol. v. of his Causeries du lundi. The Mémoires were translated into English in 1726 and again by KP Wormeley in 3 vols., 1902. For details concerning her family see Recherches sur Madame de Motteville et sur sa famille, by Charles de Beaurepaire (Rouen, 1900).

== Bibliography ==
- Mémoires pour servir a l'histoire D'ANNE D'AUTRICHE, Épouse de LOUIS XIII, Roi de France. Par Madame de Motteville, une de ses Favorites. A Maestricht, Chez Jean-Edme Dufour & Phil. Roux, Imprimeurs-Libraires, associés. M. DCC. LXXXII.
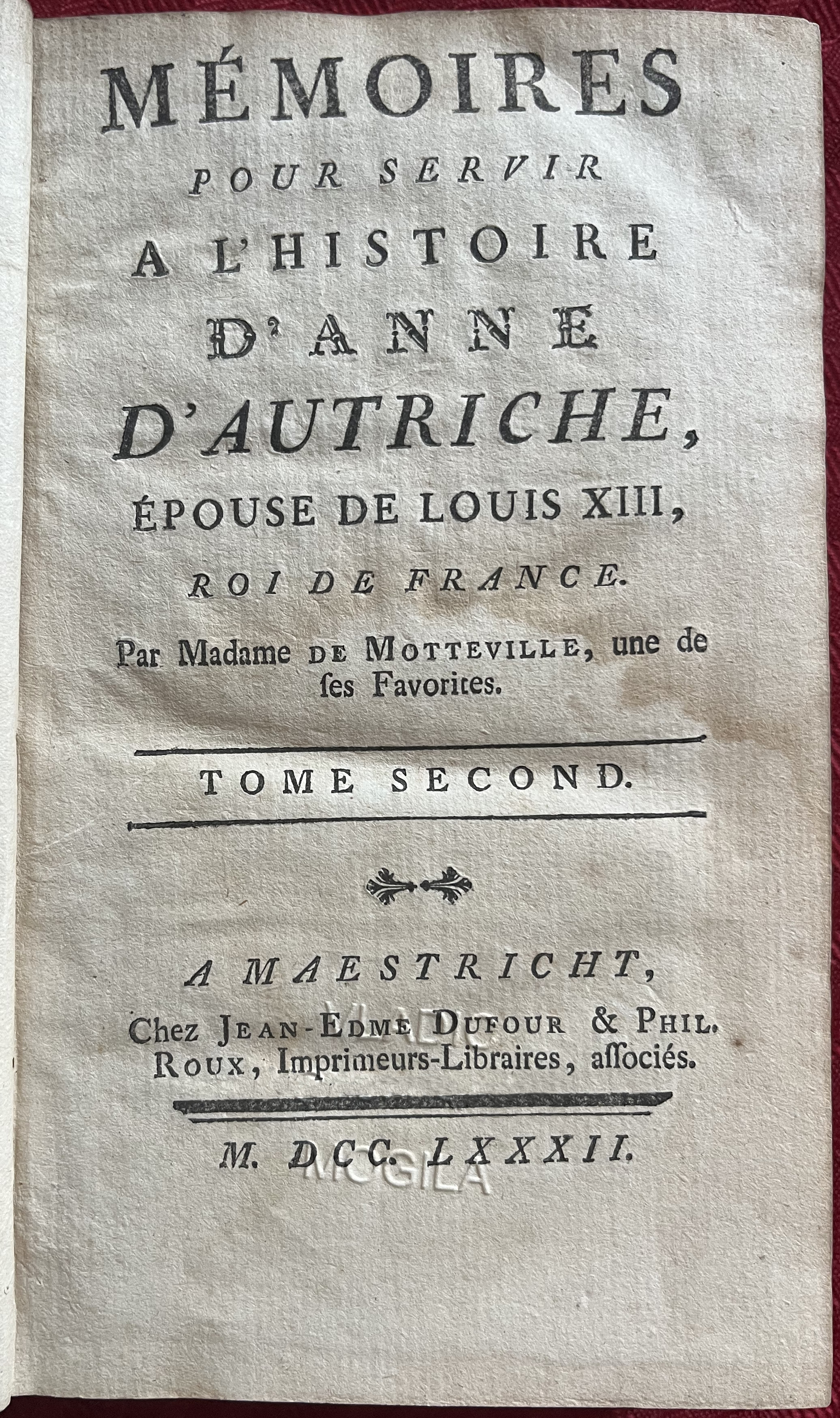
  Memoirs of Madame de Motteville
- Oliver Mallick, "Rien n'est permanent sous le ciel." Mme de Motteville am französischen Hof (1622-1666), in: Zeitsprünge, vol. 18, no. 3 (2014), p. 257-312.
- Jean-Pascal Gay, "Françoise de Motteville. Une expertise indéfinie ou comment ne pas être théologienne. Autour d'une "dissertation" féminine sur la divinité du Christ", in : Source(s), n°8-9, 2016, p. 39-73.
