= Pierre Broussel =

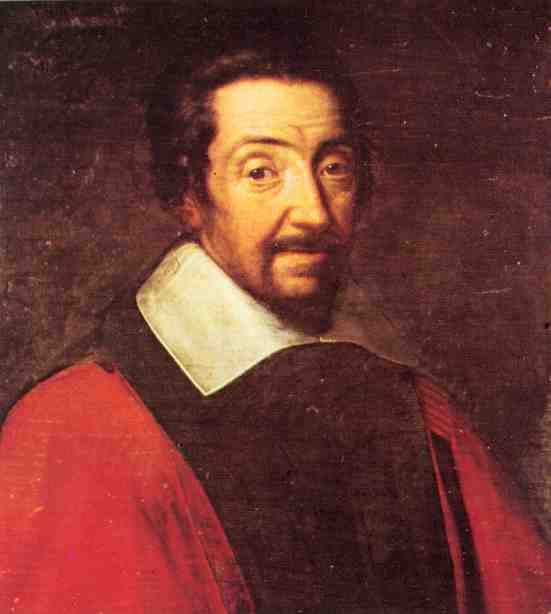

Pierre Broussel (c. 1575 – 27 August 1654) was a councillor in the Parlement of Paris under Louis XIII and Louis XIV, and later its president. He was a popular politician, in part due to his opposition to tax plans proposed by Cardinal Mazarin and his support for other legal reforms. Mazarin arrested him and a number of other members of the Paris Parlement for their politics on 26 August 1648. In response, the people of Paris rebelled and Mazarin was forced to free Broussel two days later. This insurrection touched off the first Fronde. Broussel was appointed Provost of the merchants of Paris (effectively, the mayor) in July 1652, but he resigned in September in order to make it easier to end the civil war he had helped to start.
