= Catherine de Sainte-Maure =

French courtier

- Countess of Brassac
- Full name: Catherine de Sainte-Maure
- Born: 1587
- Died: 1648 (aged 60–61); Paris, France
- Spouses: Jean de Galard de Bearn, Count of Brassac (1602)
- Father: François de Sainte-Maure, Baron of Montausier
- Mother: Louise Gillier

Catherine de Sainte-Maure (1587–11 May 1648) was a French courtier. She served as Première dame d'honneur to the queen of France, Anne of Austria, from 1638 until 1643.

== Biography ==
She was the daughter of François de Sainte-Maure, baron of Montausier, and Louise Gillier, and married to Jean de Galard de Bearn, comte de Brassac (d. 1645), in 1602. In 1638, the king and Cardinal Richelieu reorganised the household of the queen and replaced everyone considered disloyal to the king and the Cardinal with their own loyalists.

Consequently, Françoise de Lansac was appointed royal governess, and count of Brassac, and his spouse Catherine was appointed superintendent of the household of the queen and Première dame d'honneur respectively in order to keep the queen and her household under control.

When Queen Anne became regent in 1643, Catherine was replaced with Marie-Claire de Fleix.

Court offices
Preceded by Marie-Catherine de Senecey	Première dame d'honneur to the Queen of France; 1638–1643	Succeeded by Susanne de Navailles
Preceded by Marie-Catherine de Senecey	Première dame d'honneur to Anne of Austria; 1638–1643	Succeeded by Marie-Claire de Fleix
