= Anne of Austria =

Queen of France from 1615 to 1644

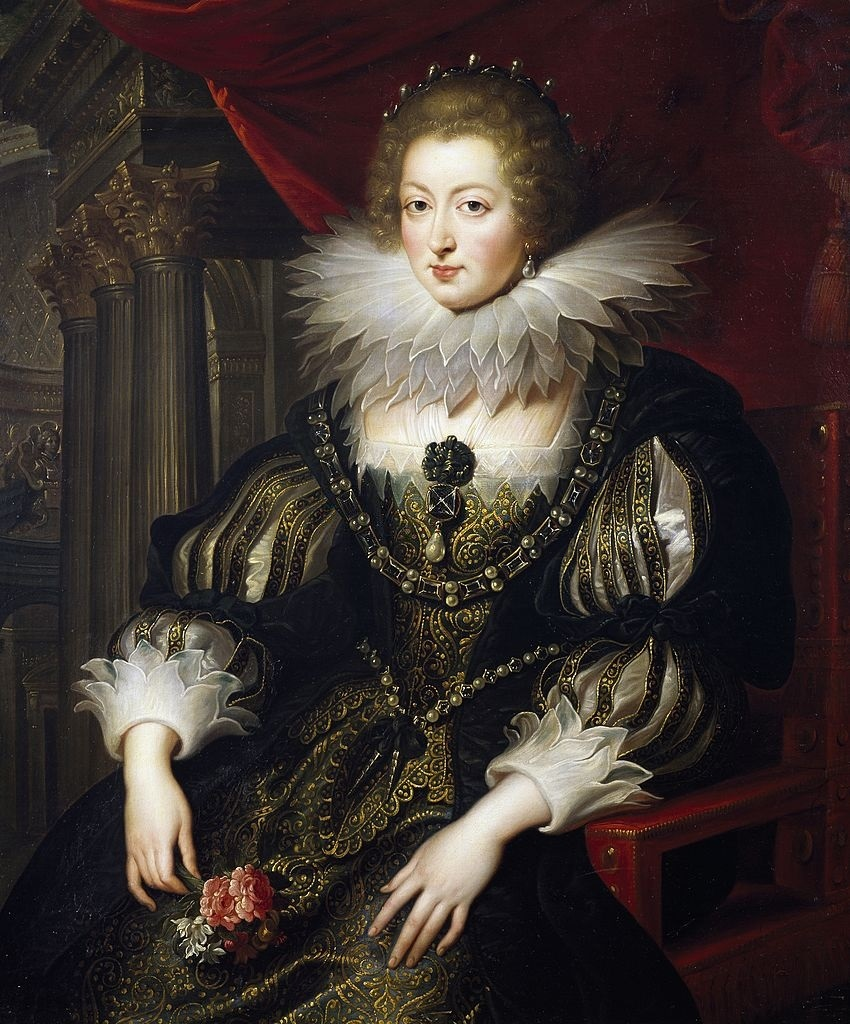
- Portrait by Peter Paul Rubens, c. 1620s

Queen consort of France
- Tenure: 24 November 1615 – 14 May 1643

Queen consort of Navarre
- Tenure: 24 November 1615 – 20 October 1620

Queen regent of France
- Regency: 14 May 1643 – 7 September 1651
- Monarch: Louis XIV
- Born: 22 September 1601; Benavente Palace, Valladolid, Crown of Castile, Spain
- Died: 20 January 1666 (aged 64); Paris, Kingdom of France
- Burial: Basilica of St Denis, Paris, France
- Spouse: Louis XIII (m. 1615; died 1643)
- Issue: Louis XIV; Philippe I, Duke of Orléans
Names
- Spanish: Ana María Mauricia de Austria y Austria; French: Anne-Marie-Mauricie d'Autriche
- House: Habsburg
- Father: Philip III of Spain
- Mother: Margaret of Austria
- Religion: Roman Catholicism
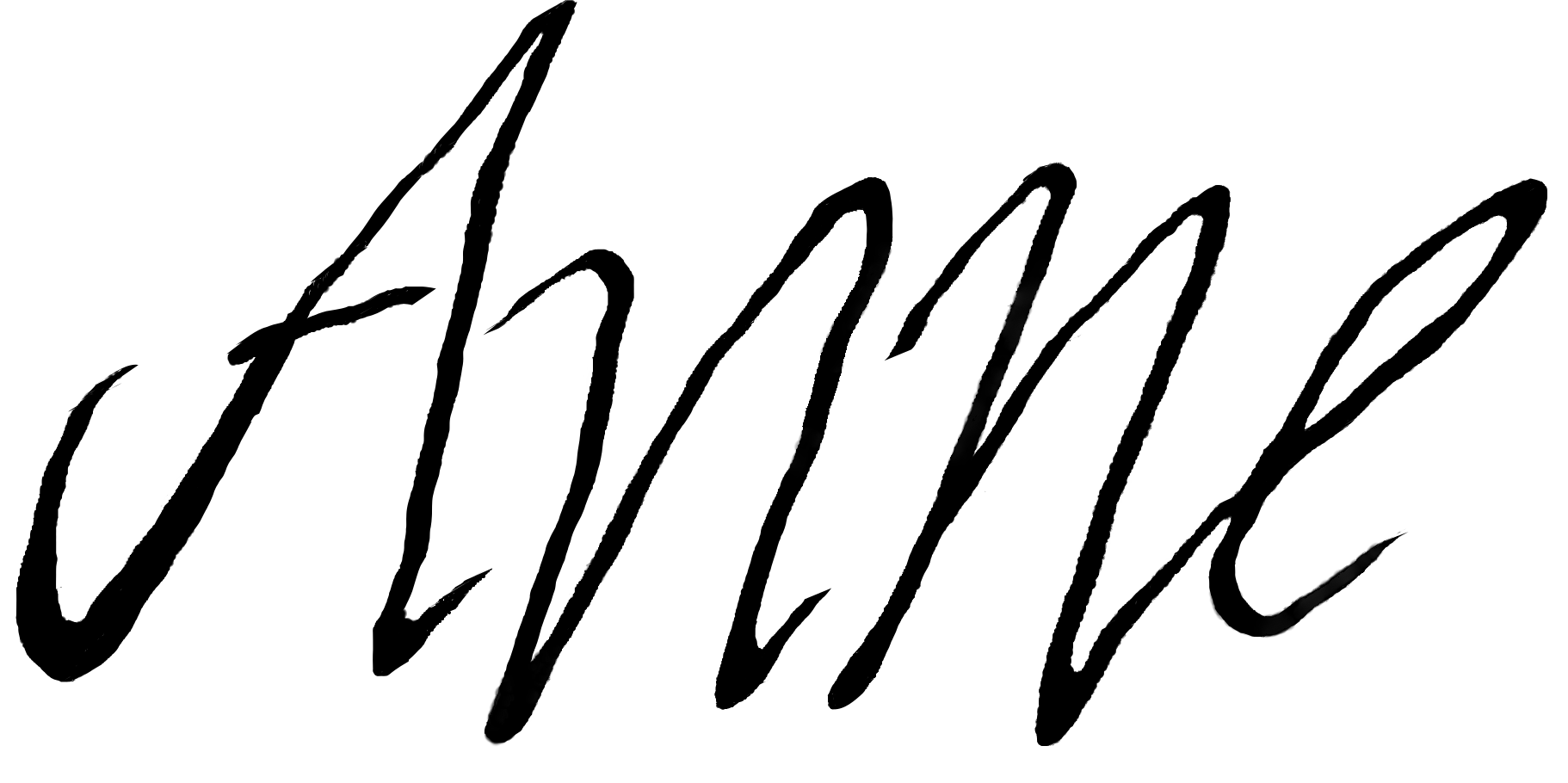
- Signature

Anne of Austria (French: Anne d'Autriche; Spanish: Ana de Austria; born Ana María Mauricia; 22 September 1601 – 20 January 1666) was Queen of France from 1615 to 1643 by marriage to King Louis XIII. She was also Queen of Navarre until the kingdom's annexation into the French crown in 1620. After her husband's death, Anne was regent to her son Louis XIV during his minority until 1651.

Anne was born in Valladolid to King Philip III of Spain and Margaret of Austria. She was betrothed to King Louis XIII of France in 1612 and they married three years later. The two had a difficult marital relationship, exacerbated by her miscarriages and the anti-Habsburg stance of Louis' first minister, Cardinal Richelieu. Despite a climate of distrust amidst the Franco-Spanish War and twenty-three years of childlessness in which she suffered five miscarriages, Anne gave birth to an heir, Louis, in 1638 and a second son, Philippe, two years later.

When Louis XIII died in 1643, Anne outmaneuvered her opponents to become sole regent to her four-year-old son, Louis XIV, and appointed Cardinal Mazarin as chief minister. The Fronde, a major revolt by the French nobility against Anne and Mazarin's government, broke out but was ultimately suppressed. In 1651, Anne's regency formally ended when Louis was declared of age. Accounts of French court life of her era emphasize her closeness to her son, and her disapproval of his infidelity to her niece and daughter-in-law Maria Theresa. She retired from active politics in 1661 and moved to the convent she had commissioned, Val-de-Grâce, where she died of breast cancer five years later.

== Early life ==
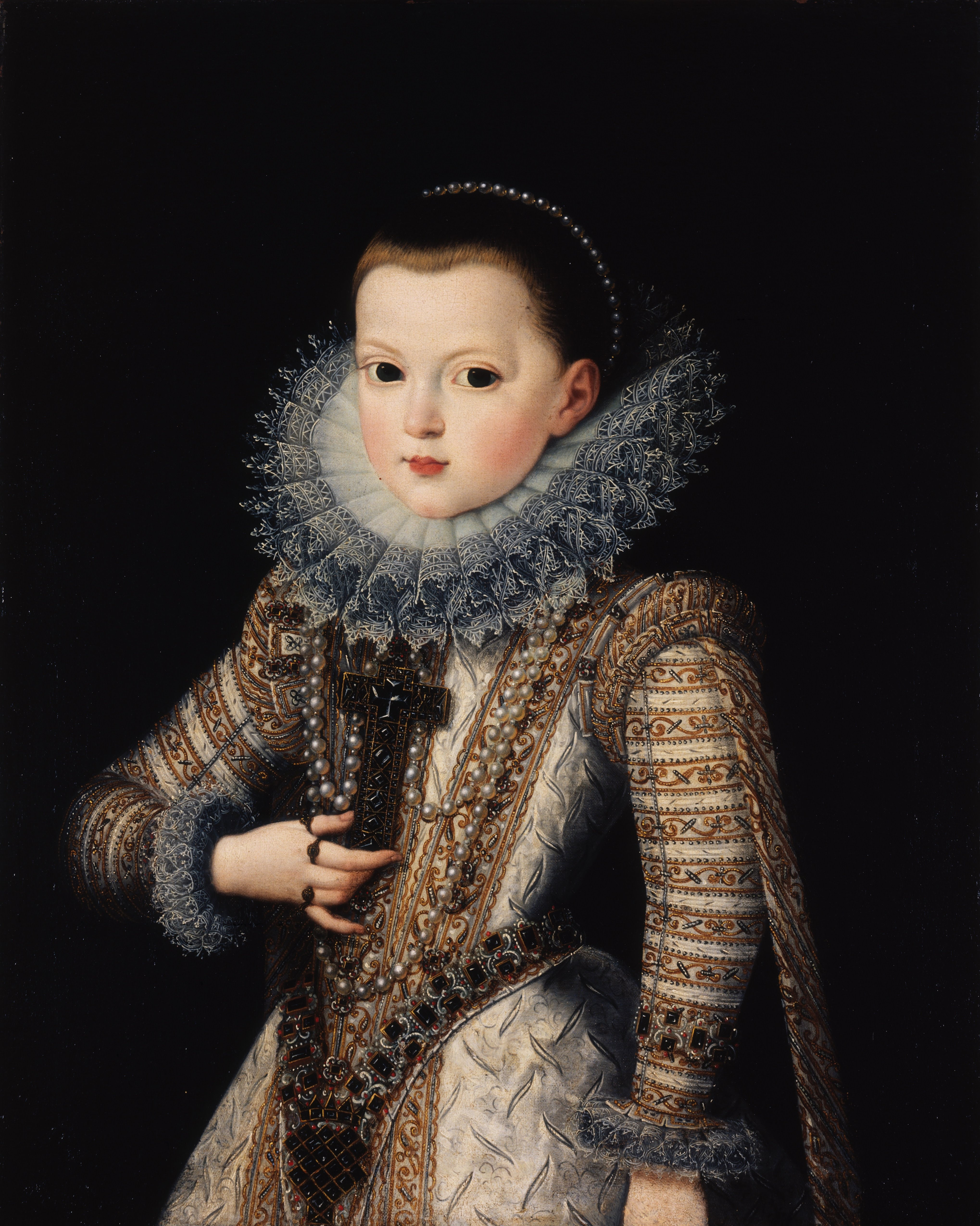
Anne at the age of six, 1607

Born at the Benavente Palace in Valladolid, Spain, and baptised Ana María Mauricia, she was the eldest daughter of King Philip III of Spain and his wife Margaret of Austria. She held the titles of Infanta of Spain and of Portugal (since her father was king of Portugal as well as Spain) and Archduchess of Austria. Despite her Spanish birth, she was referred to as Anne of Austria because the rulers of Spain belonged to the senior branch of the House of Austria, known later as the House of Habsburg, a designation relatively uncommon before the 19th century.

Anne was raised mainly at the Royal Alcázar of Madrid. Unusually for a royal princess, Anne grew up close to her parents, who were very religious. She was raised to be religious too, and was often taken to visit monasteries during her childhood. In 1611, she lost her mother, who died in childbirth. Despite her grief, Anne did her best to take care of her younger siblings, who referred to her with affection as their mother.

== Queen of France ==
At age eleven, Anne was betrothed to King Louis XIII of France. Her father gave her a dowry of 500,000 crowns and many beautiful jewels. For fear that Louis XIII would die early, the Spanish court stipulated that she would return to Spain with her dowry, jewels, and wardrobe if he did die. Prior to the marriage, Anne renounced all succession rights she had for herself and her descendants by Louis, with a provision that she would resume her rights should she be left a childless widow. On 18 October 1615, Louis and Anne were married by proxy in Burgos while Louis's sister, Elisabeth of France, and Anne's brother, Philip IV of Spain, were married by proxy in Bordeaux. These marriages followed the tradition of cementing military and political alliances between France and Spain that began with the marriage of Philip II of Spain to Elisabeth of Valois in 1559 as part of the Peace of Cateau-Cambrésis. Anne and Elisabeth were exchanged on the Isle of Pheasants between Hendaye and Fuenterrabía. She was lively and beautiful during her youth. She was also a noted equestrian, a taste her son, Louis, would inherit. At the time, Anne had many admirers, including the handsome Duke of Buckingham, although her intimates believed their flirtations remained chaste. Historian Desmond Seward alleges that during his 1625 visit to France, when the French court took official leave of the English embassy at Amiens, "Buckingham climbed into a private garden where the Queen was taking an evening walk", and "may even have tried to rape her", although "Anne's shrieks summoned her attendants."

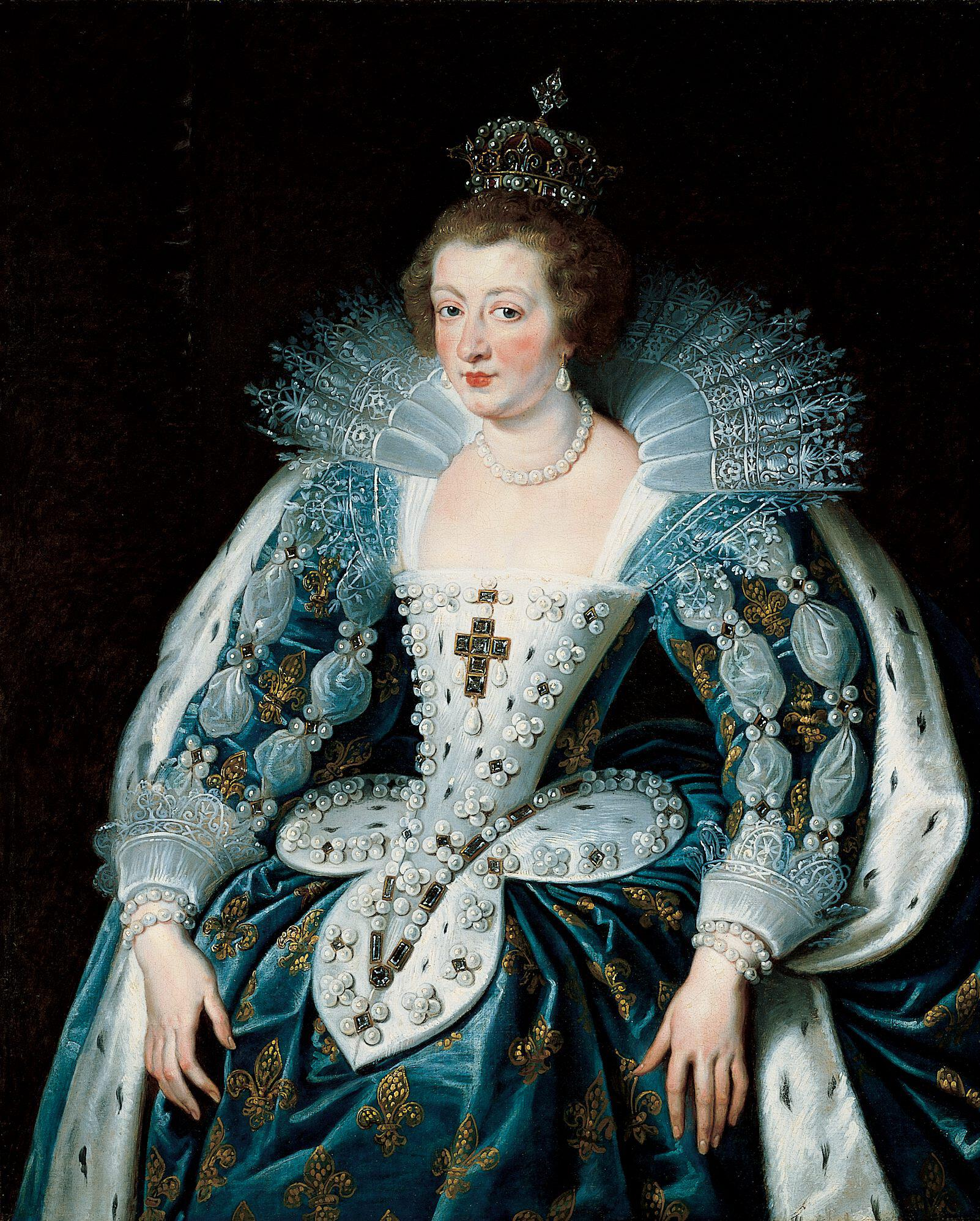
Anne of Austria, coronation costume, by Peter Paul Rubens

Anne and Louis, both fourteen years old, were pressured to consummate their marriage in order to forestall any possibility of future annulment, but Louis ignored his bride. Louis's mother, Marie de' Medici, continued to conduct herself as queen of France, without showing any deference to her daughter-in-law. Anne, surrounded by her entourage of high-born Spanish ladies-in-waiting headed by Inés de la Torre, continued to live according to Spanish etiquette and failed to improve her French.

In 1617, Louis conspired with his favourite Charles d'Albert de Luynes to dispense with the influence of his mother in a palace coup d'état and had her favourite Concino Concini assassinated on 26 April of that year. During the years he was in the ascendancy Luynes attempted to remedy the formal distance between Louis and his queen. He sent away Inés de la Torre and the other Spanish ladies and replaced them with French ones, notably the Princess of Conti (Louise Marguerite of Lorraine) and his wife Marie de Rohan, with whom he organized court events that would bring the couple together under amiable circumstances. Anne began to dress in the French manner and, in 1619, Luynes pressed the king to bed his queen. Some affection developed, to the point where it was noted that Louis was distracted during a serious illness of the queen.

A series of miscarriages disenchanted the king and served to chill their relations. On 14 March 1622, while playing with her ladies, Anne fell and suffered a very early miscarriage, around the sixth week of her pregnancy. Louis blamed her for the incident and was angry with Marie de Rohan, now the Dowager Duchess of Luynes, for having encouraged the queen in what was seen as negligence. The king's already strained relationship with the duchess worsened after the incident, leading him to demand her departure from the court. However, Rohan returned just a few months later with her new husband Claude, Duke of Chevreuse.

Louis turned now to Cardinal Richelieu as his advisor, who served as his first minister from 1624 until his death in 1642. Richelieu's foreign policy of struggle against the Habsburgs, who surrounded France on two fronts, inevitably created tension between Louis and Anne, who remained childless for another sixteen years.

Under the influence of Marie de Rohan, the queen let herself be drawn into political opposition to Richelieu and became embroiled in several intrigues against his policies. Vague rumours of betrayal circulated in the court, notably her supposed involvement, first, with the Chalais conspiracy that Marie organized in 1626, and then those of the king's treacherous favorite, Cinq-Mars, who had been introduced to him by Richelieu.

In 1626, the Cardinal placed Madeleine du Fargis as Dame d'atour in the household of the queen to act as a spy, but she was instead to become a trusted confidant and favourite of the queen. In December 1630, Louis XIII reduced Anne's court and purged a great number of her favourites as punishment for a plot in which the queen had cooperated with queen dowager Marie de' Medici in an attempt to depose Cardinal Richelieu, and among those fired were Madame de Motteville and Madeleine du Fargis. Queen Anne asked the Cardinal to intervene so that she might keep du Fargis. When he refused, she swore that she would never forgive him. Du Fargis left for Brussels, where her spouse had sided with the king's brother Gaston, Duke of Orléans against the monarch. After the invasion of Gaston in 1632, letters were discovered from du Fargis to people in Paris describing the plans of a marriage between Gaston and Anne after the death of Louis XIII. Anne was questioned and confirmed that the letters were written by du Fargis, but denied any knowledge of the plans.

In 1635, France declared war on Spain, placing the queen in an untenable position. Her secret correspondence with her brother Philip IV of Spain was not the only communication she had with the Spanish. She also corresponded with the Spanish ambassador Mirabel and the governor of the Spanish Netherlands. With the assistance of Anne's servant La Porte, who acted as courier, Madeleine du Fargis and Marie de Rohan acted as agents for her secret correspondence and channelled her letters to other contacts. In July 1637, Anne gave du Fargis the mission to examine whether there was any truth to the rumour of an alliance between France and England, as this would force Spain to cut off diplomatic connections to France and disturb her network of couriers between the Spanish embassies of Paris and Brussels.

On 11 August 1637, Anne came under so much suspicion that Richelieu issued an investigation. Her courier La Porte as well as the abbess of Anne's favourite convent Val-de-Grâce (where Anne had written many of her secret letters) were questioned and admitted to having participated in channelling the queen's secret correspondence. Anne initially swore on the Holy Sacrament that she had participated in no illegal correspondence, but finally admitted her guilt on 15 August. On 17 August, Queen Anne was forced to sign covenants regarding her correspondence, which was henceforth open to inspection; she was further banned from visiting convents without permission and was never to be left alone but was always to be in the presence of one of her ladies-in-waiting. This was soon followed up by a purge of her household, where those officials loyal to the queen were replaced by those loyal to the king and the Cardinal. Consequently, count Jean de Galard de Bearn de Brassac, known to be loyal to Richelieu, was appointed chamberlain of her household, and his spouse Catherine de Brassac replaced Marie-Catherine de Senecey as her Première dame d'honneur to keep the queen and her household under control.

=== Birth of an heir ===
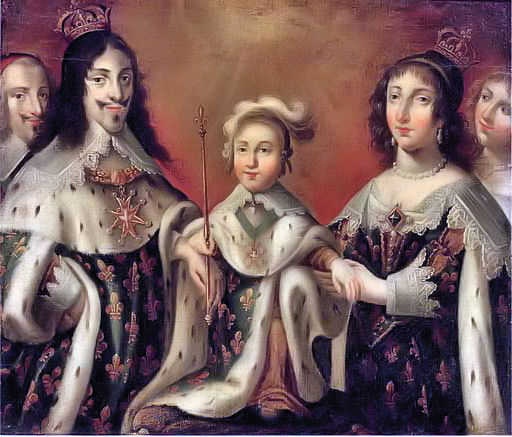
Louis XIII, Anne, and their son (the future Louis XIV), flanked by Cardinal Richelieu and the Duchesse de Chevreuse

They saw in the arms of this princess whom they had watched suffer great persecutions with so much staunchness, their child-King, like a gift given by Heaven in answer to their prayers.

— Madame de Motteville

Despite a climate of distrust, the queen became pregnant once more, a circumstance attributed to a single stormy night in December 1637 (Note: According to a contemporary account, on the night of 5 December 1637, the King was caught in a storm in the centre of Paris and was unable to reach his own bed, which had been arranged for him at the Condé estate in Saint-Maur, south-east of Vincennes. Cut off from his household staff, he was persuaded by the Captain of the Queen's Guard to spend the night at the Louvre; as a result, the King and Queen ate together and, since there was no royal bed available except the Queen's, slept together as well, resulting in Louis XIV's birth exactly nine months later.) or, as historians deem more likely, to a royal tour that occurred sometime during the previous month. (Note: The reliable La Gazette recorded that the royal couple lodged in St Germain from 9 November till 1 December 1637, before heading to Paris. On 2 December, the King travelled from Paris to Crosne—instead of Saint-Maur—whence he went to Versailles on 5 December while the Queen remained in Paris. Kleinman contends that the King might well have stopped over in Paris on his way to Versailles, but even if he had spent the night of 5 December with the Queen, it does not imply this was the first time they shared a bed since August. The Queen's doctor, Charles Bouvard, calculated that her pregnancy had begun at the end of November.) Louis XIV was born on 5 September 1638, an event that secured the Bourbon line. At this time, Anne was 37. The official newspaper Gazette de France called the birth "a marvel when it was least expected".

The birth of a living son failed to re-establish confidence between the royal couple. However, she conceived again fifteen months later. At Saint-Germain-en-Laye on 21 September 1640, Anne gave birth to her second son, Philippe I, Duke of Orléans, who later founded the modern House of Orléans. Both of her children were taken from her soon after birth and placed under the supervision of the royal governess Françoise de Lansac, who was disliked by Anne and loyal to the king and the cardinal.

Richelieu made Louis XIII a gift of his palatial hôtel, the Palais Cardinal, north of the Louvre, in 1636, but the king never took possession of it. Anne left the Louvre Palace to install herself there with her two small sons and remained as regent, hence the name Palais-Royal that the structure still carries.

=== Issue ===
The couple had the following children:

Name	Lifespan	Notes
stillborn child	December 1619	
miscarriage	Spring 1621	
miscarriage	14 March 1622	
miscarriage	November 1626	
miscarriage	April 1631	
Louis XIV	5 September 1638 – 1 September 1715	Married Maria Theresa of Austria (1638–1683) in 1660. Had issue. In 1683 morganatically married his last maîtresse-en-titre, Madame de Maintenon (1635–1719), without issue.
Philippe of France, Duke of Orléans	21 September 1640 – 8 June 1701	Married (1) Princess Henrietta of England (1644–1670) in 1661. Had issue. Married (2) Elizabeth Charlotte, Madame Palatine (1652–1722) in 1671. Had issue.

== Regent of France ==
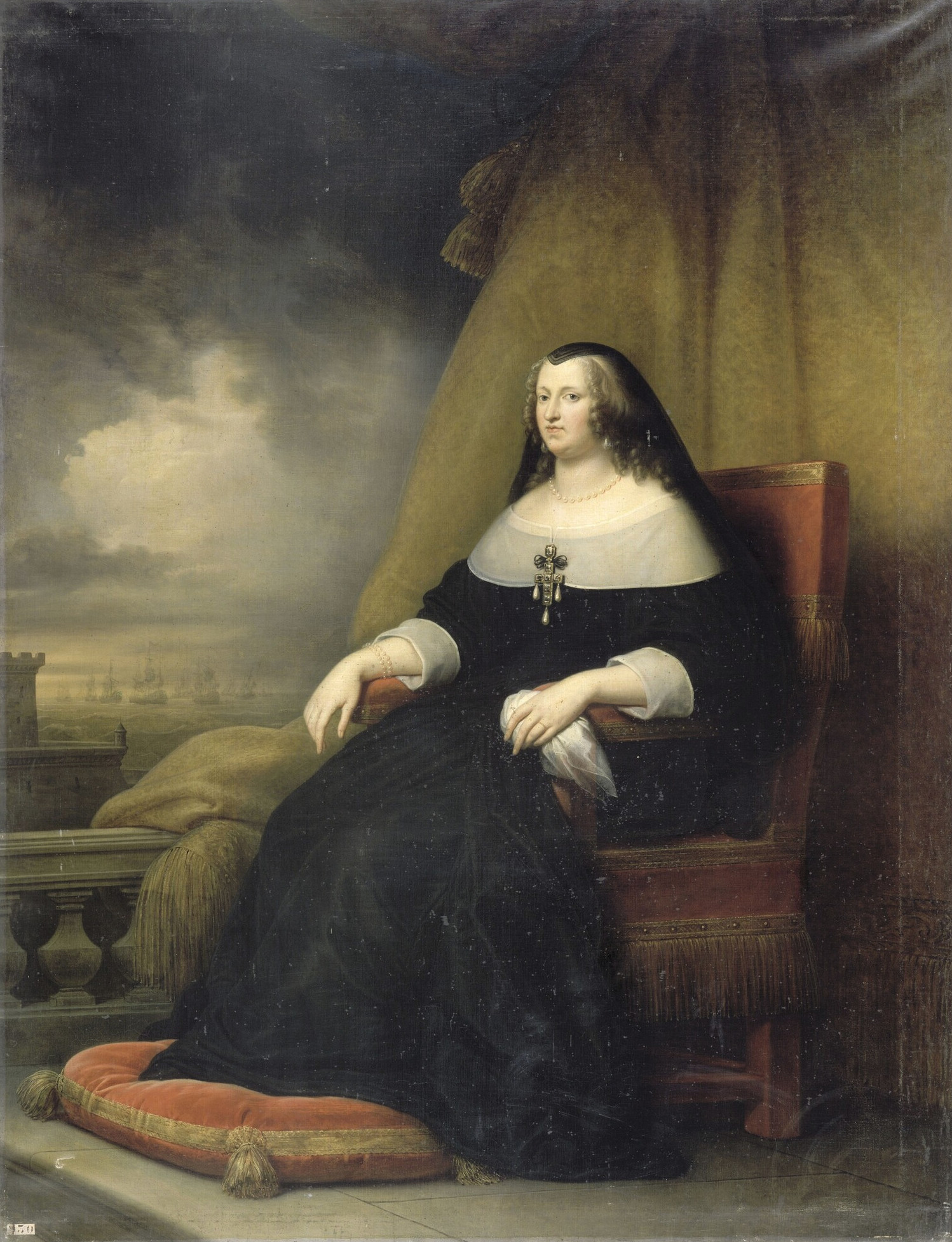
Anne of Austria as a widow, by Charles de Steuben, Versailles

Regency Period (1643-1651)

Upon Louis' death in 1643, Anne was named regent, despite his attempts to prevent her from obtaining the position. With the aid of Pierre Séguier, she had the Parlement of Paris revoke the will of the late king, which would have limited her powers. Their four-year-old son was crowned King Louis XIV of France. Anne assumed the regency but to general surprise entrusted the government to the chief minister, Cardinal Mazarin, who was a protégé of Cardinal Richelieu and figured among the council of the regency. The Queen had a particular dislike of de Chavigny, the other chief advisor chosen by Louis XIII. He had been close to Richelieu and was the only real rival in experience to Mazarin. The evening that she became regent, she declared that Mazarin would be her chief minister and head of her government. Mazarin took up residence at the Palais Royal near Queen Anne. Before long he was believed to be her lover, and, it was hinted, even her husband.

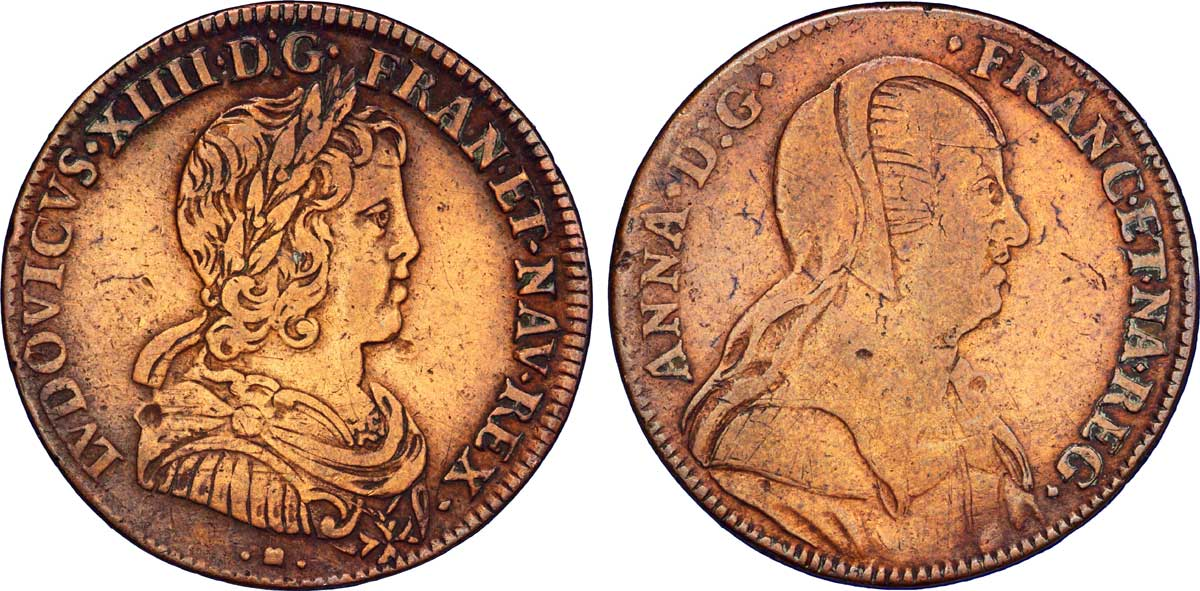
Token with the obverse bearing the effigy of Anne of Austria and the reverse that of Louis XIV, around 1643–1646

The best example of Anne's loyalty to France was her treatment of one of Richelieu's men, the Chancellor Pierre Séguier. Séguier had brusquely interrogated Anne in 1637 (like a "common criminal", as she recalled) following the discovery that she was giving military secrets to her father in Spain, and Anne was virtually under house arrest for years. By keeping the effective Séguier in his post, Anne sacrificed her own feelings for the interests of France and her son Louis.

The Queen sought a lasting peace between Catholic nations, but only after a French victory over her native Spain. Instead of making peace with her brother Philip, she continued the war against Spain after the French troops achieved a decisive victory at the Battle of Rocroi in the Ardennes on 19 May 1643. She also gave a partial Catholic orientation to French foreign policy. This was felt by the Netherlands, France's Protestant ally, which negotiated a separate peace with Spain in 1648. Realizing that she had a duty to leave her son a strong kingdom, she embraced the policy of weakening the House of Austria, a policy Mazarin continued following in Richelieu's footsteps. Mazarin also took charge of the young king's political and military education, while Anne reserved for herself the religious and moral education.

In 1648, Anne and Mazarin successfully negotiated the Peace of Westphalia, which ended the Thirty Years' War in which France had actively taken part to further its interests. Its terms formally confirmed the extensive autonomy that the various states of the Holy Roman Empire had enjoyed before the war. It granted Sweden seats on the Imperial Diet and territories controlling the mouths of the Oder, Elbe, and Weser Rivers. France, however, profited most from the settlement. Austria, ruled by the Habsburg Emperor Ferdinand III, ceded all Habsburg lands and claims in Alsace to France and acknowledged her de facto sovereignty over the Three Bishoprics of Metz, Verdun, and Toul. Moreover, many petty German states sought French protection, eager to emancipate themselves from Habsburg domination. This anticipated the formation of the 1658 League of the Rhine, which further diminished Imperial power.

As the Thirty Years' War came to an end, a civil war known as the Fronde erupted in France. It effectively checked France's ability to exploit the Peace of Westphalia. Anne and Mazarin had largely pursued the policies of Cardinal Richelieu, augmenting the Crown's power at the expense of the nobility and the Parlements. Anne was more concerned with internal policy than foreign affairs; she was a very proud queen who insisted on the divine rights of the King of France.

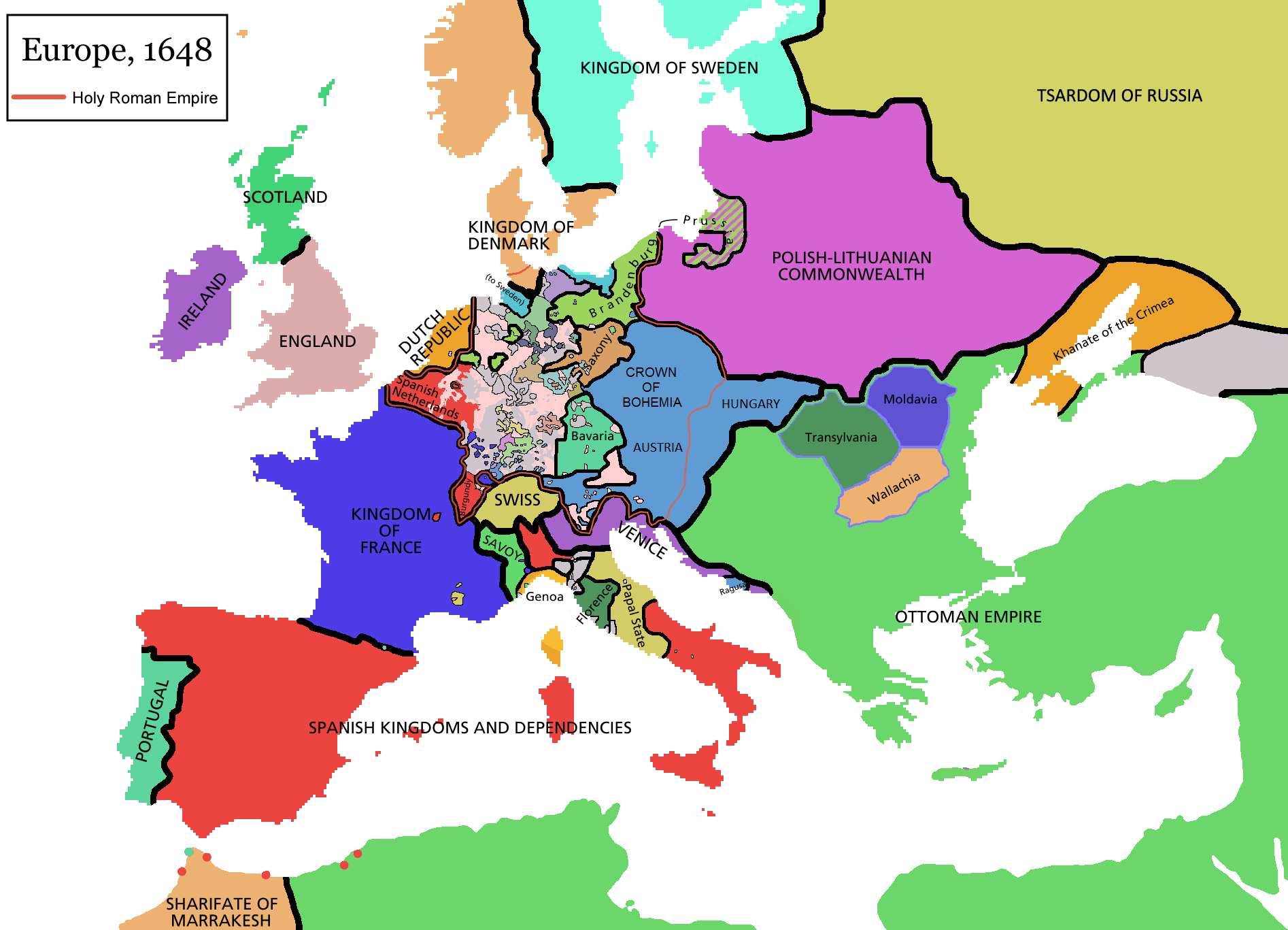
Europe after the Peace of Westphalia in 1648. Aftermath of the war made France as the most powerful nation in Europe.

Finding money was a primary preoccupation for Anne and the First minister Mazarin. Mazarin's new taxes on Parisians as per the decision of Anne had provoked the first Fronde, but the end of the Fronde did not resolve the problem. The government had borrowed huge amounts to finance the campaigns against the first Fronde and against Condé, and also had to pay for the continual travels of the Regent and the young King, and the elaborate festivities, parades, and cavalcades that accompanied their travel and every major event. The royal budget for 1653 was about 109 million livres, which amounted to eight hundred tons of silver or sixty tons of gold. Expenditures were the greatest between 1656 and 1659.

Twenty-seven agreements were made with bankers, who loaned the government 98 million livres to supplement the money collected through ordinary taxes. One effect of the enormous amount of money in the market during the period of the Regency of Anne and First Minister Mazarin was a decline in the value of the Livre tournois, the French royal unit of account, lost twenty percent of its value against the gold Florentine Florin coin. However, without the money lent by Nicolas Fouquet and other aristocratic financiers, Louis XIV could never have accomplished his early military and diplomatic successes.

In January 1648, while acting as regent, Anne received a request on behalf of artists who were affiliated with the crown or aristocracy. The artists, led by painter Charles Le Brun, wanted independence from the monopoly control of the guild of San-Luc, which fined the artists or seized their work. The painters and sculptors petitioned Louis XIV and the Queen Regent to form a new organization. They wanted to found an academy that would be for the visual arts what Académie Française was for French literature; this was to become the Académie Royale.

Revolts and Rebellions

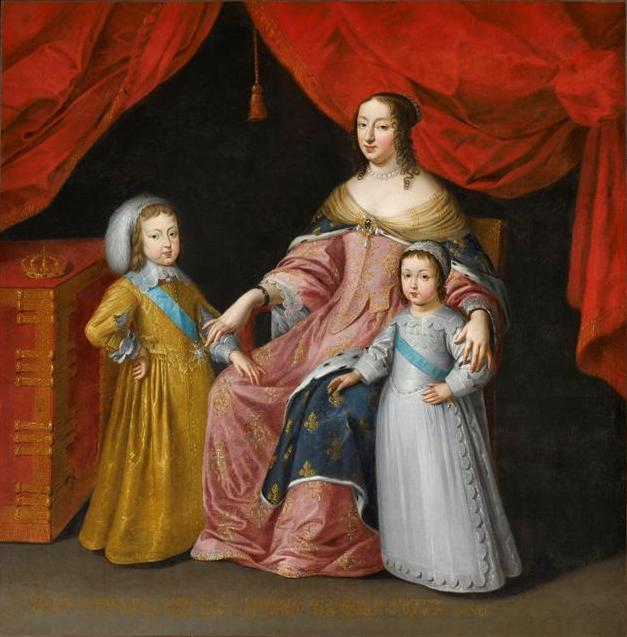
Anne of Austria with her children Louis XIV and Philippe of Orleans (unknown artist)

As the Thirty Years' War came to an end, a civil war known as the Fronde erupted in France. It effectively checked France's ability to exploit the Peace of Westphalia. Anne and Mazarin had largely pursued the policies of Cardinal Richelieu, augmenting the Crown's power at the expense of the nobility and the Parlements. Anne was more concerned with internal policy than foreign affairs; she was a very proud queen who insisted on the divine rights of the King of France.

All this led her to advocate a forceful policy in all matters relating to the King's authority, in a manner that was much more radical than the one proposed by Mazarin. The Cardinal depended totally on Anne's support and had to use all his influence on the Queen to temper some of her radical actions. Anne imprisoned any aristocrat or member of parliament who challenged her will; her main aim was to transfer to her son an absolute authority in the matters of finance and justice. One of the leaders of the Parlement of Paris, whom she had jailed, died in prison.

The Frondeurs, political heirs of the disaffected feudal aristocracy, sought to protect their traditional feudal privileges from the increasingly centralized royal government. Furthermore, they believed their traditional influence and authority was being usurped by the recently ennobled bureaucrats (the Noblesse de Robe, or "nobility of the robe"), who administered the kingdom and on whom the monarchy increasingly began to rely. This belief intensified the nobles' resentment.

In 1648, Anne and Mazarin attempted to tax members of the Parlement de Paris. The members refused to comply and ordered all of the king's earlier financial edicts burned. Buoyed by the victory of Louis, duke of Enghien (later known as le Grand Condé) at the Battle of Lens, Mazarin, on Queen Anne's insistence, arrested certain members in a show of force. The most important arrest, from Anne's point of view, concerned Pierre Broussel, one of the most important leaders in the Parliament of Paris. In Paris, the members of the parlement called a special session to debate Mazarin's measures. The meeting was forbidden by Anne as Regent, but went ahead anyway. The parlement issued a charter, inspired by the writ of Habeas Corpus in England, which revoked the authority of the King's justice officials, forbade any new taxes without the approval of the parlement, and declared that no royal subjects could be imprisoned without due process of law.

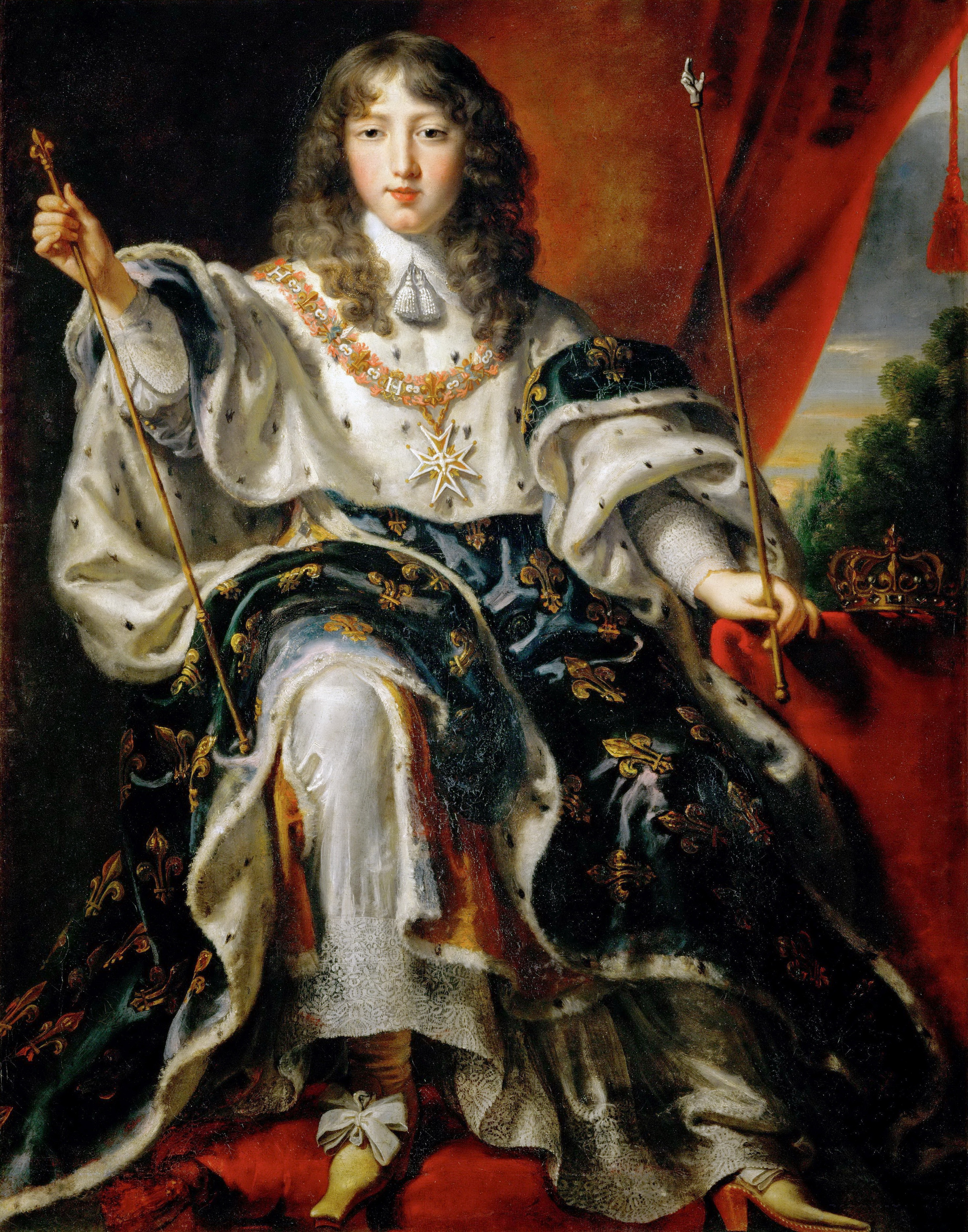
Portrait of young Louis XIV by Justus van Egmont between the years 1649–1652

Mazarin recommended to the Queen that she listen to the parlement and modify her decrees, but she was furious at their opposition. She waited until the right moment to strike back. The occasion she chose was the celebration of a major victory of the French Army over the Spanish at the Battle of Lens in Belgium on 26 August 1648. On the day that a special mass was held at the Cathedral of Notre Dame de Paris to celebrate the victory, she gave orders to the Captain of her guards to arrest the leaders of the parlement, including the popular Pierre Broussel. News of the arrest quickly spread in Paris, and crowds came out into the street to protest and to build barricades. That evening Mazarin wrote in his journal, "the parlement has performed the functions of the King, and the people have deferred to it entirely."

People in France were complaining about the expansion of royal authority, the high rate of taxation, and the reduction of the authority of the Parlement de Paris and other regional representative entities. Paris erupted in rioting as a result, and Anne was forced, under intense pressure, to free Broussel. Moreover, on the night of 9–10 February 1651, when Louis was twelve, a mob of angry Parisians broke into the royal palace and demanded to see their king. Led into the royal bed-chamber, they gazed upon Louis, who was feigning sleep, were appeased, and then quietly departed. The threat to the royal family prompted Anne to flee Paris with the king and his courtiers.

Shortly thereafter, the conclusion of the Peace of Westphalia allowed Condé's army to return to aid Louis and his court. Condé's family was close to Anne at that time, and he agreed to help her attempt to restore the king's authority. The queen's army, headed by Condé, attacked the rebels in Paris; the rebels were under the political control of Anne's old friend Marie de Rohan. Beaufort, who had escaped from the prison where Anne had incarcerated him five years before, was the military leader in Paris, under the nominal control of Conti. After a few battles, a political compromise was reached; the Peace of Rueil was signed, and the court returned to Paris.

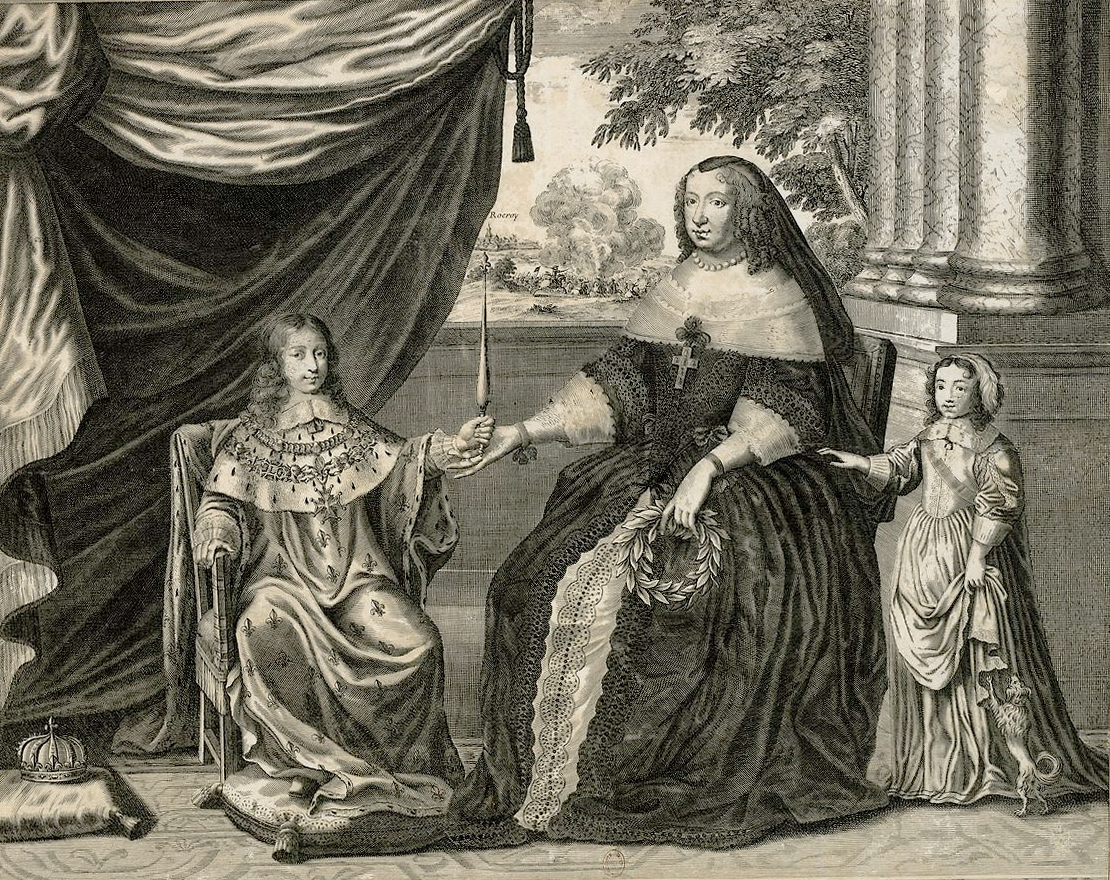
Engraving of Anne of Austria with her sons Louis XIV and Philippe I, Duke of Orléans

Unfortunately for Anne, her partial victory depended on Condé, who wanted to control the queen and destroy Mazarin's influence. It was Condé's sister who pushed him to turn against the queen. After striking a deal with her old friend Marie de Rohan, who was able to impose the nomination of Charles de l'Aubespine, marquess of Châteauneuf as minister of justice, Anne arrested Condé, his brother Armand de Bourbon, Prince of Conti, and the husband of their sister Anne Genevieve de Bourbon, duchess of Longueville. This situation did not last long, and Mazarin's unpopularity led to the creation of a coalition headed mainly by Marie de Rohan and the duchess of Longueville. This aristocratic coalition was strong enough to liberate the princes, exile Mazarin, and impose a condition of virtual house arrest on Queen Anne.

Just as the first Fronde (the Parliamentary Fronde of 1648–1649) ended, a second one (the Fronde of the Princes of 1650–1653) began. Unlike that which preceded it, tales of sordid intrigue and half-hearted warfare characterized this second phase of upper-class insurrection. To the aristocracy, this rebellion represented a protest for the reversal of their political demotion from vassals to courtiers. It was headed by the highest-ranking French nobles, among them Louis's uncle Gaston, Duke of Orléans and first cousin Anne Marie Louise d'Orléans, Duchess of Montpensier, known as la Grande Mademoiselle; Princes of the Blood such as Condé, his brother Armand de Bourbon, Prince of Conti, and their sister the Duchess of Longueville; dukes of legitimised royal descent, such as Henri, Duke of Longueville, and François, Duke of Beaufort; so-called "foreign princes" such as Frédéric Maurice, Duke of Bouillon, his brother Turenne (the Marshal of France), and Marie de Rohan, Duchess of Chevreuse; and scions of France's oldest families, such as François de La Rochefoucauld.

Faced with the revolt of Parliament, Anne of Austria was tempted to use force, but Mazarin advised her to be moderate. On January 1649, the queen mother and her 11-year-old son left the Louvre Palace through the Porte de la Conférence for Saint-Germain, allowing Condé to occupy the capital. The appeasement achieved by the Treaty of Saint-Germain, which was fragile and did not prevent the prince's revolt, followed by the alliance of the two Frondes, which triggered a civil war lasting until 1652. During this long conflict, Anne of Austria accompanied her son in an itinerant life, left to the vagaries of the countryside. She relied on Mazarin, whom she supported, including during his two self-imposed exiles, despite the humiliations and treacherous pamphlets that targeted him personally.

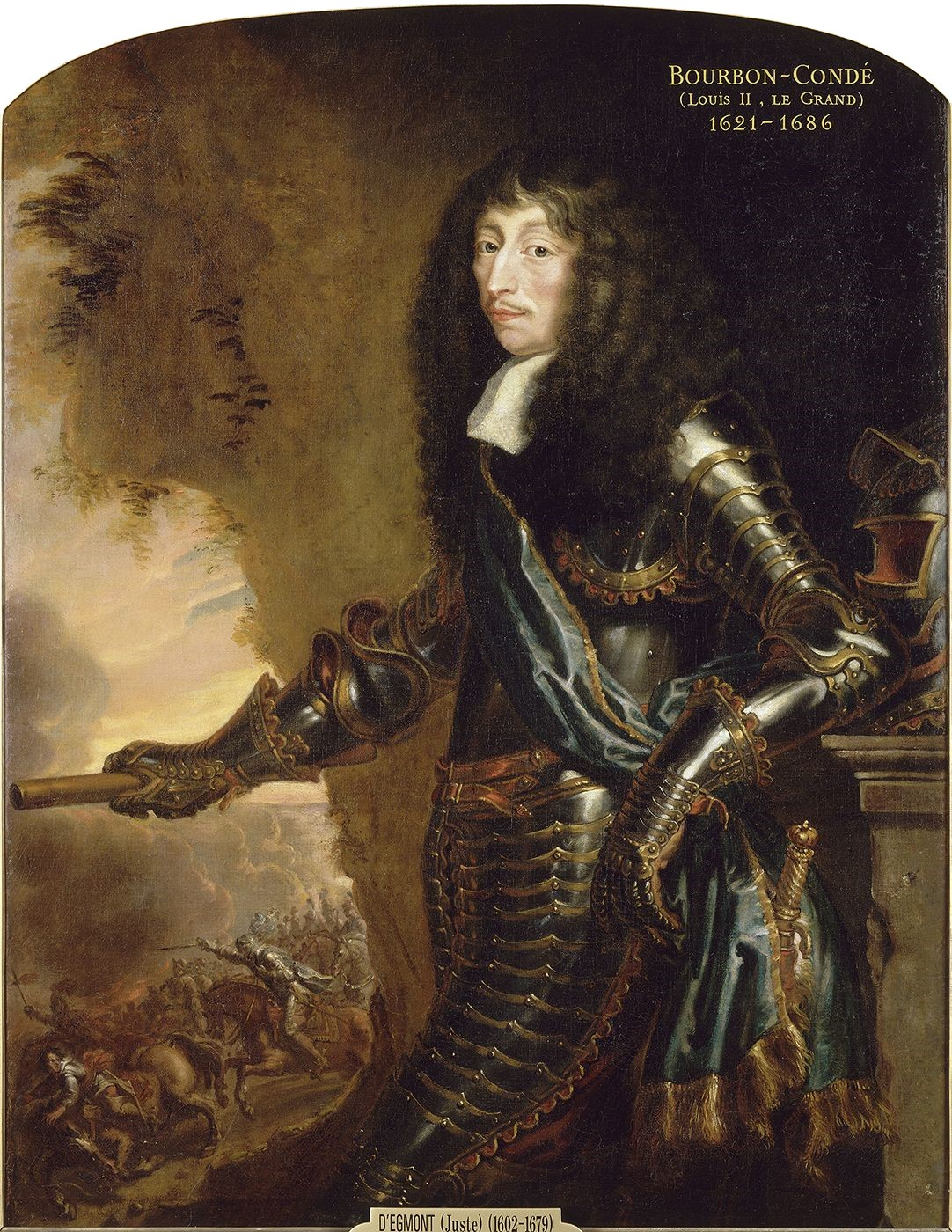
Louis the Prince de Condé, leader of the second Fronde

Queen Anne played the most important role in defeating the Fronde because she wanted to transfer absolute authority to her son. In addition, most of the princes refused to deal with Mazarin, who went into exile for a number of years. The Frondeurs claimed to act on Louis's behalf, and in his real interest, against his mother and Mazarin. Louis's coming-of-age and subsequent coronation deprived them of the Frondeurs' pretext for revolt. Louis XIV, now of age to claim his throne, re-entered Paris in October 1652, accompanied by his mother and by Turenne. Mazarin had to wait longer to make his return, which was carefully orchestrated with his help. The Parlement de Paris was first transferred by Anne of Austria from Paris to Pontoise, to see how many members would accept her authority. A majority appeared at the meeting. Following the prepared plan, the Parlement respectfully asked that Mazarin be dismissed, and Anne of Austria agreed. Mazarin, knowing this was the plan, accepted this decision, and waited a respectful time in exile. He made his return to Paris in February 1653. He was welcomed with a triumphal banquet at the Hotel de Ville, where crowds earlier had demanded his downfall.

During this period, Louis fell in love with Mazarin's niece Marie Mancini, but Anne and Mazarin ended the king's infatuation by sending Mancini away from court to be married in Italy. While Mazarin might have been tempted for a short time to marry his niece to the King of France, Queen Anne was absolutely against this; she wanted to marry her son to the Maria Theresa of Spain, daughter of her brother, Philip IV of Spain for both dynastic and political reasons. Mazarin soon supported the Queen's position because he knew that her support for his power and his foreign policy depended on making peace with Spain from a strong position and on the Spanish marriage. Additionally, Mazarin's relations with Marie Mancini were not good, and he did not trust her to support his position. All of Louis's tears and his supplications to his mother did not make her change her mind. The Spanish marriage would be very important both for its role in ending the war between France and Spain, because many of the claims and objectives of Louis's foreign policy for the next 50 years would be based upon this marriage, and because it was through this marriage that the Spanish throne would ultimately be delivered to the House of Bourbon.

== Later life ==
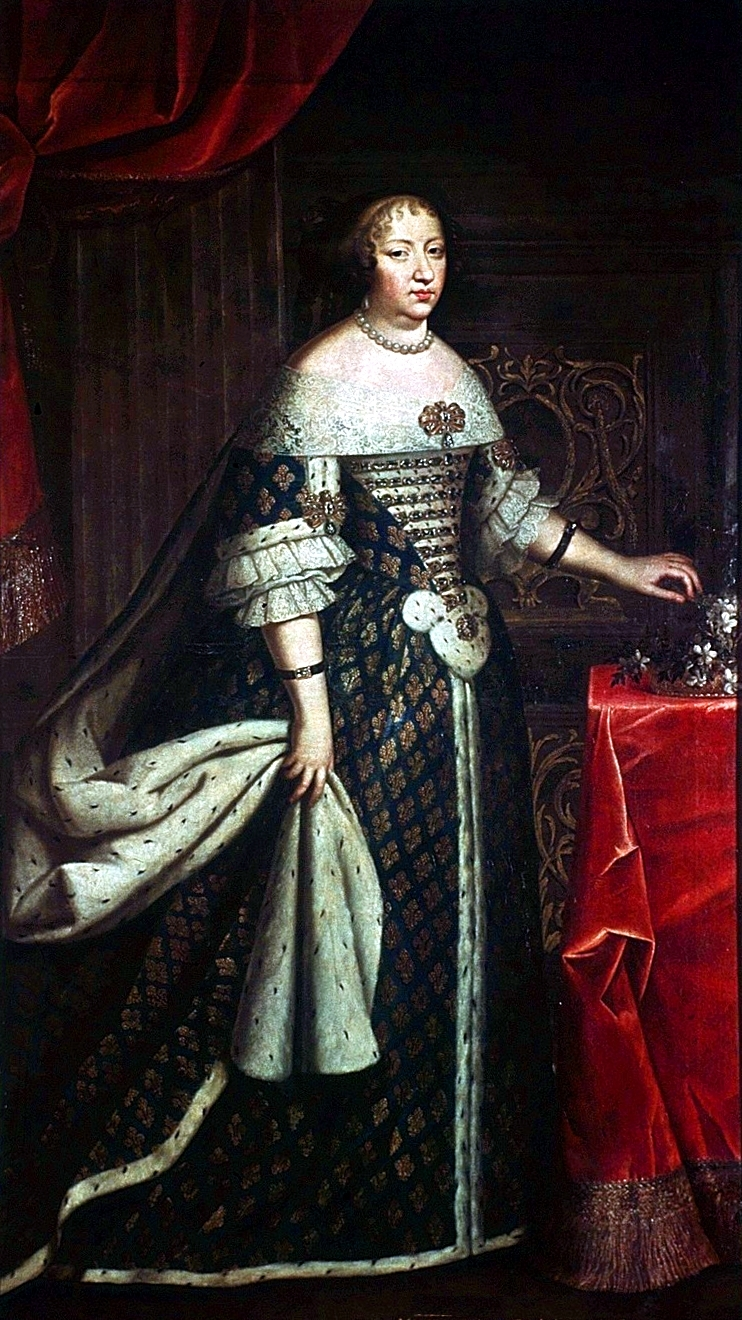
Final grand portrait of Anne of Austria, Charles Beaubrun

Anne's regency formally ended on 7 September 1651, when Louis XIV was declared of legal majority at the age of thirteen. The Fronde thus gradually lost steam and ended in 1653, when Mazarin returned triumphantly from exile. From that time until his death, Mazarin was in charge of foreign and financial policy without the daily supervision of Anne, who was no longer regent after 1651.

In 1659, the war with Spain ended with the Treaty of the Pyrenees. The following year, peace was cemented by the marriage of the young king to Anne's niece, the Spanish Habsburg princess Maria Theresa of Spain. In 1661, the same year as the death of Mazarin, an heir to the throne was born, Anne's first grandchild Louis. Many other children would follow, but all in the legitimate line would die except for Louis. Anne continued her role as the part of the government, managing the state affairs with Mazarin.

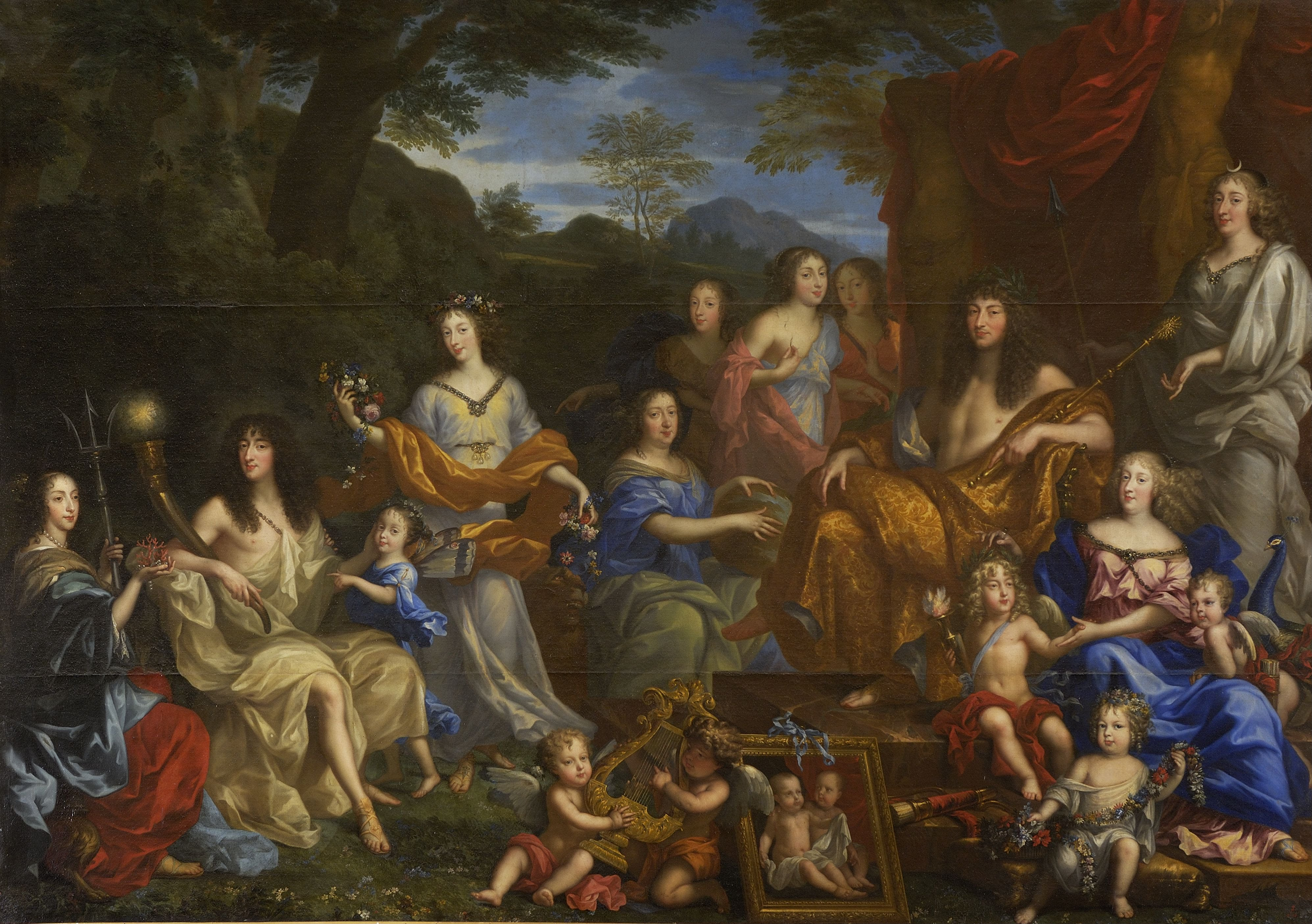
Family portrait of Louis XIV by Jean Nocret. Queen Anne is present at the center.

After the death of Mazarin in 1661, Anne started to withdraw herself from the politics and state administration and dedicated much of her time in palace and in the well being of the family, helping his son in the administration while also cherishing her new born grandchildren from both sons. Anne had a lump and pain in her breast since 1663, but didn't receive treatment until October 1664 when she started appearing jaundiced. Physician Antoine Vallot started treating her for breast cancer, which had spread to her liver and caused her jaundice. The medical knowledge at the time was that black bile was causing the cancer, so physicians treated her with bleedings, laxatives, lead, quicksilver poultice, astringents, and salves. After Vallot lanced open a tumor under her arm, she nearly died. Anne was quoted by Françoise Bertaut de Motteville as saying "Death is so close that when I see the end of another day it seems to me a miracle which I had not expected". She retired to the convent of Val-de-Grâce and died from her cancer on 20 January 1666.

== Conventual patronage and the Val-de-Grâce ==
As part of her role as a member of French royalty, Anne visited churches and convents across France, where she met Marguerite de Veny d'Arbouze at the Notre-Dame-de-Grâce de la-Ville-d'Evêque. As well as securing from the King the position of Abbess at the Benedictine Val-de-Grâce de Notre-Dame-de-la-Crèche for Marguerite in 1618, Anne purchased lands and transferred the convent to Paris in 1621. She was named the new foundress of the convent in the same year. Her patronage included the building of a small church and an apartment for herself between 1620 and 1625, against the wishes of both Louis and Cardinal Richelieu.

The Val-de-Grâce was commissioned by Anne in 1645, which was undertaken initially by Francois Mansart, who was dismissed in 1646 and succeeded by Jacques Lemercier. This church became Anne's main place of worship and would later gain dynastic significance during the Fronde when she was queen regent. In 1662, she acquired the heart of her ancestor, Anne Elizabeth of France, and placed it in the Chapel of Saint Anne. In 1666, Anne's own body was interred next to Louis XIII's at the Basilica of St Denis in Paris, but her heart in the Chapel of Saint Sacrament, alongside the body of Marguerite d'Arbouze.

== In fiction ==
She is one of the central figures in Alexandre Dumas's 1844 novel The Three Musketeers and its sequels Twenty Years After (1845) and The Vicomte de Bragelonne (1847–1850), and has thus been portrayed in numerous film adaptations.

Her lady-in-waiting Madame de Motteville wrote the story of the queen's life in her Mémoires d'Anne d'Autriche.

She was portrayed by Geraldine Chaplin in The Three Musketeers and The Four Musketeers.

She was portrayed by Meg Foster in The Man in the Iron Mask (1998).

She appears in a French film based on the life of Louis XIV, Le Roi danse, portrayed by Collette Emmanuelle, and King Louis portrayed by Benoît Magimel (2000).

She was portrayed by Alexandra Dowling in the BBC series The Musketeers (2014–2016).

She first appears as a character in the Dinosaur King season two episode "The French Conniption" as a young teen along with a young King Louis and others.

She appeared in Legends of Tomorrow's second-season premiere episode "Out of Time", played by Rebecca Roberts.

She appeared in final episode of the third season of series As If, played by Yeşim Ceylan.

She was portrayed by Vicky Krieps in the 2023 French film The Three Musketeers: D'Artagnan and The Three Musketeers: Milady.

Anne of Austria has a cameo in television series Versailles (season 1, episode 1).

== Ancestry ==
Ancestors of Anne of Austria

8. Charles V, Holy Roman Emperor
4. Philip II of Spain
9. Isabella of Portugal
2. Philip III of Spain
10. Maximilian II, Holy Roman Emperor
5. Anna of Austria (≠ 15)
11. Maria of Austria
1. Anne of Austria
12. Ferdinand I, Holy Roman Emperor
6. Charles II, Archduke of Inner Austria
13. Anne of Bohemia and Hungary
3. Margaret of Austria
14. Albert V, Duke of Bavaria
7. Maria Anna of Bavaria
15. Anna of Austria (≠ 5)

== Gallery ==
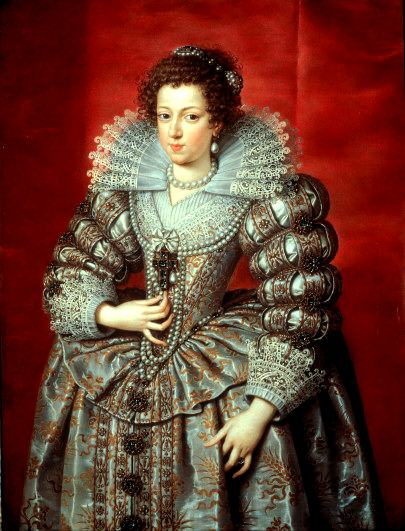
Portrait of Anne at the age of 15 by Frans Pourbus the Younger, c. 1616, (Staatliche Kunsthalle Karlsruhe)

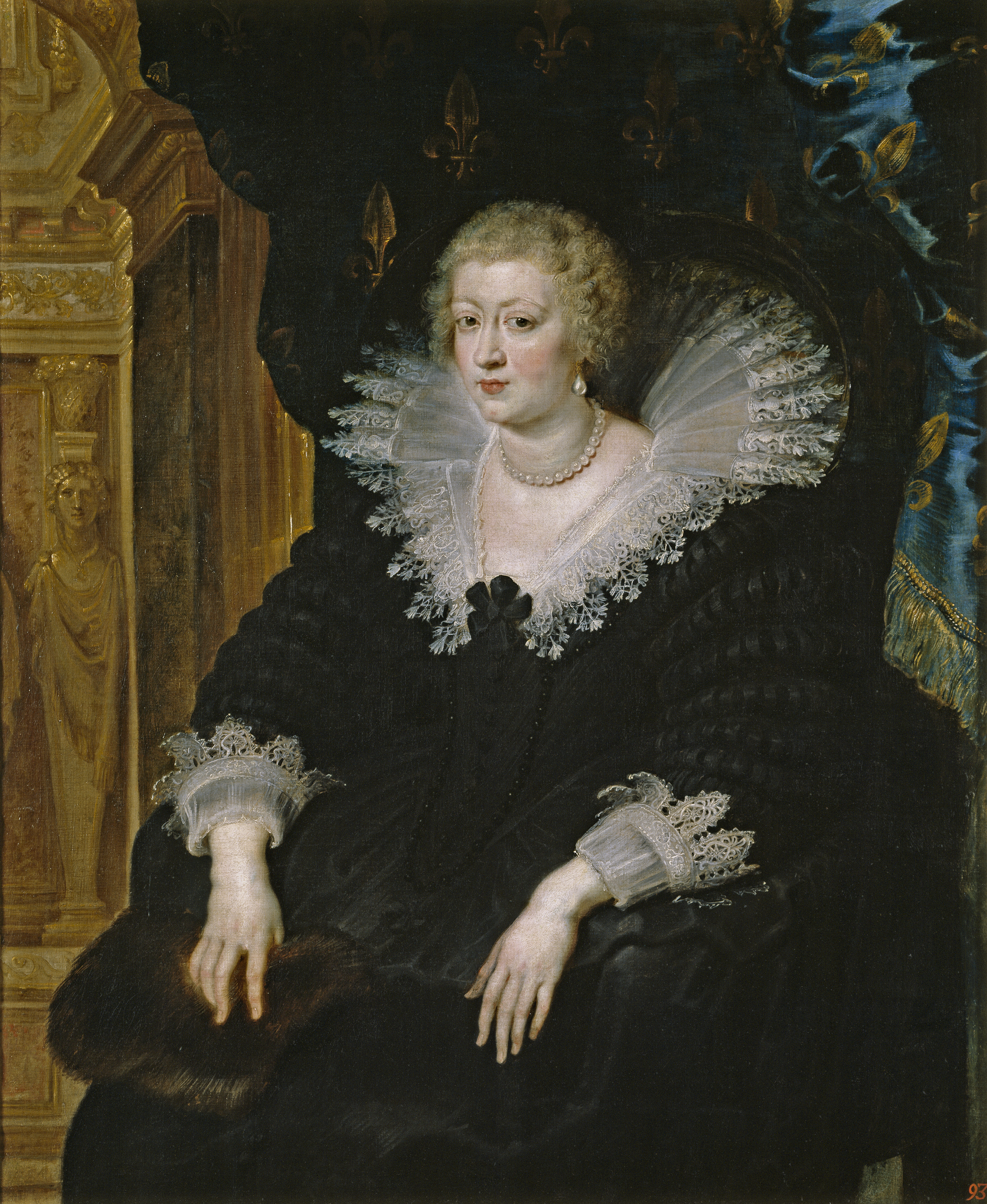
Anne of Austria, 1622, by Peter Paul Rubens (Prado)

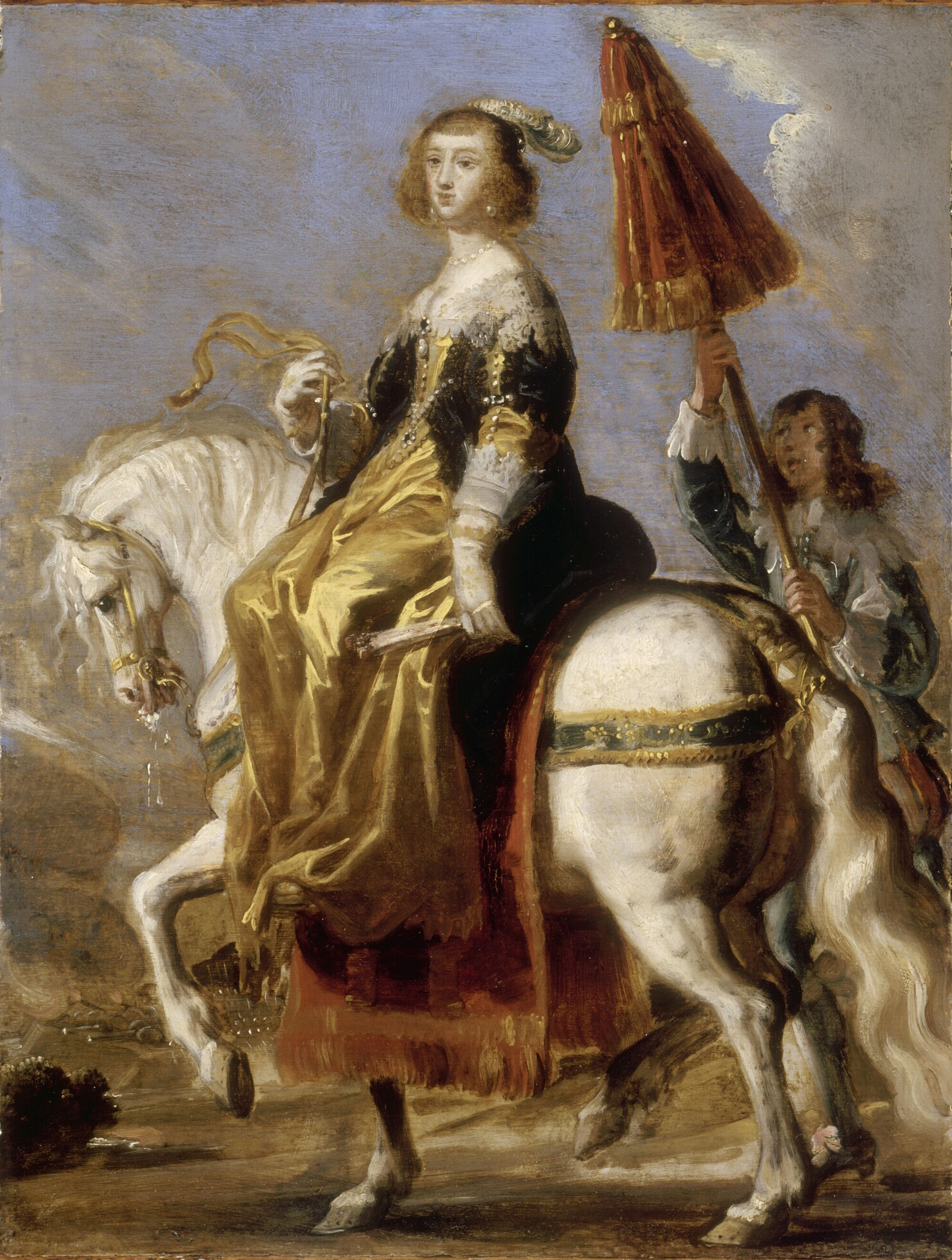
Equestrian portrait of Anne (Versailles)

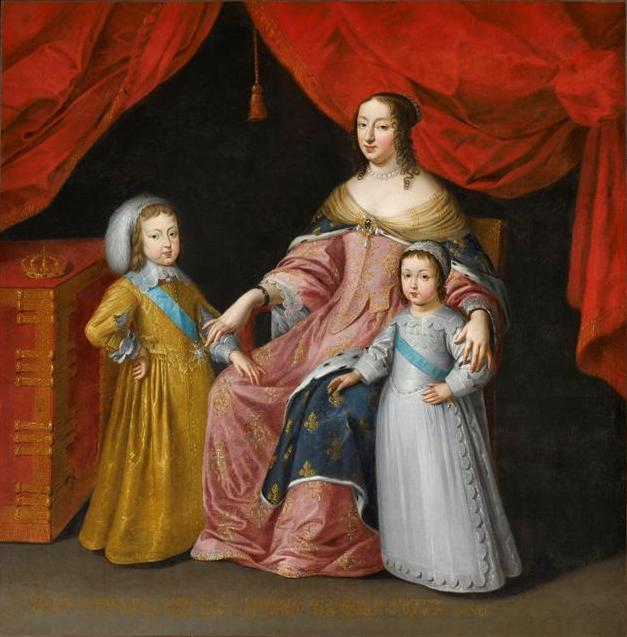
Anne with her sons, Louis and Philippe (Versailles Museum of French History)

Royal monogram as Queen of France

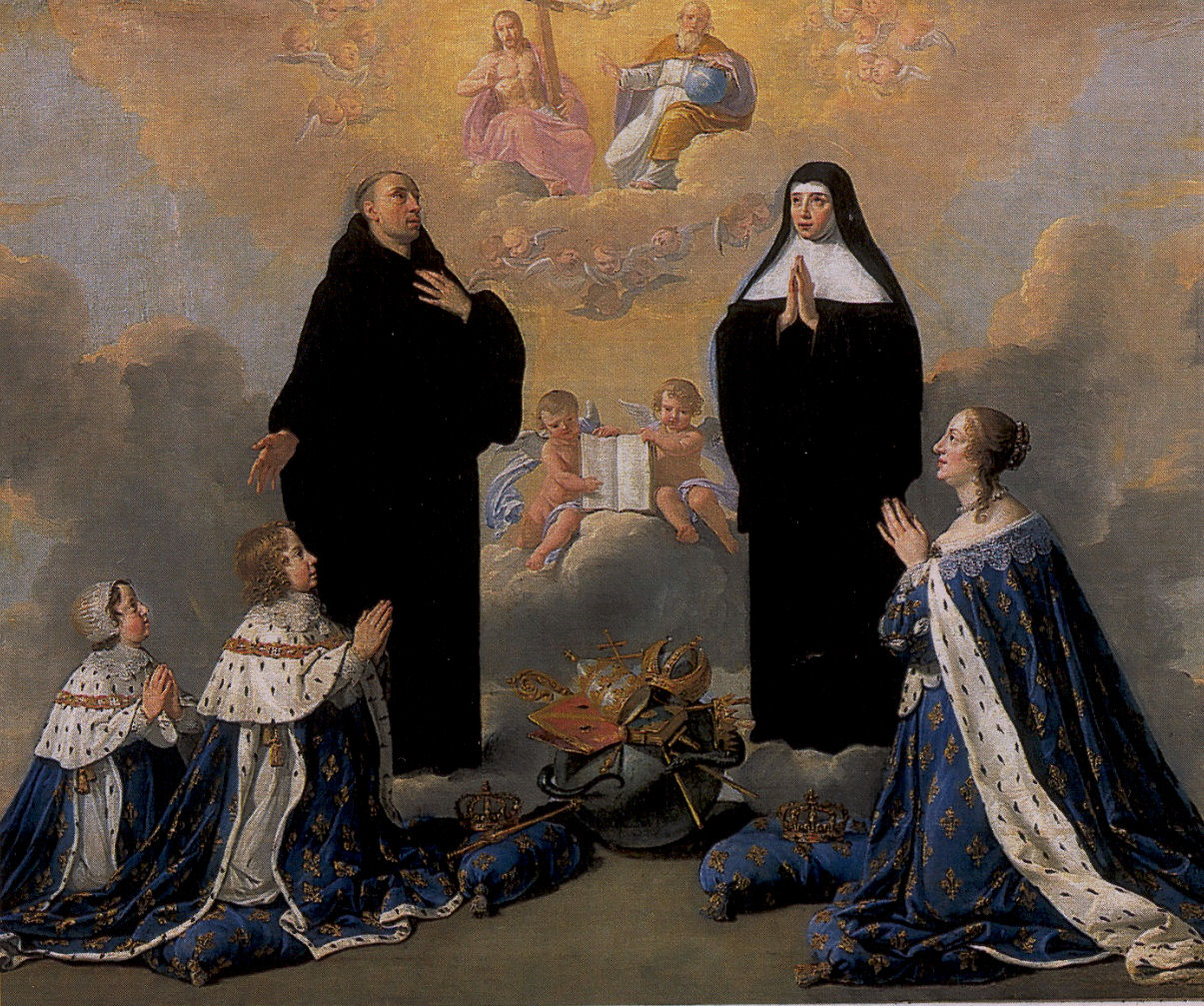
Anne of Austria with her children praying to the Holy Trinity with St Benedict and his sister St Scholastica by Philippe de Champaigne

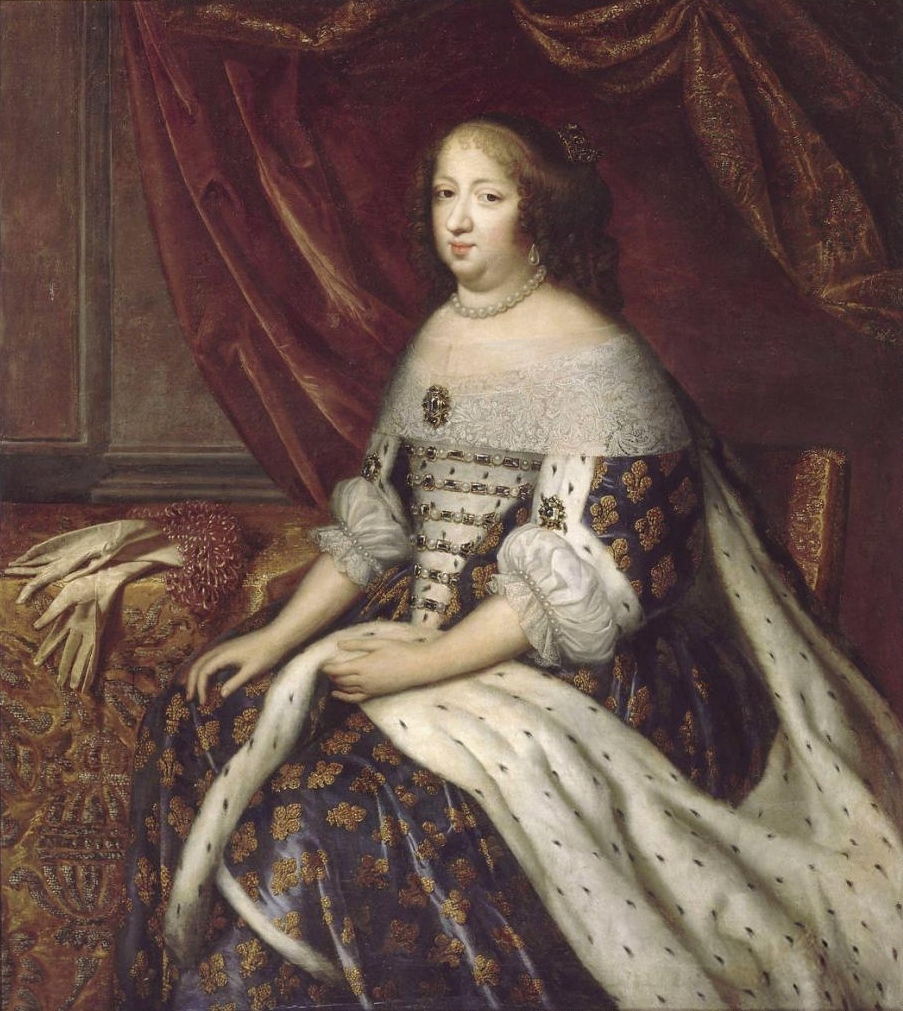
Portrait by Charles Beaubrun, c. 1650

== Explanatory footnotes ==
Anne of Austria House of Habsburg Born: 22 September 1601 Died: 20 January 1666
French royalty
Vacant Title last held by Marie de' Medici	Queen consort of Navarre; 1615–1620	French annexation
Vacant Title last held by Marie de' Medici	Queen consort of France; 1615–1643	Vacant Title next held by Maria Theresa of Spain
Portuguese royalty
Vacant Title last held by Philip (II)	Princess of Portugal; 22 September 1601 – 8 April 1605	Succeeded by Philip (III)
