= Saint-Aignan =

Saint-Aignan may refer to:

== Catholic saints ==
- Saint Aignan of Orleans (358–453), Bishop of Orléans, France, feast day 17 November
- Saint Aignan, Aegnanus, or Aman, of Besançon (died c. 374), Bishop of Besançon, feast day 5 September
- Saint Aignan of Chartres (5th century), Bishop of Chartres who allegedly did not exist and whose portrayed life was based on the one of Saint Aignan of Orléans

== Places in France ==
- Saint-Aignan, Ardennes
- Saint-Aignan, Gironde
- Saint-Aignan, Loir-et-Cher
- Saint-Aignan, Sarthe
- Saint-Aignan, Tarn-et-Garonne
- Saint-Aignan, Morbihan
- Mont-Saint-Aignan, in the Seine-Maritime department
- Saint-Aignan-de-Couptrain, in the Mayenne department
- Saint-Aignan-de-Cramesnil, in the Calvados department
- Saint-Aignan-des-Gués, in the Loiret department
- Saint-Aignan-des-Noyers, in the Cher department
- Saint-Aignan-Grandlieu, in the Loire-Atlantique department
- Saint-Aignan-le-Jaillard, in the Loiret department
- Saint-Aignan-sur-Roë, in the Mayenne department
- Saint-Aignan-sur-Ry, in the Seine-Maritime department

== Nobility ==
A line of family members bearing the title of comte de Saint-Aignan:

- Honorat de Beauvilliers, comte de Saint-Aignan (1579-1622), whose life was saved by Charles de Blanchefort at the Battle of Ponts-de-Cé (1620)

A line of family members bearing the title of Duke of Saint-Aignan :

- François de Beauvilliers, 1st duc de Saint-Aignan (1610-1687), first in line to be elevated to dukedom by Louis XIV of France
- Paul de Beauvilliers, 2nd duc de Saint-Aignan (1648-1714)
- Paul-Hippolyte de Beauvilliers, duke of Saint-Aignan (1684-1776)

== See also ==
- Saint-Agnan (disambiguation)
- Saint-Agnant (disambiguation)
