= Beauvilliers (surname) =

Beauvilliers (or Beauvillier) was the name of a very ancient French family belonging to the country around Chartres, members of which are found filling court offices from the 15th century onward.

- For Charles de Beauvillier, gentleman of the chamber to the king, governor and bailli of Blois, the estate of Saint-Aignan was created a countship in 1537.

Later, there were two ducs de Beauvilliers:

- François de Beauvilliers, 1st duc de Saint-Aignan (1610–1687)
- Paul de Beauvilliers, 2nd duc de Saint-Aignan (1648–1714), son of the former

Other members of the family included:

- Antoine Beauvilliers, pastry chef to the future Louis XVIII and proprietor of the Grande Taverne de Londres
- Paul-Hippolyte de Beauvilliers, duke of Saint-Aignan (1684–1776)
