= Adélaïde Diane Mancini =

French court official

- Princess of the Holy Roman Empire
- Full name: Adélaïde Diane Hortense Mancini
- Born: 27 December 1742
- Died: 2 May 1808 (aged 65); Neauphle-le-Vieux, France
- Spouse: Louis Hercule Timoléon de Cossé-Brissac (1760)
- Issue: Adélaïde, Duchess of Mortemart
- Father: Louis Jules Mancini, 10th Duke of Nevers
- Mother: Hélène Phélypeaux de Pontchartrain

Princess Adélaïde Diane Mancini called (27 December 1742 – 2 May 1808), Mancinette (27 December 1742 – 2 May 1808), was a French court official and member of the House of Mancini. She served as the dame d'atour to queen Marie Antoinette from 1771 to 1775. She is known to have curbed the expenses of the queen's wardrobe during her time in office and created order in the queen's economy, which was however ruined by her successor.

== Life ==
She was the daughter of Louis Jules Mancini, Duke of Nevers, Prince of the Holy Roman Empire (1716–1798), and his wife, Hélène-Françoise Angélique Phélypeaux de Pontchartrain (1715–1781), and married in 1760 to Louis Hercule Timoléon de Cossé, Duke of Brissac (1734–1792). They had one son, Jules Gabriel Timoléon, who died as a toddler, and one daughter, Adélaïde-Pauline-Rosalie, who lived to adulthood, married Victurnien de Rochechouart, Duke of Mortemart, and had several children of her own.

=== Appointment ===
In September 1771, she was appointed dame d'atour to the dauphine after the death of her predecessor, Amable-Gabrielle de Villars. Her appointment took place in the midst of a conflict between Marie Antoinette and Madame du Barry. She had been given the office on the request of du Barry, but this was because her husband was an ally of du Barry's and she was expected to share his loyalties and act as an agent of the royal mistress.

However, de Cossé had opposing opinions to those of her husband and actively allied with the crown princess against the royal mistress. Despite having du Barry to thank for her office, she refused her invitations and demonstrated her loyalty to the crown princess, which resulted in a chain of court scandals.

=== Dame d'atour ===
Adélaïde Diane was described as an honest and serious-minded person. When she took on her duties, she was reportedly shocked over the disorder and extravagance in the household of Marie Antoinette. In 1771, Marie Antoinette was not yet interested in fashion, and the financial disorder of her household was the result of the neglect by Adélaïde Diane de Cossé's predecessor in the office. Amable-Gabrielle de Villars had been given the office of dame d'atour to Marie Antoinette upon her arrival in France because the entire household of the former queen had been transferred to the new crown princess upon her arrival, and de Villars had merely kept her position. In reality, however, Amable-Gabrielle de Villars had by 1770 became too old and infirm to manage her office, and during her tenure, the Household of the Dauphine had abused her de facto absence to drain the Dauphine's economy.

Adélaïde Diane de Cossé managed to bring the finances in order and cooperated well with Florimond Claude, comte de Mercy-Argenteau. She kept her office when Marie Antoinette became queen in 1774. She resigned in protest in 1775 when the queen reintroduced the office of surintendante de la Maison de la Reine for her favorite, Marie Louise Thérèse of Savoy, Princesse de Lamballe. De Cossé was temporarily succeeded as dame d'atour by Laure Auguste de Fitz-James, princesse de Chimay, but more permanently by Marie-Jeanne de Mailly. By this point, Marie Antoinette had developed an interest in fashion, which was to eventually almost ruin her finances. The private economy of Marie Antoinette's wardrobe was not to be met with any restrictions until de Mailly's successor, Geneviève d'Ossun, took office and started to work towards curbing it.

=== Later life ===
Adélaïde Diane de Cossé spent the majority of the following years in Italy and in Nice, at that time a part of Savoy, as the warmer climate was judged better for her health. Her son, Jules Gabriel Timoléon, born in 1771, also suffered from poor health. She took him to Italy to improve, but he died in 1775.

She lived estranged from her husband, who was the lover of Madame du Barry from 1785 until his death.

On the outbreak of the French Revolution in 1789, she had been in Italy since 1787, and remained she there during the revolution. In 1792, she was widowed when her husband was murdered during the September Massacres. Her father was imprisoned during the Reign of Terror, and she herself was placed upon the list of emigrée's and her fortune in France was confiscated.

In 1797, her father, who had been released, was of ill health. She successfully applied to have herself removed from the emigrée list on the grounds that she had never emigrated during the Revolution, and to have her confiscated property restored by recommendation of General Joubert. She returned to France in September 1798.

Court offices
Preceded by Amable-Gabrielle de Villars	Dame d'atour to the Queen of France; 1774–1775	Succeeded by Laure Auguste de Fitz-James
