= Saint-Agnant =

Saint-Agnant may refer to the following places in France:

- Saint-Agnant, Charente-Maritime
- Saint-Agnant-de-Versillat, in the Creuse département
- Saint-Agnant-près-Crocq, in the Creuse département

== See also ==
- Saint-Agnan (disambiguation)
- Saint-Aignan (disambiguation)
