= Françoise Delord =

French ornithologist and zoo owner (1940–2021)

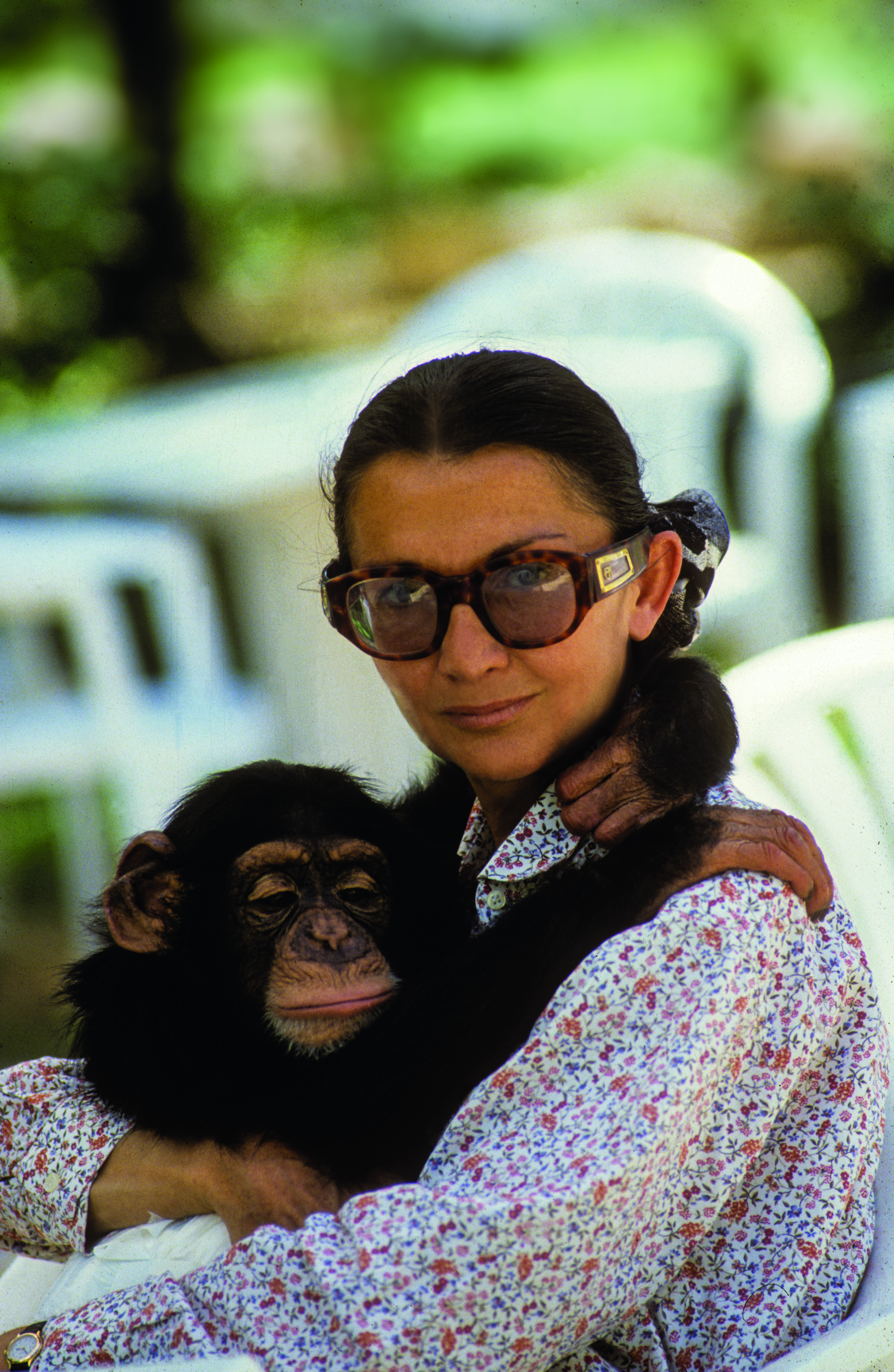
- Born: Françoise Jeanne Lajunias Doucet; 30 January 1940; Montargis, France
- Died: 3 December 2021 (aged 81)
- Occupations: Ornithologist, zoo owner
- Spouse: Jacques Delord
- Children: 2

Françoise Jeanne Lajunias Delord (née Doucet; 30 January 1940 – 3 December 2021) was a French ornithologist and zoo owner who was the founder and director of ZooParc de Beauval. After acting at Bobino, Delord became an ornithologist, authoring two books on the topic in the 1970s. In 1980, she opened an ornithological park, which later expanded to become the ZooParc de Beauval in 1989.

== Early life ==
Delord was born 30 January 1940 and raised by a single mother in Montargis. She studied at the Lycée Jeanne d'Arc in Orléans and subsequently at CNSAD. Delord initially began her career as an actress. She dreamed of entering the Comédie-Française and play the title role in the tragedy Phaedra. She worked at Bobino and presented 11 shows per week. For six years, she frequently interacted with artists such as Jacques Brel, Léo Ferré and Georges Brassens. While working in the theatre, she met her husband, Jacques Delord, a magician with whom she had two children: Rodolphe and Delphine. The couple later divorced.

== Ornithological career ==
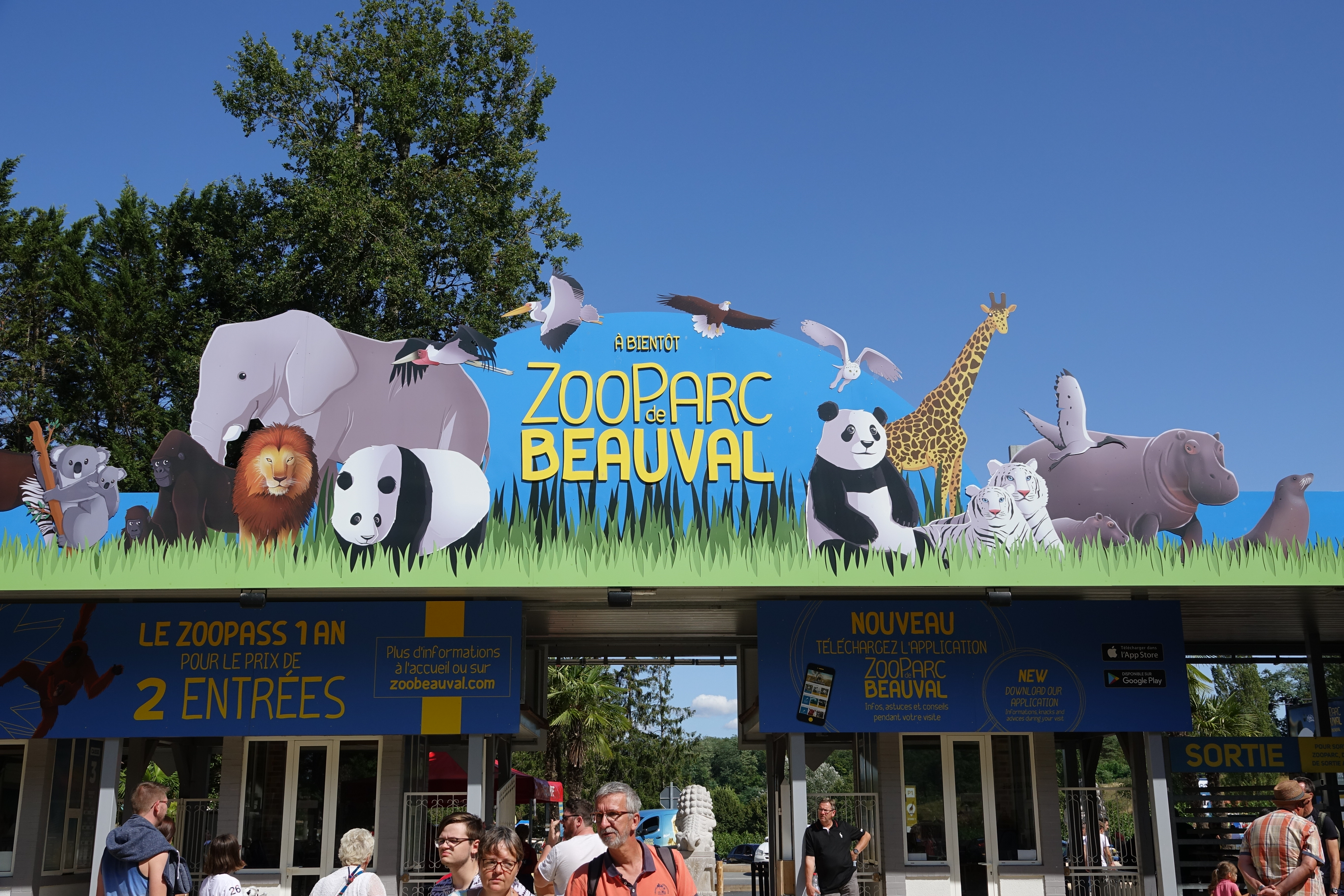
ZooParc de Beauval in 2019

In the early 1970s, Delord won two African silverbill birds as part of a contest, which would trigger her inspiration for a zoological park. She became an ornithologist, writing two books about birds. Delord frequently purchased new birds at pet stores and built an aviary in her Paris apartment. When the total number of birds reached 300, she and her family moved out of Paris and settled on a five-hectare property near Saint-Aignan.

In 1980, Delord opened an ornithological park, which was transformed into ZooParc de Beauval in 1989 following the acquisition of wildcats. In 1991, the zoo's stature grew when she acquired a pair of rare white tigers. In 2001, she was the only female French zoo director. At the 2006 Chinese Committee of Breeding Techniques for Giant Pandas in Thailand, Delord expressed a desire to adopt a pair of giant pandas. The zoo reached international profile when China loaned it a pair of pandas in 2012. As of 2011, it was home to 4600 animals, and was the only collection in France with koalas or manatees.

When Delord aged, she left control of the park to her children, Rodolphe and Delphine. In 2021, the zoo has 1.4 million visitors.

Françoise Delord died on 3 December 2021 at the age of 81.

== Selected works ==
- Delord, Françoise (1978). Perroquets et perruches (in French). Paris: Solar. ISBN 978-2-263-00222-9. OCLC 30010565.
- Delord, Françoise; Wailly, Philippe de (1977). Mes oiseaux et moi (in French). Paris: Hachette. OCLC 417951905.
- Delord, Françoise (2020). Instinct (in French). Beauval éditions. ISBN 978-2-9551964-9-6.
