= Jean Philippe d'Orléans =

Illegitimate son of Philippe II, Duke of Orléans

- bâtard d'Orléans le chevalier d'Orléans
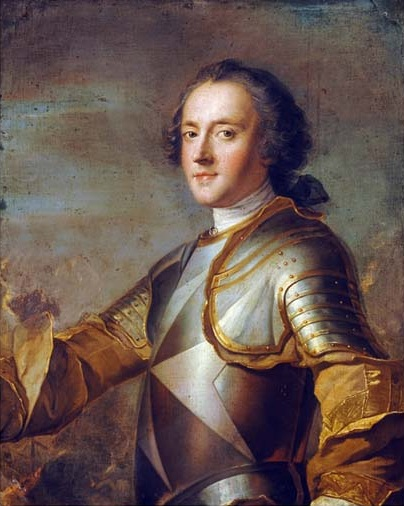
- portrait by Jean-Marc Nattier
- Born: 28 August 1702; Chilly-Mazarin, Paris, France
- Died: 16 June 1748 (aged 45); Palais du Temple, Paris, France
- Noble family: House of Orléans
- Issue: Amable Angélique de Villars (reputed)
- Father: Philippe ΙΙ d'Orléans
- Mother: Marie-Louise Le Bel de La Boissière

Jean Philippe, bâtard d'Orléans (28 August 1702 – 16 June 1748), called le chevalier d'Orléans or le Grand Prieur d'Orléans, was an illegitimate son of Philippe d'Orléans, nephew and son-in-law of Louis XIV.

== Biography ==
Born at Chilly-Mazarin, a southern suburb of Paris, he was the illegitimate son of Philippe d'Orléans (future Regent of France, 1715–1723, acting for the infant Louis XV) and his mistress Marie-Louise Madeleine Victorine Le Bel de La Bussière (1684–1748), known as the comtesse d'Argenton or madame d'Argenton.

His mother, known as Mademoiselle de Séry, was Lady-in-waiting to the Dowager Duchess of Orléans. She started an affair with Philippe d'Orléans, son of the Dowager Duchess. This infuriated Louis XIV, who maintained that actresses were bad enough, particularly when they gave birth to sons, but which the Duchess of Orléans did not. As well, by flaunting Séry, Philippe was insulting not only his wife but also the King, Madame d'Orléans' father. However, for the first time in his life, Philippe was seriously in love. Within a short time of their first encounter, Marie Louise was pregnant and installed in a pretty house near the Palais-Royal.

After several years the Duke was forced to give her up, as the King maintained she was endangering the Duke's daughter's prospects of marrying the Duke of Berry (1713), a grandson of Louis XIV.

His father had Jean Philippe legitimised in 1706 with the permission of his father-in-law (then the reigning Louis XIV). His legitimisation was registered with letters patent at Versailles signed in July 1706; these were then registered at the Chambre des comptes on 18 July and then at the Parlement of Paris on 27 September the same year.

He was brought up at the College of Jesuits in Paris. Under the direction of the Maréchal de Tessé, Jean Philippe was named the Général des galères (a sort of master of ships) in June 1716. At the death of Louis XIV in September 1715, his father Philippe d'Orléans was named a member of the Regency council and the duc du Maine was named Regent of France. Philippe d'Orléans had the will reversed and became Regent instead. The regency of Philippe d'Orléans lasted from 1715 till the majority of Louis XV in 1723.

This power allowed his father to create him the général des galères on 27 August 1716. Jean Philippe remained the general till his death in 1748, when the charge was abandoned.

His paternal grandmother, the Dowager Duchess of Orléans wrote of Jean Philippe;

My son has three illegitimate children, two boys and a girl; but only one of them is legitimated, that is, his son by Mademoiselle de Séry, a lady of noble family, and who was my Lady in waiting. The younger Margrave of Anspach was also in love with her. This son is called the Chevalier d'Orléans. The other, who is now [1716] about eighteen years old, is an Abbe; he is the son of La Florence, a dancer at the Opera House. The daughter is by Desmarets, the actress. My son says that the Chevalier d'Orléans is more unquestionably his than any of the others; but, to tell the truth, I think the Abbé has a stronger family likeness to my son than the Chevalier, who is like none of them. I do not know where my son found him; he is a good sort of person, but he has neither elegance nor beauty. It is a great pity that the Abbe is illegitimate: he is well made; his features are not bad; he has very good talents, and has studied much. He is a good deal like the portraits of the late Monsieur in his youth, only that he is bigger. When he stands near Mademoiselle de Valois it is easy to see that they belong to the same father. My son purchased for the Chevalier d'Orléans the office of General of the Galleys from the Marechal de Tasse. He intends to make him a Knight of Malta, so that he may live unmarried, for my son does not wish to have the illegitimate branches of his family extended. The Chevalier does not want wit; but he is a little satirical, a habit which he takes from his mother.,

He was later created the Grand Master or Grand Prior of the Knights of the Order of Malta in France which had previously been filled by the Chevalier de Vendôme who had resigned. Vendôme was a grandson of César de Bourbon, illegitimate son of Henri IV. The registration of this position occurred with the permission of Pope Clement XI on 26 September 1719. He commissioned the artist Jean-Marc Nattier to decorate the Palais du Temple, the Parisian residence of the Grand Prieur.

8 January 1721 saw Jean Philippe created the Abbot of the Abbaye Saint-Pierre d'Hautvillers dans la Marne, four months after the death of the previous Abbot, Monseigneur de Noailles. Jean Philippe officially became Abbot on 13 February 1722. According to contemporaries, he was very appreciative of religion, his father not being pious at all.

During the Regency, Jean Philippe had a range of diplomatic missions on behalf of his cousin Louis XV.

- He accompanied the infant Mademoiselle de Beaujolais (his legitimate half sister) to Spain when she was engaged to Infante Carlos of Spain in 1726. For this he was created a Grandee of Spain by Philip V despite the marriage between Beaujolais and Carlos never materialising.
- On behalf of Louis XV himself, Jean Philippe went from Paris to Cannes, in southern France, to greet the newly created Duke of Parma; The duke was the previously mentioned Infante Carlos who was later King of Naples and Sicily and later the King of Spain; he married in 1738 to Maria Amalia of Saxony, the marriage with Mademoiselle de Beaujolais being cancelled and she dying in 1734 aged 19.

Jean Philippe had one natural daughter, named Amable Angélique de Villars, (March 18, 1723 - Versailles September 16, 1771), who married February 4, 1744, Guy-Félix Pignatelli (1720–1753) Count of Egmont, Prince of Gavre, Duke of Bisaccia and Grandee of Spain (Widow, she took the veil at the convent of Calvary in Paris on 18 June 1754 and made her profession on 20 June 1755); she was Jean Philippe's only child. Amable Angélique was the daughter of Amable-Gabrielle de Villars (18 February 1706 – 16 September 1742) who was in turn the daughter of Adrien Maurice de Noialles and Françoise Charlotte d'Aubigné, niece of Madame de Maintenon. As of August 5, 1721, Amable Gabrielle was the wife of the renowned homosexual Honoré-Armand de Villares, 2e duc de Villars (4 December 1702 – May 1770), by whom she had no issue. Amable Angélique took de Villars' name and was accepted by him as his child.

He was wounded in 1744 on the Rhine and commanded galleys in the Mediterranean in 1746. He died in 1748 in Paris in his 46th year; he was followed by debts to the tune of almost 1 million livres.

== Sources ==
- Abbé Manceaux, Histoire de l'abbaye et du village d'Hautvillers, 1880.
