= Laure Auguste de Fitz-James =

French courtier (1744–1814)

- Princess of Chimay
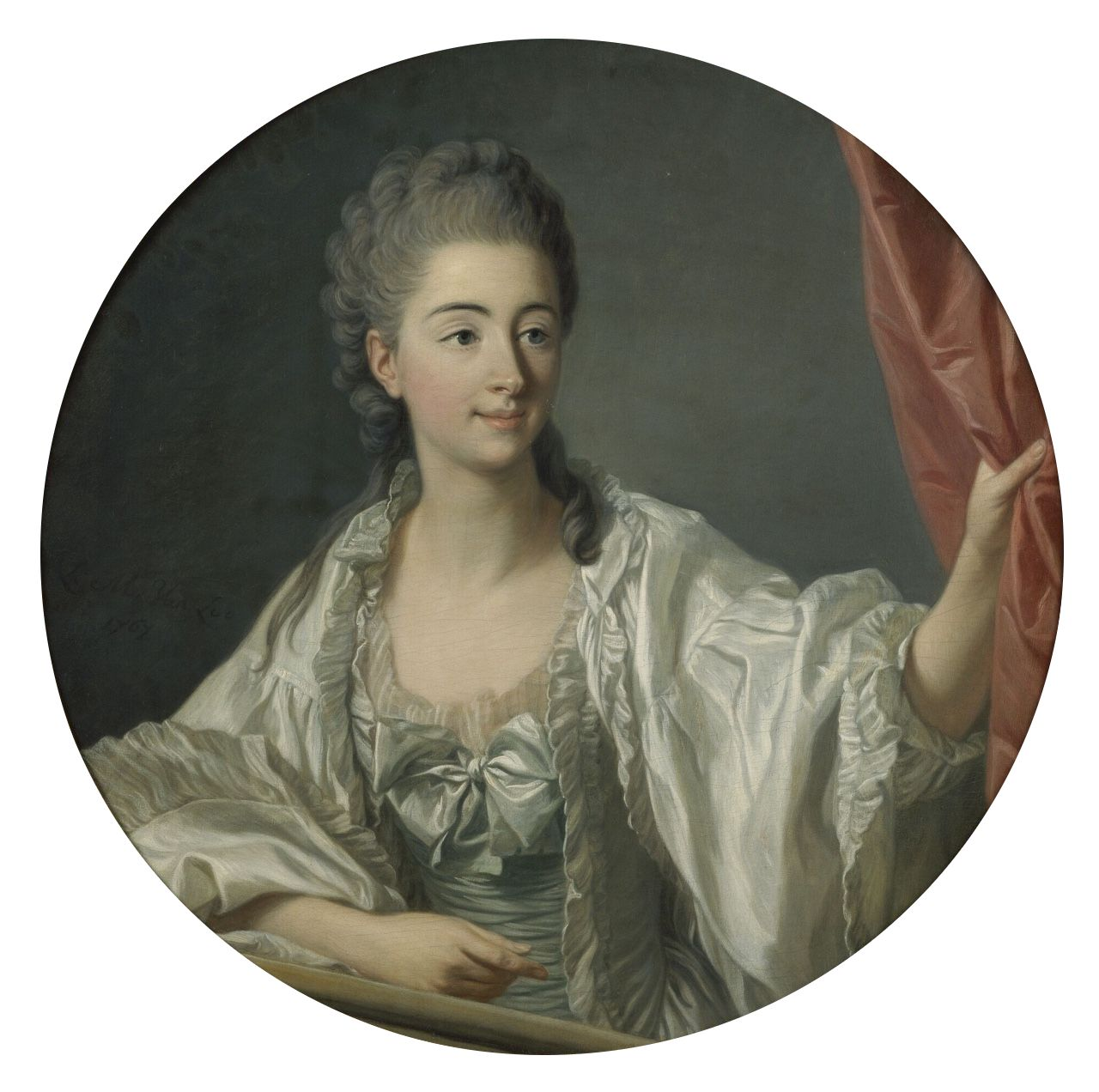
- Portrait of Laure-Auguste de FitzJames by Louis-Michel van Loo
- Born: 7 December 1744; Paris, France
- Died: 26 September 1814 (aged 69); Paris, France
- Noble family: FitzJames
- Spouses: Philippe Gabriel Maurice d'Alsace Henin-Liétard, 15th Prince of Chimay
- Father: Charles de Fitz-James
- Mother: Louise Victoire Sophie Goyon

Laure Auguste de Fitz-James, Princesse de Chimey (7 December 1744 – 26 September 1814) was a French courtier. She served as lady-in-waiting to Queen Marie Antoinette from 1770 to 1791.

== Early life ==
Laure-Auguste de Fitz-James was born in Paris as the daughter of Charles de Fitz-James, duc de Fitz-James, and Louise Victoire Sophie Goyons Matignon.

== Career ==
In 1762, de Chimay was appointed dame du palais, the same position her mother served in as to Marie Leszczynska. When the queen died in 1768, de Chimay kept this position awaiting the arrival of the dauphine, as did the première dame d'honneur Anne de Noailles, comtesse de Noailles and the dame d'atour Amable-Gabrielle de Villars. In January 1770, she began her service in the equivalent position of dame pour accompagner la dauphine to Marie Antoinette upon her arrival in France.

When Marie Antoinette became queen in 1774, she was again a dame du palais. In June 1775, she was appointed to dame d'atour, replacing Adélaïde Diane de Cossé, who had replaced Villars in 1771. In September 1775, she replaced Anne de Noailles, whom the queen disliked, as première dame d'honneur. Her position made her the first in rank of the female courtiers, but her rank was demoted to number two when the queen reintroduced the post of surintendante de la Maison de la Reine for Marie Thérèse Louise de Savoy, princesse de Lamballe, the same year. Because of this, the queen was obliged to compensate de Chimay by promoting one of de Chimay's relatives, in order to prevent her from leaving court.

De Chimay was described as reliable, dedicated and as having a good working relationship with Marie Antoinette, with whom she shared an interest in opera. When Victoire de Rohan, princesse de Guéméné, was to be replaced as Governess of the Children of France in 1782, de Chimay, along with Louise-Charlotte de Duras, duchesse de Duras, were commonly assumed to be the two most suitable candidates for the post. However, Marie Antoinette refused de Chimay because of her too severe religiosity and de Duras because she reportedly felt a certain academic inferiority toward her and chose Yolande de Polastron, duchesse de Polignac, for the position instead.

On the outbreak of the French Revolution, she belonged to the courtiers accompanying the royal family from Versailles to Paris after the Women's March on Versailles in October 1789. Described as "extremely unpopular", she left France in early 1791 during a flood of nobles emigrating after the departure of the Mesdames de France. After this, her office was given to Madame d'Ossun.

== Personal life ==
In 1762, she married Philippe Gabriel de Hénin-Liétard, prince de Chimay. She thus became the sister-in-law of Charles-Joseph de Hénin-Liétard d'Alsace.

She spent the following years in Germany and the Austrian Netherlands. She eventually returned to France and died in Paris.

Court offices
| Preceded by Adélaïde Diane de Cossé | Dame d'atour to the Queen of France; 1775–1775 | Succeeded by Marie-Jeanne de Mailly |
| Preceded by Anne d'Arpajon | Première dame d'honneur to the Queen of France; 1775–1791 | Succeeded by Geneviève de Gramont |
