= Luis Paret y Alcázar =

Spanish painter and member of prominent Alcazar family of Spain

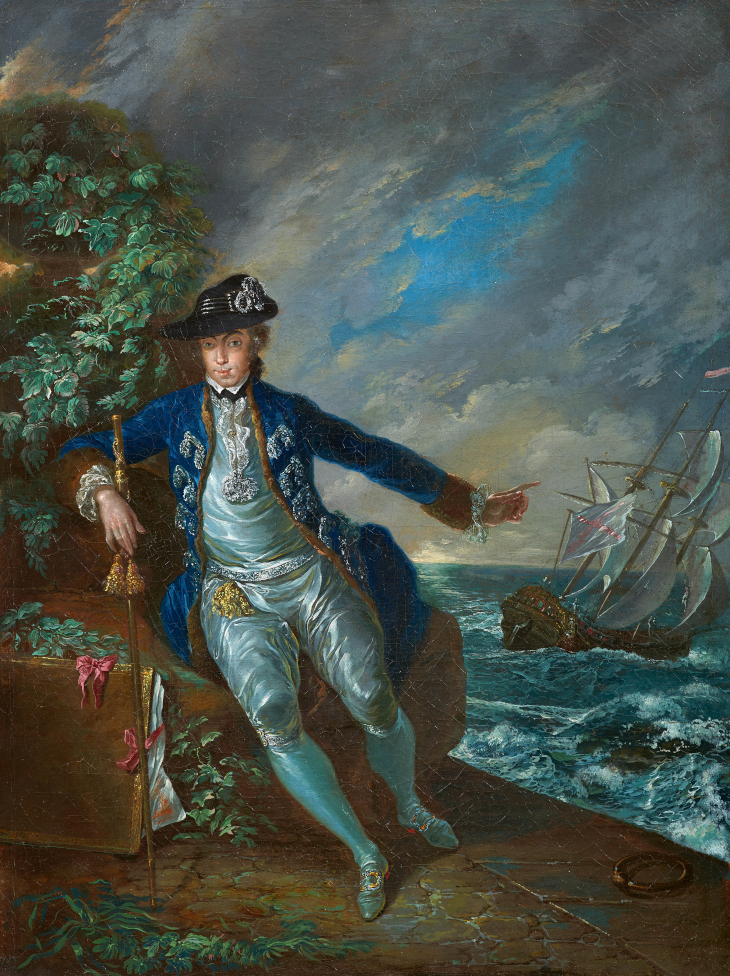
- Self-portrait, 1779
- Born: 11 February 1746; Madrid, Spain
- Died: 14 February 1799 (aged 53); Madrid, Spain
- Education: Antonio González Velázquez
- Alma mater: Real Academia de Bellas Artes de San Fernando
- Known for: painting
- Notable work: Jura de Fernando VII como Príncipe de Asturias (1791)
- Movement: Baroque

Luis Paret y Alcázar (11 February 1746 – 14 February 1799) was a Spanish painter of the late-Baroque or Rococo period.

== Biography ==
He was born in Madrid and was first trained with Antonio González Velázquez and attended the Academia Real de San Fernando in Madrid, where he won a second prize in a painting contest in 1760, and first prize in 1766. He entered the studio of the French painter Charles de la Traverse, who worked for Pierre Paul d'Ossun, the ambassador of France in Spain. Unfortunately upon returning to Madrid, despite becoming a teacher in the Academia de San Fernando at age 33 years, he mainly received royal commissions to paint and engrave vistas of ports, the Spanish equivalent of vedute, and also of planned works of construction. For some years, he was banished to Puerto Rico, where he trained the painter Jose Campeche. He also painted flowers in still life and genre paintings called bambochadas for their focus on the customs of the underclasses.

== Gallery ==
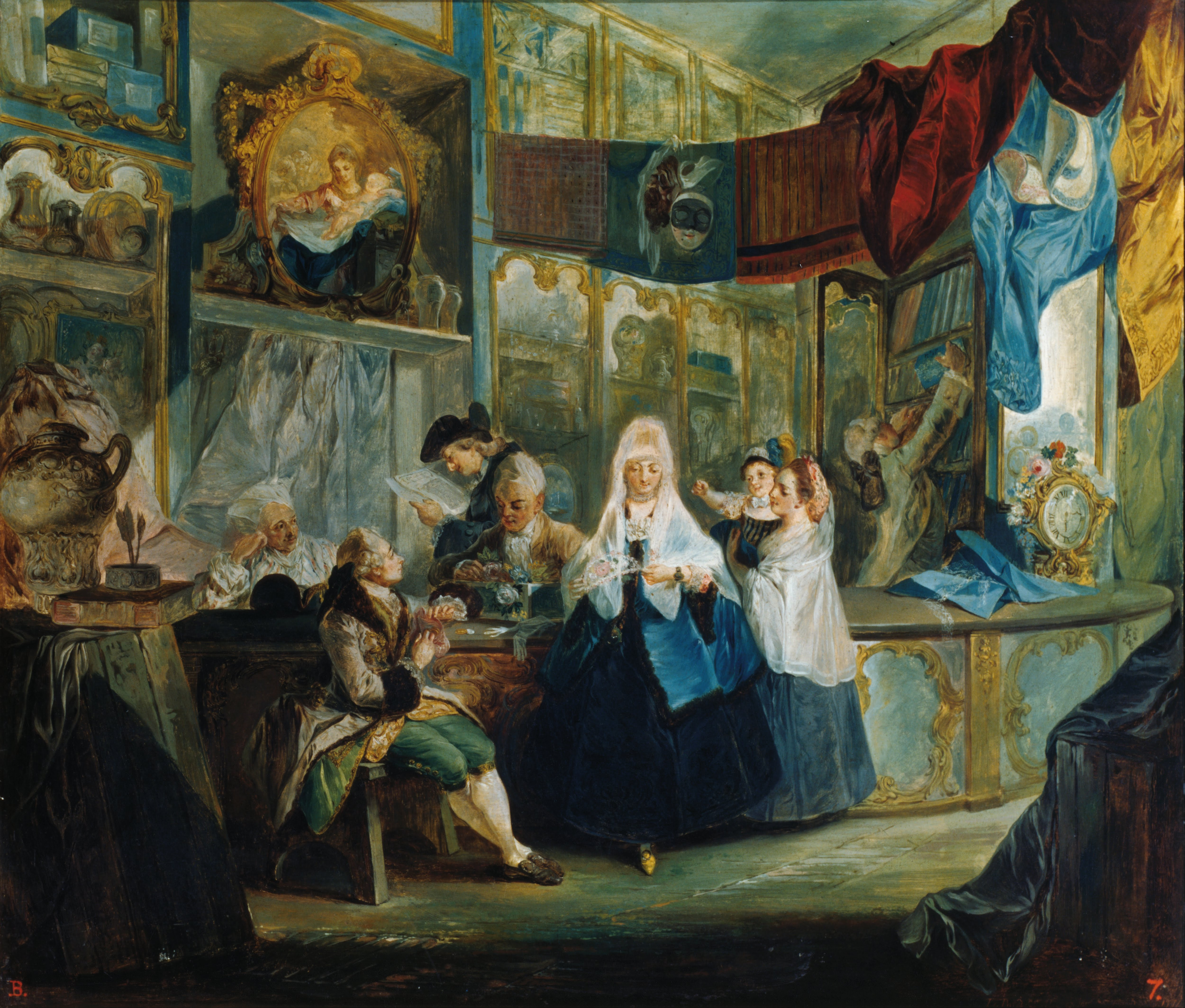
The Shop of anticuarian Geniani (1772)
Museo Lázaro Galdiano

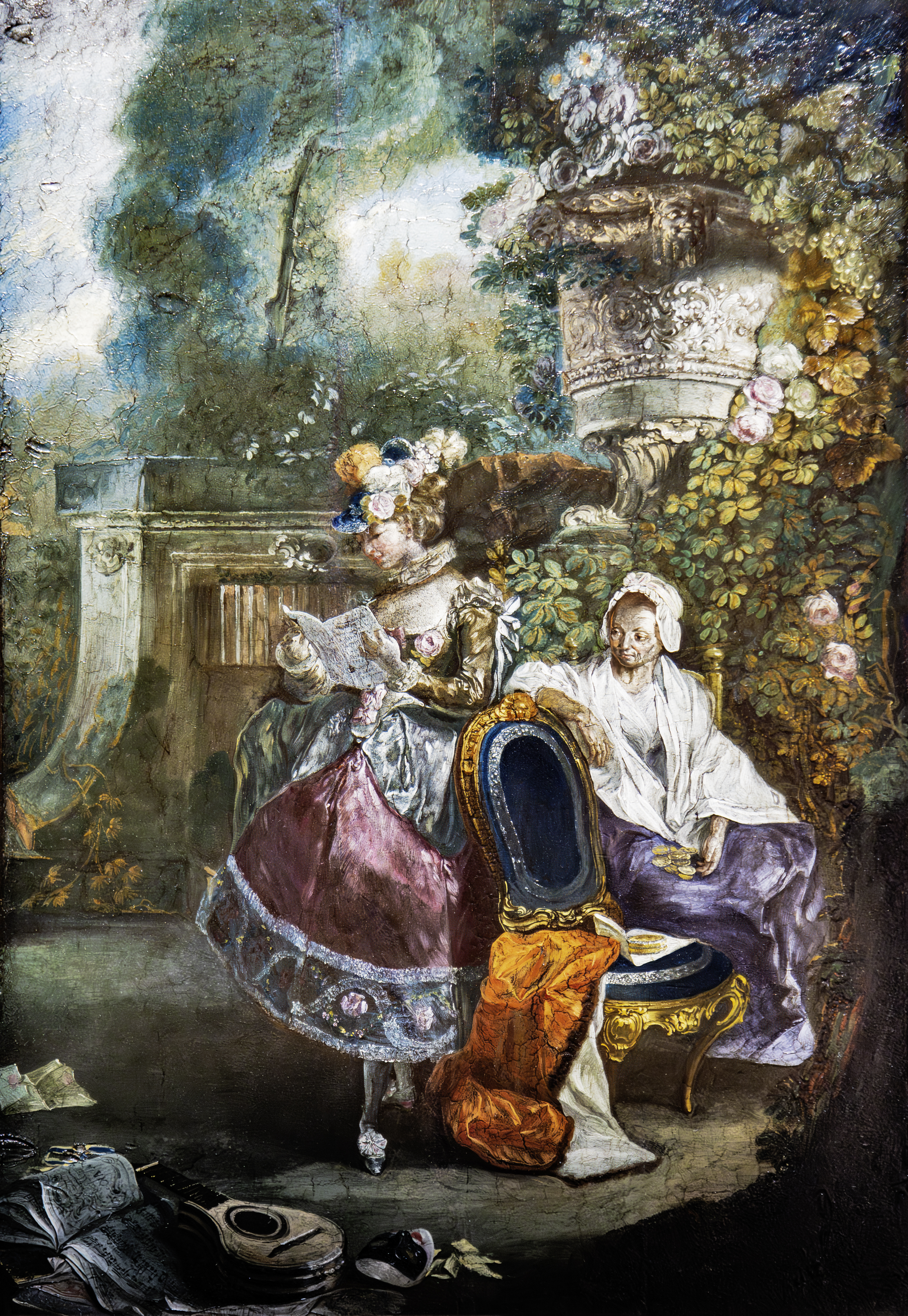
La carta (1772)
Goya Museum

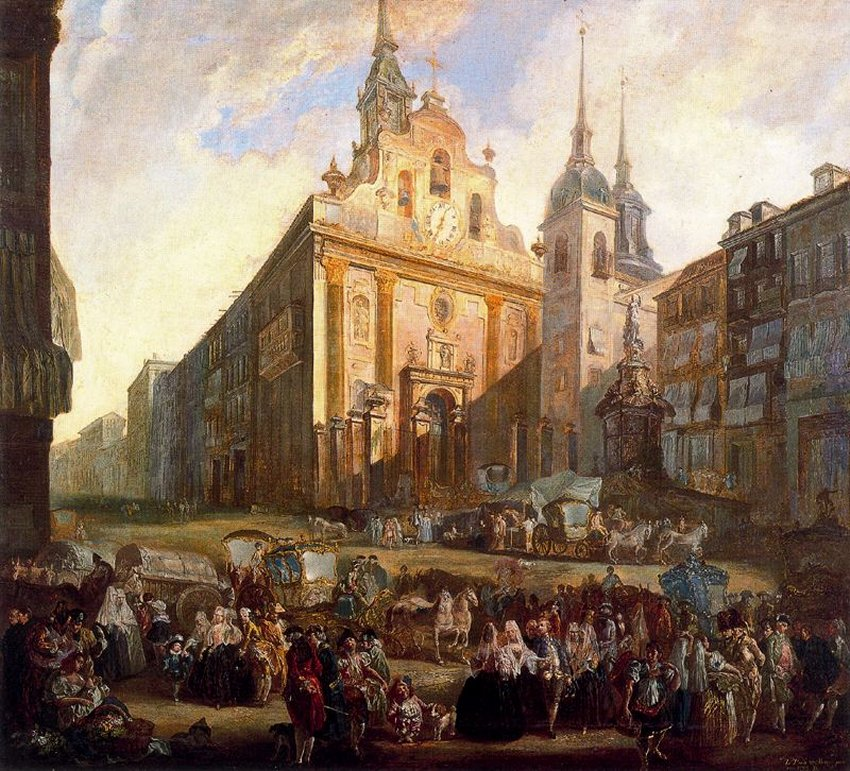
The Puerta del Sol in Madrid (1773)
Museo Nacional de Bellas Artes de Cuba

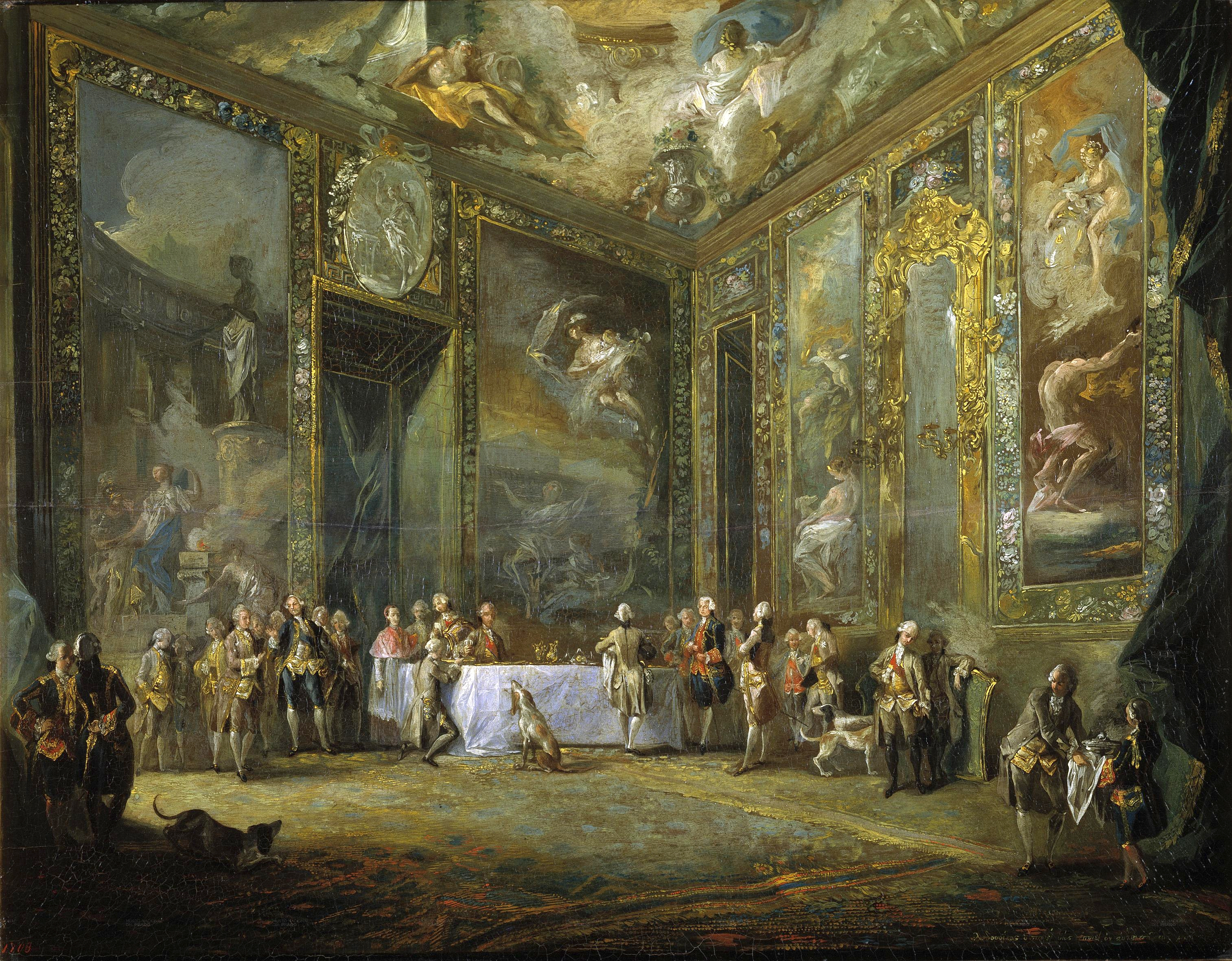
Charles III Dining before the Court (c. 1775)
Museo del Prado

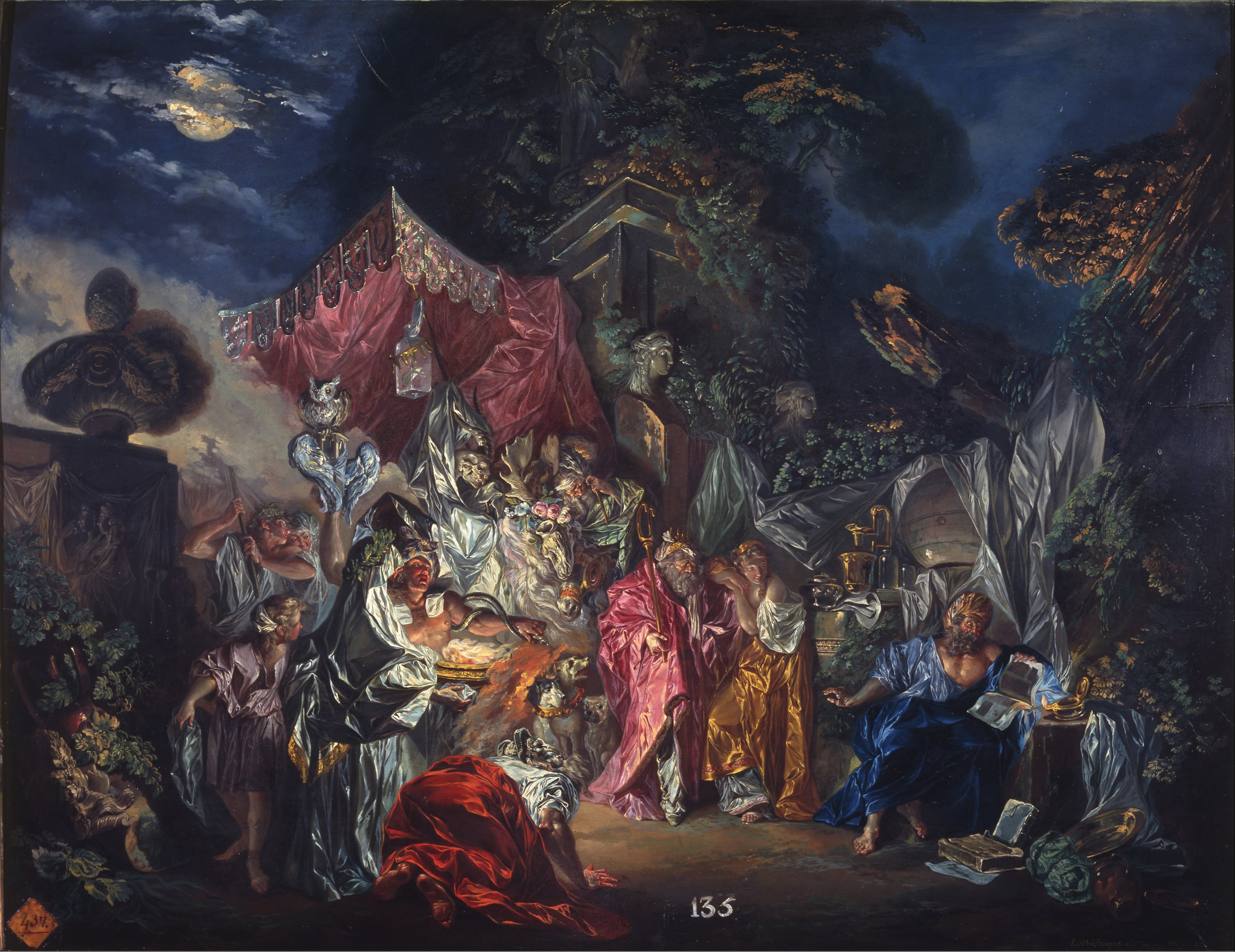
Circumspection of Diogenes (1780)
Real Academia de Bellas Artes de San Fernando

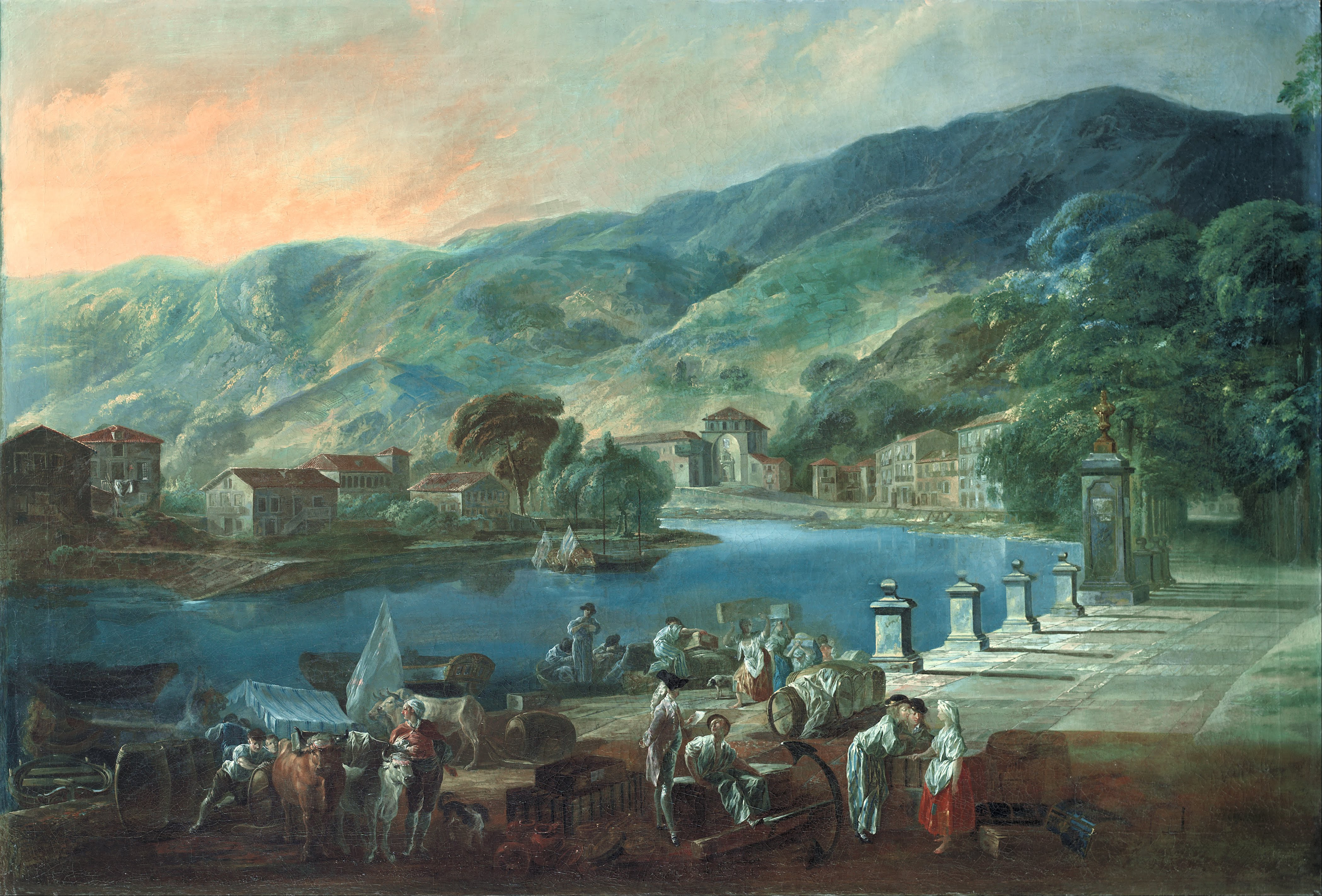
View of El Arenal in Bilbao (1783-84)
Museo de Bellas Artes de Bilbao

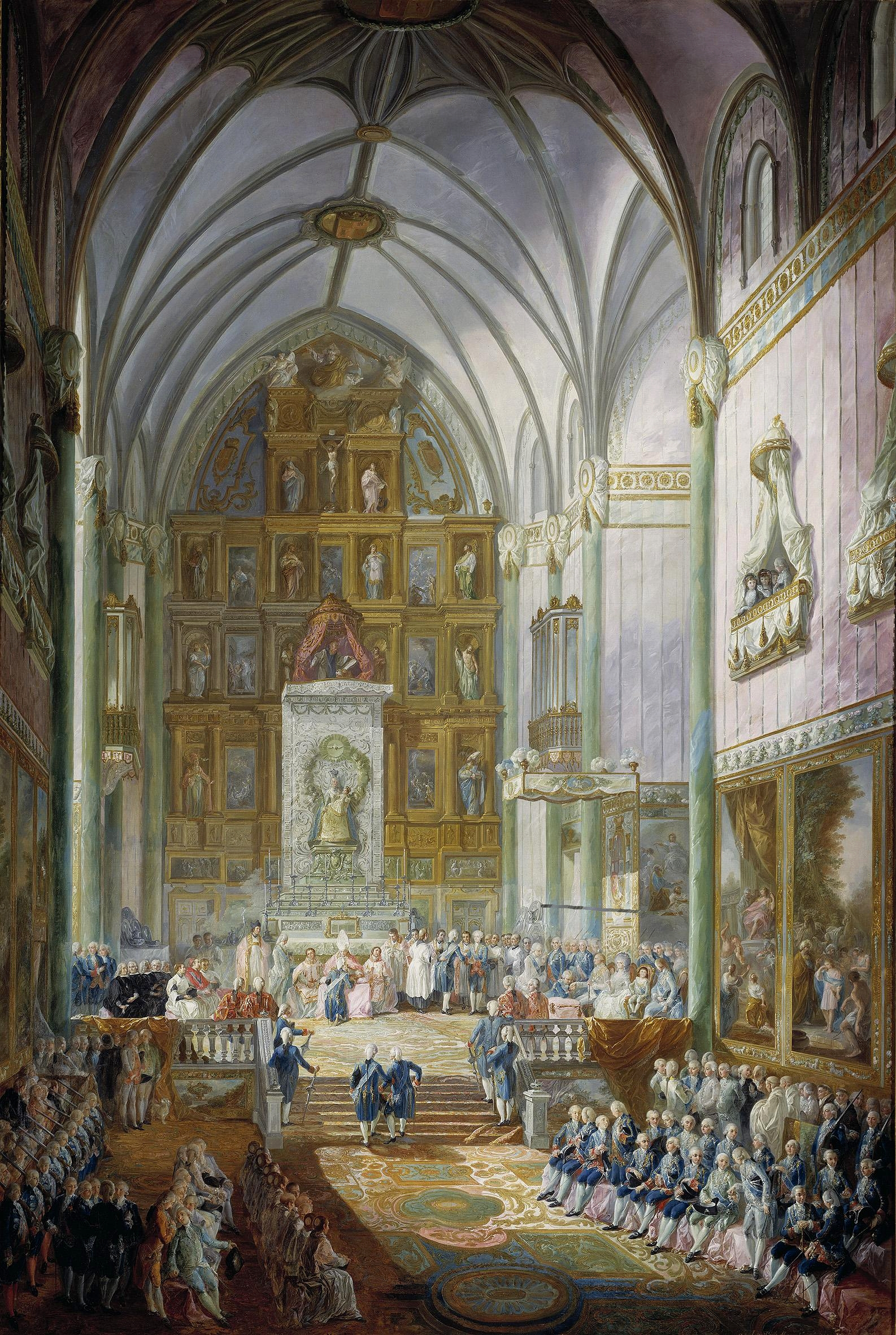
Jura de Fernando VII como Príncipe de Asturias (1791)
Museo del Prado
