= Marie Louise Madeleine Victoire d'Argenton =

Marie Louise Madeleine Victoire d'Argenton (1684–1749), was the royal mistress of Philippe II, Duke of Orléans from 1702 until 1710. She was the mother of Jean Philippe d'Orléans.

Her parents were Daniel le Bel and Marie Anne Masparault. She was from a noble family and maid of honor to the mother of Philippe.

When she and Philippe had a child, she lost her position as a courtier. However, she was provided with a house by Philippe, and their relationship became public.

In 1706, she was given the title of Countess d’Argenton. In 1709, she acted as Philippe's hostess for the reception of the Duke of Bavaria. d'Argenton was the subject of several political speculations.

When the relationship was discontinued in 1710, she asked to enter a convent, but was refused permission. Instead, she was given an allowance.

She married Charles-Rodrigue Gonzague de Forbier, Chevalier d’Oppède in 1713, and was widowed in 1717.

== Sources ==
- Argenton (Marie-Louise-Madeleine-Victoire Le Bel de La Boissière de Séry, comtesse d’). In: Louis-Gabriel Michaud (Hrsg.): Biographie universelle ancienne et moderne, 2. Auflage, Bd. 2 (1854), S. 189f. (online).
