= Dame d'atours =

Office of the French royal court

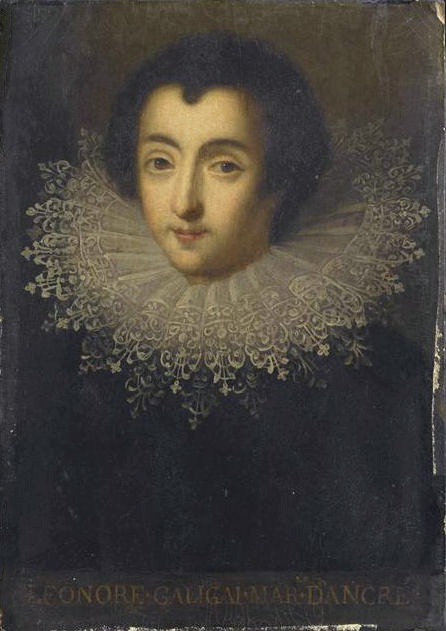
Leonora Dori Galigaï

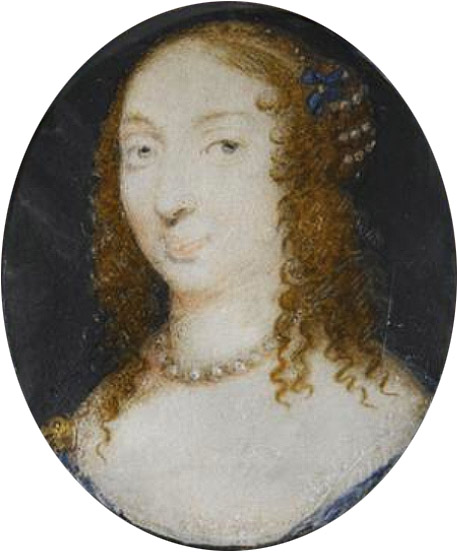
Marie d'Hautefort

Dame d'atour (French pronunciation: [dam datuʁ]) was an office at the royal court of France. It existed in nearly all French courts from the 16th-century onward. The dame d'honneur was selected from the members of the highest French nobility. They were ranked between the Première dame d'honneur and the Dame du Palais.

== History ==
At least from Isabeau of Bavaria's tenure as queen, there had been a post named demoiselle d'atour or femme d'atour, but this had originally been the title of the queen's chambermaids and shared by several people.

The office of dame d'atour, created in 1534, was one of the highest-ranking offices among the ladies-in-waiting of the queen and given only to members of the nobility.

The dame d'atour was responsible for the queen's wardrobe and jewelry and supervised the dressing of the queen and the chamber staff of femme du chambre.

When the Première dame d'honneur was absent, she was replaced by the dame d'atour as the supervisor of the female personnel of the queen.

== List of dames d'atour to the queens and empresses of France ==
=== Catherine de' Medici, 1547–1589 ===
- 1547–1549 : Marie-Catherine Gondi
- 1549–1552 : Jacqueline de l'Hospital Dame d'Aisnay
- 1552–1559 : Madeleine Buonaiuti, Madame Alamanni, Mme de Gondi

=== Mary, Queen of Scots, 1559–1561 ===
- 1559–1561: Guyonne de Breüil

=== Élisabeth d'Autriche, 1570–1575 ===
- 1570–1574: Marguerite de La Marck-Arenberg

=== Louise of Lorraine, 1575–1601 ===
- 1575–1590: Louise de la Béraudière

=== Marie de' Medici, 1600–1632 ===
- 1600–1617: Leonora Dori
- 1617–1619: Vacant
- 1619–1625: Nicole du Plessis de Mailly, marquise de Brezé
- 1625–1631: Duchesse d'Aiguillon

=== Anne of Austria, 1615–1666 ===
- 1615–1619: Luisa de Osorio (jointly with de Vernet)
- 1615–1626: Antoinette d'Albert de Luynes, Dame de Vernet (jointly with de Osorio)
- 1626–1626: Marie-Catherine de Senecey
- 1626–1630: Madeleine du Fargis
- 1630–1657: Catherine le Voyer de Lignerolles, Baronne du Bellay, Dame de la Flotte
  - 1637–1639: Marie de Hautefort, 'Madame de Hautefort' (deputy dame d'atour, first term)
  - 1643–1644: Marie de Hautefort, duchesse de Schomberg (second term as deputy)
- 1657–1666: Louise Boyer, duchesse de Noailles

=== Maria Theresa of Spain, 1660–1683 ===
- 1660–1683: Anne Marie de Beauvilliers, Countess of Bethune

=== Marie Leszczyńska, 1725–1768 ===
- 1725–1731: Anne-Marie-Francoise de Sainte-Hermine, comtesse de Mailly
- 1731–1742: Francoise de Mailly, duchesse de Mazarin
- 1742–1768: Amable-Gabrielle de Noailles, duchesse de Villars

=== Marie Antoinette, 1770–1791 ===
- 1770–1771: Amable-Gabrielle de Villars
- 1771–1775: Adelaide-Diane-Hortense Mancini-Mazarin, duchesse de Cossé
- 1775–1775: Laure-Auguste de Fitz-James, Princess de Chimay
- 1775–1781: Marie-Jeanne de Talleyrand-Périgord, duchesse de Mailly
- 1781–1791: Geneviève de Gramont, comtesse d'Ossun

=== Joséphine de Beauharnais, 1804–1809 ===
- 1804–1809: Émilie de Beauharnais

=== Marie Louise, 1810–1814 ===
- 1810–1814: Jeanne Charlotte du Luçay

== See also ==
- First Lady of the Bedchamber, British equivalent
- Maid of the Bedchamber
