= Charles-Alexandre de Hénin-Liétard d'Alsace =

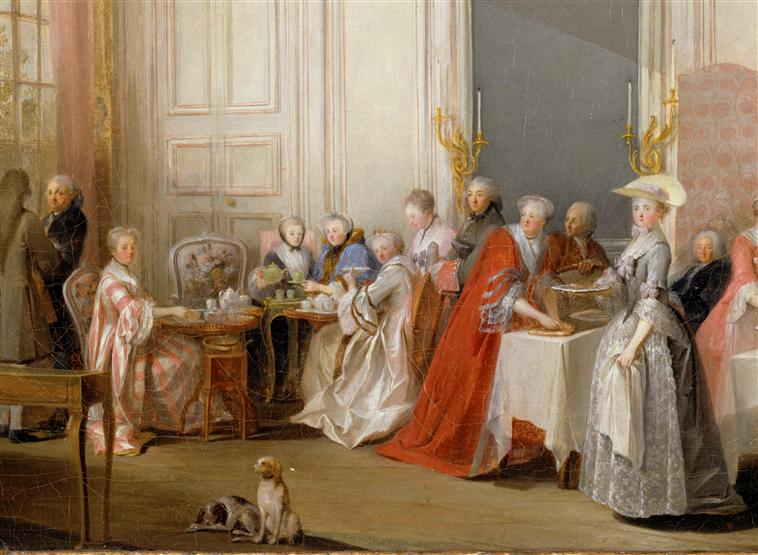

Charles Alexandre Marc Marcelin de Hénin-Liétard d'Alsace (1744–1794), prince of Henin and count of Beaumont, was a prince of the Holy Roman Empire who took French nationality. During the French Revolution he was executed by guillotine on charges of counter-revolutionary conspiracy.

== Family ==
Hénin was born in Brussels on the 17 June 1744, son of Alexandre Gabriel Joseph de Hénin-Liétard, Marquess of La Verre, and was baptised in the Church of St. James on Coudenberg. The Archbishop of Mechelen, Cardinal d'Alsace, was his uncle.

On 29 September 1766 he married in France to Adélaïde Félicité Étiennette de Monconseil, daughter of Étienne Guinot, marquis de Monconseil (1750–1823). Adelaïde became a lady of Queen Marie Antoinette's household. She was presented to the queen in Versailles after her marriage by her sister in law, the Princesse de Chimay.

== Court life ==
Hénin became captain of a company of the Garde du Corps attached to the Count of Artois (the future Charles X of France).

His relationship with the opera singer Sophie Arnould, while his wife was engaged in an affair with the chevalier de Coigny, caused a stir in French high society. Wits at court nicknamed Hénin le prince des nains (prince of dwarfs), in reference to his intellectual stature.

== Death ==
During the Revolution he was incarcerated in the former Luxembourg Palace, then in use as a prison. On 7 July 1794, in the final days of the Reign of Terror, he was one of 59 suspects summarily tried by the Revolutionary Tribunal and executed as counter-revolutionary conspirators. The dowager princess survived the Revolution, dying without heirs in 1823.

== Succession ==
As Hénin had been born a subject of the Austrian Habsburgs, and died leaving a will whose sole beneficiary had predeceased him, the settlement of his estate – which could not take place until after the Bourbon Restoration in France in 1814 – became a test case of French succession law.
