= Anne-Marie-Francoise de Sainte-Hermine =

French court official (1760–1734)

Anne-Marie-Francoise de Sainte-Hermine (1670 – 1734), was a French court official. She served as the dame d'atour to Françoise Marie de Bourbon from 1692 to 1696, to Marie Adélaïde de Savoy from 1697 to 1712, and to queen Marie Leszczyńska from 1725 to 1731. She was a central figure in the French royal court and mentioned in contemporary memoirs.

She was the daughter of Hélie de Sainte-Hermine, seigneur de La Laigne et du Roseau, and Anne-Madeleine de Valois de Villette, and was married, in 1687, to Louis de Mailly (1663-1699). She was the mother of Françoise de Mazarin and the grandmother of the famous Nesle sisters, royal mistresses to Louis XV.

Court offices
Preceded by Anne Marie de Bethune	Dame d'atour to the Queen of France; 1725–1731	Succeeded by Françoise de Mazarin
