= Françoise de Mailly =

French court official (1688–1742)

Full length allegorical portrait of Françoise de Mailly by Jean-Marc Nattier

Françoise de Mailly (French pronunciation: [fʁɑ̃swaz də maji]; 1688–1742), was a French court official. She served as the dame d'atour to queen Marie Leszczyńska in 1731–1742.

She was born Françoise de Mailly, the daughter of Louis de Mailly (1663–1699) and Anne-Marie-Francoise de Sainte-Hermine. She married Louis Phélypeaux, marquis de la Vrillière, on 1 September 1700, but he died only five years later in 1725, and she was left widowed. On 14 June 1731, she married Paul-Jules de la Porte de Meilleraye, duc de Meilleraye, but he too died after only three months of marriage.

She was appointed dame d'atour to queen Marie Leszczyńska on 25 August 1731, succeeding her mother. She became the queen's personal friend and favorite among the ladies-in-waiting alongside Marie Brûlart, duchesse de Luynes. She introduced her son, Louis Phélypeaux, comte de Saint-Florentin, at court, where he became state secretary. She disliked the position of her granddaughter, Louise Julie de Mailly-Nesle, comtesse de Mailly, as royal mistress, and died in the middle of an intrigue to replace Louise Julie with her younger granddaughter, Marie Anne de Mailly-Nesle.

Court offices
Preceded by Anne-Marie-Francoise de Sainte-Hermine	Dame d'atour to the Queen of France; 1731–1742	Succeeded by Amable-Gabrielle de Villars
