= ZooParc de Beauval =

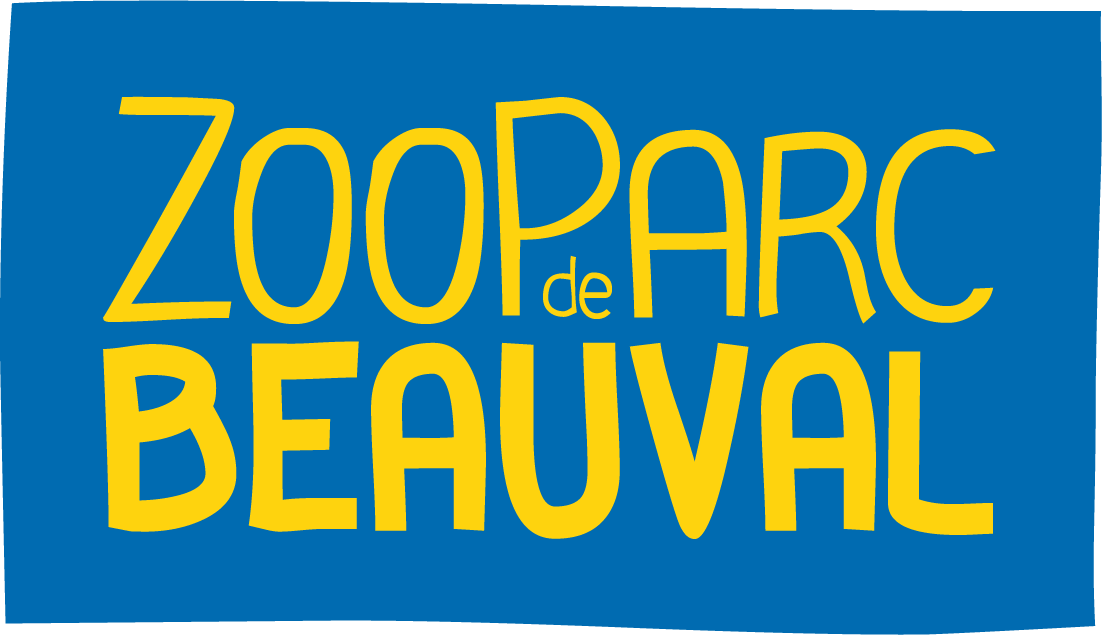

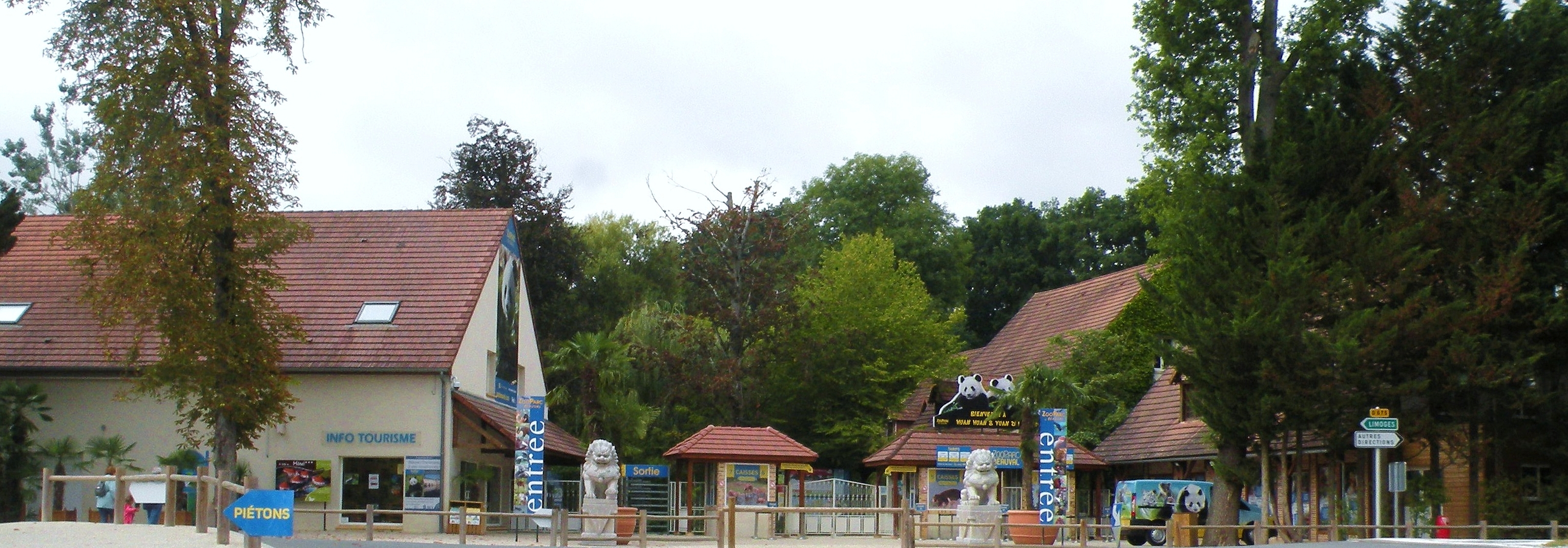
- Main entrance
- Interactive map of ZooParc de Beauval
- 47.24754°N 1.35336°E
- Date opened: 1980
- Location: Saint-Aignan-sur-Cher, Centre, France
- Land area: 40 hectares
- No. of animals: 35,000 (2020)
- No. of species: 800 (2020)
- Annual visitors: 1.6 million
- Memberships: EAZA, WAZA
- Owner: Delord family
- Director: Rodolphe Delord
- Website: www.zoobeauval.com

The ZooParc de Beauval (French pronunciation: [zopaʁk də boval]), more commonly called Beauval Zoo or, more simply, Beauval, is a French zoological park located in Saint-Aignan-sur-Cher, Centre-Val de Loire. It features more than 35,000 animals on 40 hectares, which is one of the largest animal collections in France and in Europe. Created in 1980 by Françoise Delord, it is now run by her son, Rodolphe Delord, and managed by his family, which owns most of the capital.

Beauval was often the first zoo to house certain animals in France, which contributed to its reputation and to its development. It was the first zoo in France to present leucistic big cats, such as white tigers and white lions, in the 1990s. Other rare, unique or endangered species housed at the zoo include okapis, tree kangaroos, koalas and giant pandas.

Four greenhouses present birds, great apes, sloths, reptiles, manatees and Australasian animals, while three plains present herbivores of the African savannah (like giraffes, white rhinos and antelopes), African elephants and Asian herbivores (such as Indian rhinos and Malayan tapirs). Other facilities in the park are the Chinese zone called "On China Heights", the African swamp called "The Hippos' Reserve", the sea lion basin presenting "The Sea Lions' Odyssey" and an outdoor theatre presenting a free-flight bird show entitled "Masters of Airs".

As a permanent member of the European Association of Zoos and Aquaria, it joined ex situ conservation by participating in European Endangered Species Programme (EEP), in which it coordinates three programs. It also supports in situ conservation associations working in the field through its dedicated association, Beauval Nature, and has reintroduced several animals in Africa.

The ZooParc de Beauval has three accommodation facilities: an apartment hotel, Les Hameaux de Beauval, and two three-star hotels: Les Jardins de Beauval Balinese inspired and Les Pagodes de Beauval in Chinese style.

With more than 1,600,000 annual visitors since 2019, it is the most visited tourist site of the Centre-Val de Loire region, one of the five most visited zoological institutions in France and the most visited conventional private zoo in the country. In 2019, the ZooParc de Beauval had 600 permanent employees. In 2019, it had a revenue of 66 million euros and a net income of 4.47 million euros.

== History ==
=== 1970s and 1980s ===
In the early 1970s, Françoise Lajunias Dite Delord (1940–2021), a former student at the Paris Conservatory of Dramatic Art and presenter of performances at the Bobino music hall, received as a gift – at the Salon de l'Enfance, with a subscription to a children's newspaper – a pair of African silverbills, a species of African passerine. Shortly after, having acquired a bird cage for them on the Quai de la Mégisserie, she returned there to acquire two grey Zebra finches, then two white. Its collection of birds grew to reach four hundred individuals. In 1980, faced with the impossibility of housing them all in Paris, she moved with her husband, the conjurer Jacques Delord, and their two children, Delphine and Rodolphe, to Saint-Aignan-sur-Cher, where she opened a bird park in Beauval, on either side of a small tributary of the Cher, le Traine-Feuilles. Some 1,500 to 2,000 birds are present in the aviaries of Beauval. In 1989, Beauval became a zoological park by welcoming its first mammals, including big cats and primates.

=== 1990s ===
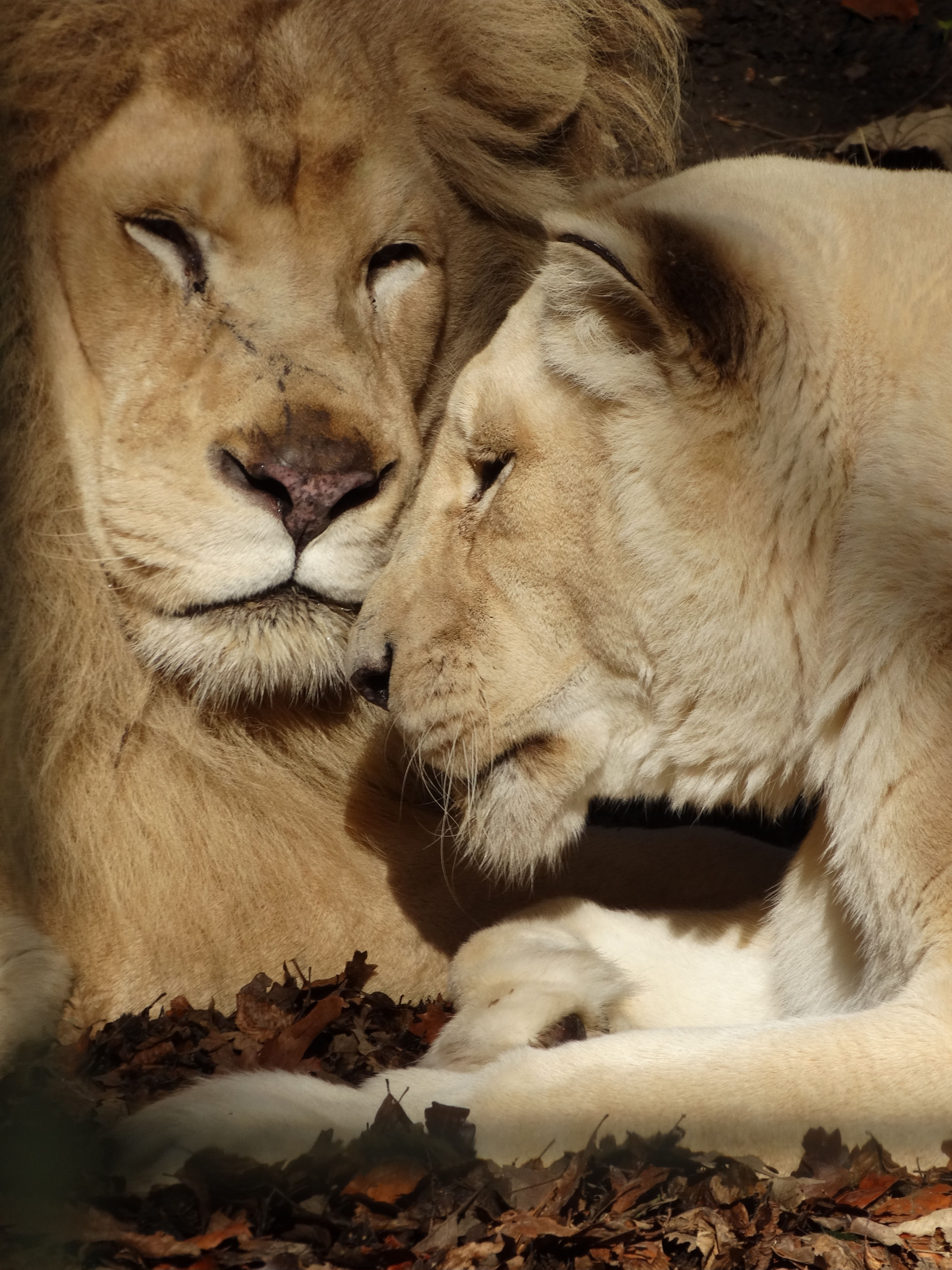
Makwalo and Makalali arrived in 1999.

In 1990, the ZooParc welcomed its first lions.

In 1991, Beauval presented its first white tigers, Gorby and Raïssa, purchased for $100,000 from Robert Baudy, owner of the Rare Feline Breeding Center, a big cat breeding center based in Center Hill, Florida, in the United States. They are supposedly of the Siberian tiger subspecies, with some hybridization, probably of the Bengal tiger subspecies. Although they are not the first white tigers to be presented in Europe, they were unique in France at the time of their arrival in Beauval, which made the zoo known and attract many visitors. In that year, the number of admissions went from 70,000 to 150,000.

In 1992, the zoo opened its first greenhouse, a tropical greenhouse for great apes. The greenhouse houses two groups of great ape, Bornean orangutans and chimpanzees, with two outer islands of 1,100 m^{2} and 1,300 m^{2} respectively. The same year, Françoise Delord acquired a female chimpanzee from a circus, for 10,000 francs.

In 1993, a vivarium was opened in the greenhouse of the great apes and received around a hundred snakes and Nile crocodiles, observable underwater thanks to a large aqua-terrarium.

In 1994, the second greenhouse of the park was opened, a tropical bird greenhouse, with a surface area of 2,000 m^{2}, where 300 exotic birds are housed, living in a rainforest setting.

In 1995, a sea lion pool was built and the park gave its first show combining free flight raptors and sea lions.

In 1996, a nursery, intended for the breeding of young animals, was created. The zoo welcomed Asian small-clawed otters, red pandas and raccoons whose enclosures are decorated with tackle and underwater viewing pools.

In 1997, the park opened a third tropical greenhouse housing gorillas and manatees.

In 1998, two new structures welcomed hyenas and African wild dogs.

In 1999, the park welcomed a pair of white lions and created an African plain exhibit in which 80 animals of several species are presented, including springbok, sable antelope, blue wildebeest, Grévy's zebras, giraffes, ostriches, Egyptian goose and marabou storks. One of the giraffes, a male, named Joseph, was imported from Marwell Zoo in the United Kingdom, while the lechwes come from the Czech Republic. The two white lions bought that year by the park, Makalali and Makwalo, came from a farm in Timbavati, South Africa, but the name of the farm and the price remains a secret. Like the purchase of the white tigers in 1991, this acquisition has no zoological interest but confers a commercial advantage to the zoo, because although Makalali and Makwalo are not the first white lions to be presented in Europe, they are unique in France at the time of their arrival in Beauval.

=== 2000s ===
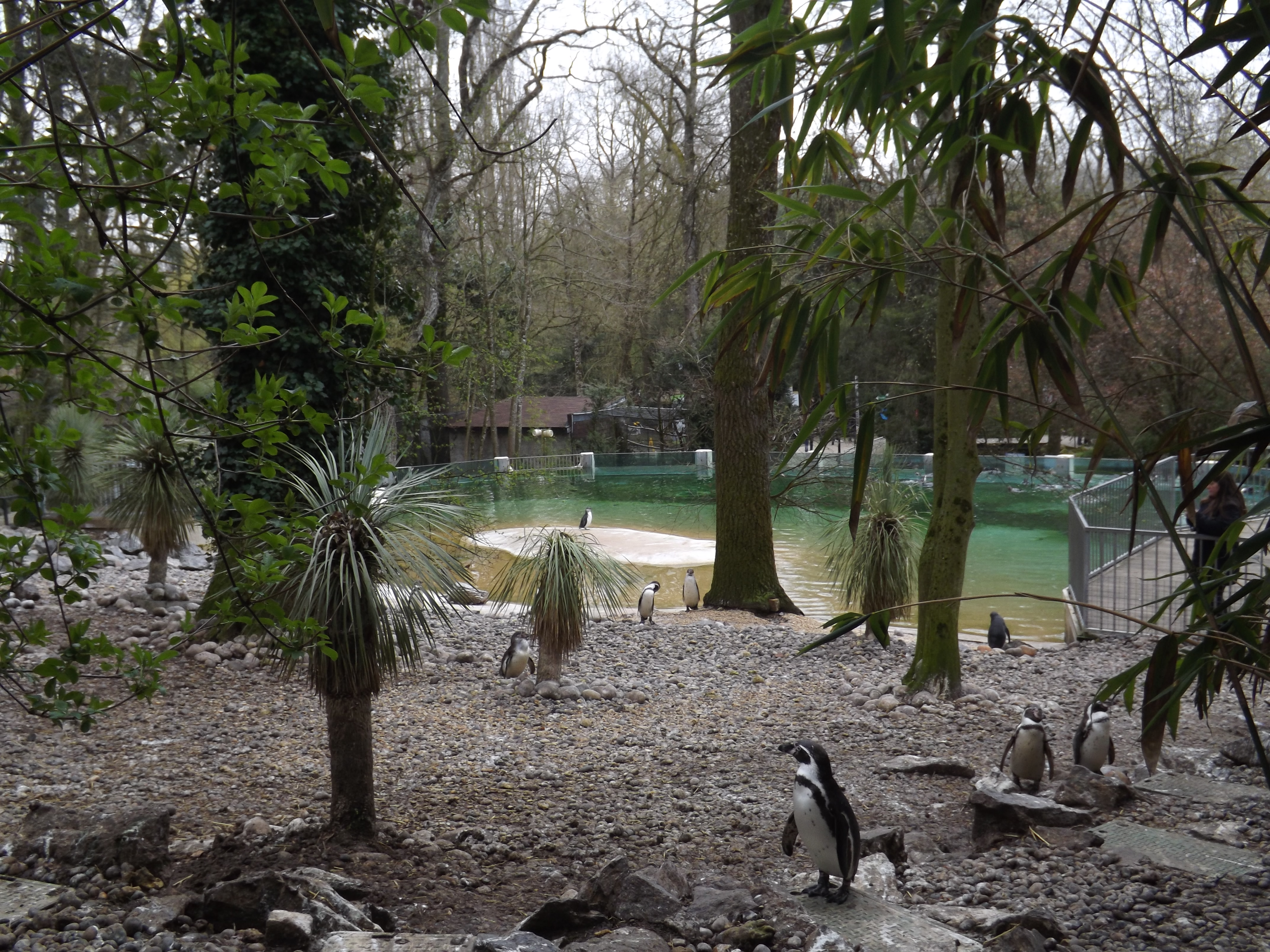
The penguin pool built in 2007

In 2000, three white rhinos joined the African Savannah exhibit.

In 2001, a nursery was created for the hand-raising of parrot chicks.

In 2002, an Australian greenhouse was created and a pair of koalas, tree-kangaroos and a marine aquarium were installed there. In addition, the mini-farm, hitherto located at the entrance of the park, is moving and growing.

In 2003, the zoo expanded by five hectares to accommodate a group of five African elephants. They benefit from 0.5 hectares of sandy park, 0.9 hectares of grassy park, a four-meter deep basin that completely immerses them and a building of over 1,500 m^{2}.

In 2004, the vivarium was renovated in an area of 400 m^{2}, which is occupied by more than 250 reptiles, including snakes, turtles, crocodiles and iguanas. The park received a three-year-old white tiger, Chile, from the Parken Zoo in Eskilstuna, Sweden.

In 2005, okapis arrived at the zoo; for five years, the ZooParc became be the only zoological park in France to present the species. The park also received a two-year-old male white tiger, Sherkan, born at Touroparc zoo. With Chile, he formed the second breeding pair of Beauval white tigers, replacing Gorby and Raïssa, then nearing the end of their life.

In 2006, the zoo welcomed Somali wild asses, East Javan langurs and clouded leopards, and a piranha pool was created in the gorilla and manatee greenhouse.

In 2007, a pool for Humboldt penguins was created, with a size of 600 m³ with a tree-lined beach of 400 m^{2}, and a South American pampas exhibit for housing giant anteaters was also created.

In 2008, a hotel structure was created. This is a three-star hotel, Les Jardins de Beauval, about 1 km from the zoo entrance. Giant anteaters and Sumatran tigers, the first non-leukic tigers to be welcomed in Beauval, were housed at the park and a new aquarium was built with a coral reef theme.

In 2009, a female koala named Alkoomie and a male white rhino named Kanty were born. The ZooParc created the Beauval Nature association and the park also enlarged the area of spotted hyenas.

=== 2010s ===
In 2010, a 1.5-hectare Asian plain was created, housing Malayan tapirs, Indian rhinoceroses, muntjac, white-naped cranes, axis deer, blackbuck, nilgais and fishing cats. A second koala, named Joey, was also born.

In 2011, a new area of almost three hectares called "Sur les hauteurs de Chine" opened, housing takins, snow leopards, red pandas, northern plains gray langurs and Steller's sea eagles. In February, a female Indian rhinoceros arrived at the park. A pair of Sumatran tigers and a female manatee were then welcomed in March. A white rhino and a sixth gorilla were born.

== Animal overview ==
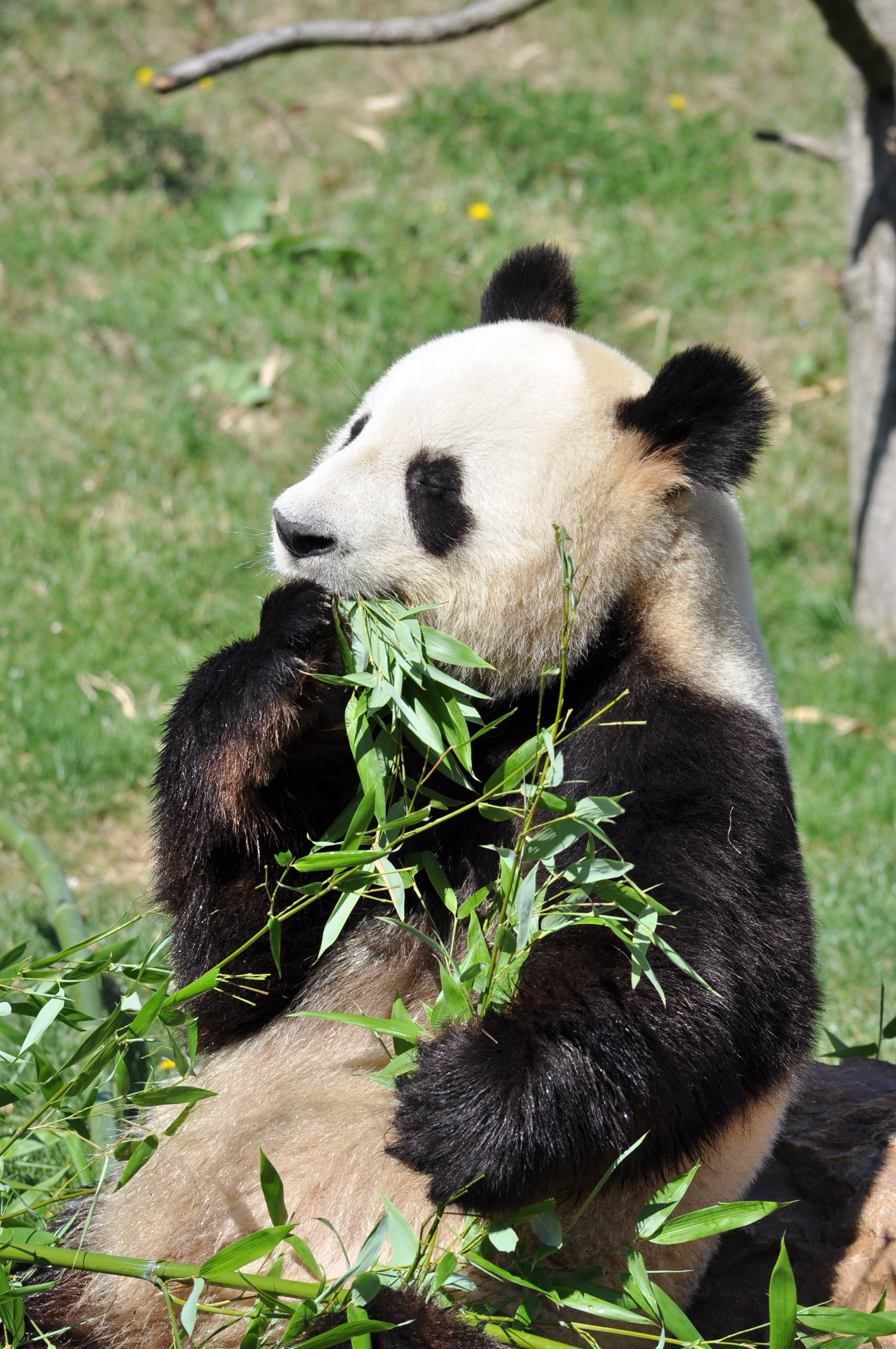
Giant panda at ZooParc de Beauval

=== La Savane Africaine ===
The African Savannah habitat is home to a large collection of African animals roaming together. Separated from the visitors by gravel ditches, thirteen species of animals live together here, including giraffes, white rhinoceroses, Grevy's zebras, wildebeest, ostriches, Egyptian geese, springbok, lechwes and reedbuck.

=== Australian House ===
The Australian House is one of the few places in Europe where koalas and Goodfellow's tree-kangaroos can be seen. There is also an aquarium, home to 1,500 species of fish from Australia's Great Barrier Reef. There are also rat-kangaroos and kookaburras. Nearby outdoor enclosures house red kangaroos, both in large enclosures.

=== Manatee Basin ===
The Manatee Basin is a habitat for a family of West Indian manatees, and ZooParc de Beauval has one of the most successful breeding herds in Europe. The manatee tank is 26 degrees, with 1,000 cubic meters of water and two meters of glass around part of the tank. As well as manatees, the pool hosts Amazonian fish and river turtles. Each manatee consumes up to 50 kg of vegetation per day, preferring to eat lettuce, celery and carrots. The first baby manatee at the park, Sylvester, was born on December 31, 2001, and was later followed in 2003 by the world's first captive-born manatee twins.

=== Serre Tropicale des Grands Singes ===
This house was made to provide shelter for some of the park's many primates. Some of the primate species present include the troop of chimpanzees and the orangutans (which live alongside gibbon families). Both species of primate live on large outdoor islands that can be viewed easily, and each group of primates have 400 meters of ground to explore. At the beginning of this house is a vivarium, home to one hundred snakes, as well as turtles and American alligators that can be observed underwater. At the far end of the house is an area devoted to small primates, with emperor tamarins, and pygmy marmosets.

=== Gorilla complex ===
Leading on from the Bassin le Lamantins, the Gorilla Complex is a huge 11-meter-tall greenhouse, home to free-flying ducks and birds such as toucans. There is a lagoon home to rays, and a large indoor habitat for a family of gorillas, with a huge 9-meter space to allow the gorillas to climb. The gorillas also have access to a large outdoor island.

=== Big cats ===
A dedicated big cat complex houses, among others:

- Sumatran tigers
- Jaguars (including a black panther)
- Pumas
- White tigers
- White lions
- Persian leopards

There are also spotted hyenas near the big cat complex.

=== Smaller animals ===
A collection of four smaller enclosures near the Gorilla Complex is home to four different species, including groups of otters, red pandas, raccoons and Barbary macaques.

=== Show ===
The show features a family of Californian sea lions, as well as performing parrots and birds of prey. There are nine adult sea lions and their four pups, and all were born in Beauval.

=== La Réserve Des Hippopotames ===
Opened in 2016, this extensive exhibit is home to a small pod of hippos, as well as a herd of nyalas and red river hogs. The exhibit is complemented by massive baobab trees and a metal net, spanning the entire enclosure. This is because the exhibit also houses many African birds such as hamerkops and Eurasian spoonbills.

=== Le Dôme Équatorial ===
Opened in 2020, this exhibit is Beauval's latest development. It holds around 200 different species underneath a one hectare and 38-metre-tall (125 ft) dome. It lets in sunlight through a glass roof and it constantly heated to a temperature of 26 °C. Stars of the exhibit include pygmy hippos, giant otters, harpy eagles and many more species. Soon to arrive at the dome are red-shanked douc langurs, a species only found in one zoo in Europe and nowhere in North America.
