= Anne Marie de Beauvilliers =

- Countess of Béthune
- Full name: Anne Marie de Beauvilliers
- Born: 30 November 1609 or 1610
- Died: 12 November 1688 or 12 November 1698
- Spouses: Hippolyte de Béthune, Count of Selles (1629)
- Issue: Henri, Count of Selles; Armand, Bishop of Puy
- Father: Honorat de Beauvilliers, 6th Count of Saint-Aignan
- Mother: Jacqueline de La Grange

Anne Marie de Beauvilliers (1610–1688), was a French court official. She served as the dame d'atour to the queen of France, Queen Marie Thérèse from 1660 to 1683. She was a figure in the French royal court and mentioned several times in contemporary memoirs.

She was the daughter of François de Beauvilliers, 1st duc de Saint-Aignan, sister of Paul de Beauvilliers, 2nd duc de Saint-Aignan, and married in 1629 to Hippolyte de Béthune (1603-1665). Count of Selles, Marquis of Chabris but known as the Count of Béthune.

== References and notes ==
Court offices
Preceded by Catherine le Voyer de Lignerolles	Dame d'atour to the Queen of France; 1660–1683	Succeeded by Anne-Marie-Francoise de Sainte-Hermine
