= Duke of Saint-Aignan =

Shield of the Duke of Saint-Aignan

Duke of Saint-Aignan (Fr.: duc de Saint-Aignan) was a title of nobility in the peerage of France created by King Louis XIV for François de Beauvilliers in 1663. It takes its name from Beauvilliers' hometown of Saint-Aignan (which is close to Blois).

== List of dukes of Saint-Aignan, 1663—1828 ==
| From | To | Duke of Saint-Aignan | Relationship to predecessor |
|---|---|---|---|
| 1663 | 1687 | François de Beauvilliers, 1st duc de Saint-Aignan (1610-1687) | First Duke of Saint-Aignan |
| 1679 | 1706 | Paul de Beauvilliers, 2nd duc de Saint-Aignan (1648-1714) | Son of François de Beauvilliers, 1st duc de Saint-Aignan |
| 1706 | 1738 | Paul-Hippolyte de Beauvilliers, duke of Saint-Aignan (1684-1776) | Son of Paul de Beauvilliers, 2nd duc de Saint-Aignan |
| 1738 | 1742 | Paul François de Beauvilliers (1710-1742) | Son of Paul-Hippolyte de Beauvilliers, duke of Saint-Aignan |
| 1742 | 1757 | Paul Louis de Beauvilliers (1711-1757) | Brother of Paul François de Beauvilliers |
| 1757 | 1771 | Paul Etienne Auguste de Beauvilliers (1745-1771) | Son of Paul Louis de Beauvilliers |
| 1771 | 1794 | Paul Marie Victoire de Beauvilliers (1766-1794) | Son of Paul Etienne Auguste de Beauvilliers |
| 1794 | 1811 | Raymond François de Beauvilliers (1790-1811) | Son of Paul Marie Victoire de Beauvilliers |
| 1811 | 1828 | Charles Paul François de Beauvilliers (1745-1828) | Great nephew of Raymond François de Beauvilliers |
