= List of governors of Provence =

This is a list of governors of Provence.

== Governors and grand seneschals, within France ==
=== Governors ===
- 1481–1483 Palamède de Forbin
- 1491–1493 François de Luxembourg

=== Grand seneschals ===
- 1480–1481 Pierre de La Jaille (see Château de Ranton)
- 1482–1483 Raymond de Glandevès-Faucon
- 1483 Palamède de Forbin
- 1485–1493 Aymar de Poitiers, Count of Valentinois

=== Governors – grand seneschals ===
- 1493–1503 Philip of Hachberg-Sausenberg, margrave de Hochberg
- 1504–1513 Louis d'Orléans, Count of Longueville
- 1514 Jean de Poitiers, lord of Saint-Vallier
- 1515–1525 René of Savoy, Count of Tende
- 1525–1566 Claude de Savoie, Count of Tende
- 1566–1572 Honorat I de Savoie, Count of Tende

=== Grand seneschals ===
- 1572–1582 Jean V de Pontevès, Count of Carcès
- 1582–1610 Gaspard de Pontevès, Count of Carcès
- 1610–1655 Jean de Pontevès, Count of Carcès
- 1655–1662 François de Simiane-Gordes

=== Governors ===
- 1572–1573 Gaspard de Saulx-Tavannes
- 1573–1578 Albert de Gondi, comte de Retz
- 1578–1579 François de La Baume
- 1579–1586 Henri d'Angoulême, called, Henri, bâtard de Valois
- 1586–1590 Jean-Louis de Nogaret, duc d'Épernon
- 1590-1592 Bernard de Nogaret, seigneur de La Valette.
- 1592-1594 Jean-Louis de Nogaret, duc d'Épernon
- 1592–1594 Gaspard de Pontevès, comte de Carcès (the Catholic League counter appointment to the office).
- 1594–1631 Charles de Lorraine, duc de Guise
- 1631–1637 Nicolas de L'Hôpital, marquis de Vitry
- 1637–1653 Louis-Emmanuel de Valois, comte d'Alais
- 1653–1669 Louis de Bourbon-Vendôme, duc de Mercœur
- 1669–1712 Louis-Joseph de Bourbon, duc de Vendôme
- 1712–1734 Claude-Louis-Hector, duc de Villars
- 1734–1770 Honoré-Armand, duc de Villars
- 1770–1780 Camille-Louis de Lorraine
- 1780–1790 Charles-Just de Beauvau

In 1790, the French Revolution definitively ended the governorship.

== See also ==
- List of rulers of Provence
- List of consorts of Provence

== Sources ==
- Atlas historique de la Provence, p 132
- Jean Duquesne, Dictionnaire des Gouverneurs de Province (2002), p. 185–190. Paris: éditions Christian. ISBN 2864960990

== Sources ==
- Harding, Robert (1978). Anatomy of a Power Elite: the Provincial Governors in Early Modern France. Yale University Press.
- Jouanna, Arlette (1998). Histoire et Dictionnaire des Guerres de Religion. Bouquins.
