= Marie Jeanne de Talleyrand-Périgord =

French court official (1747–1792)

- Duchess of Mailly
- Full name: Marie Jeanne de Talleyrand-Périgord
- Born: 14 August 1747; Versailles
- Died: 19 January 1792 (aged 44)
- Spouses: Louis Marie, Count of Mailly, Duke of Mailly (1762)
- Father: Hélie Charles de Talleyrand-Périgord, Count of Périgord
- Mother: Marie Francoise de Talleyrand-Périgord

Marie Jeanne de Talleyrand-Périgord (1747-1792) was a French court official. She served as the dame d'atour to Queen Marie Antoinette from 1775 to 1781.

She was the daughter of Hélie Charles de Talleyrand-Périgord, Count of Périgord (1726-1797) and Marie Françoise Marguerite de Talleyrand-Périgord, and married Duke Louis Marie de Mailly (1744-1795). Duke of Mailly She was appointed lady-in-waiting to Marie Antoinette in 1770, and became dame d'atour in 1775. During her tenure, the costs of Marie Antoinette's wardrobe raised to enormous levels. In contrast to her predecessor, Laure Auguste de Fitz-James, Princess of Chimay, Mailly does not seem to have curbed this development. Her successor, Geneviève d'Ossun, started work to reduce the costs of the queen's wardrobe.

Court offices
Preceded by Laure-Auguste de Chimay	Dame d'atour to the Queen of France; 1775–1781	Succeeded by Geneviève d'Ossun
