= Paul-Hippolyte de Beauvilliers, Duke of Saint-Aignan =

French diplomat and soldier

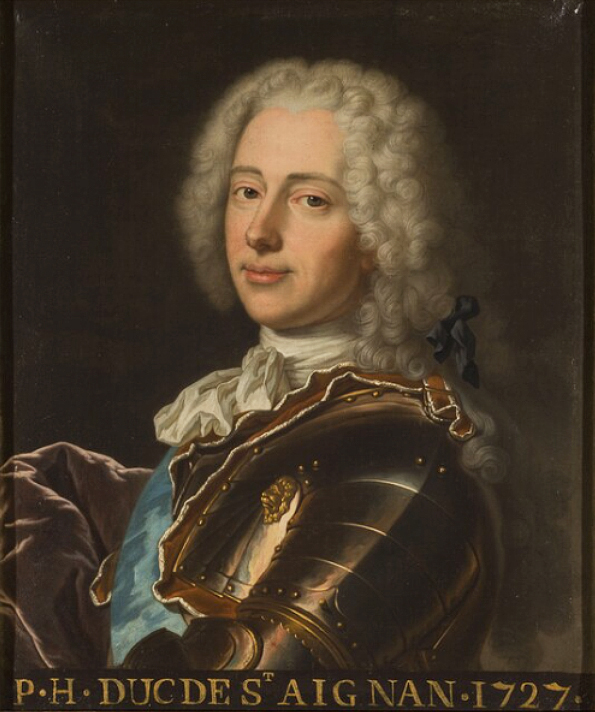

Paul-Hippolyte de Beauvilliers, Duke of Saint-Aignan (15 November 1684, in Paris – 22 January 1776, in Paris) was a French diplomat, soldier, chevalier des ordres du Roi and peer of France.

== Family ==
Coat of arms of the Beauvilliers family, Dukes of Saint-Aignan

He was the son of François Honorat de Beauvilliers, 1st Duke of Saint-Aignan and of Antoinette Servien and the half brother of Paul de Beauvilliers, 2nd Duke of Saint-Aignan.

== Life ==
He served as ambassador to Spain (where in 1716 he accompanied don Philip to the baptismal font in the name of France), then as a member of the Regency council in 1719, governor of Le Havre and ambassador extraordinary to Rome in 1731. He was elected a member of the Académie Française in 1726 and of the Académie des inscriptions in 1732.

== See also ==
- Duke of Saint-Aignan
