= Amable Gabrielle de Noailles =

French court official

- Duchess of Villars
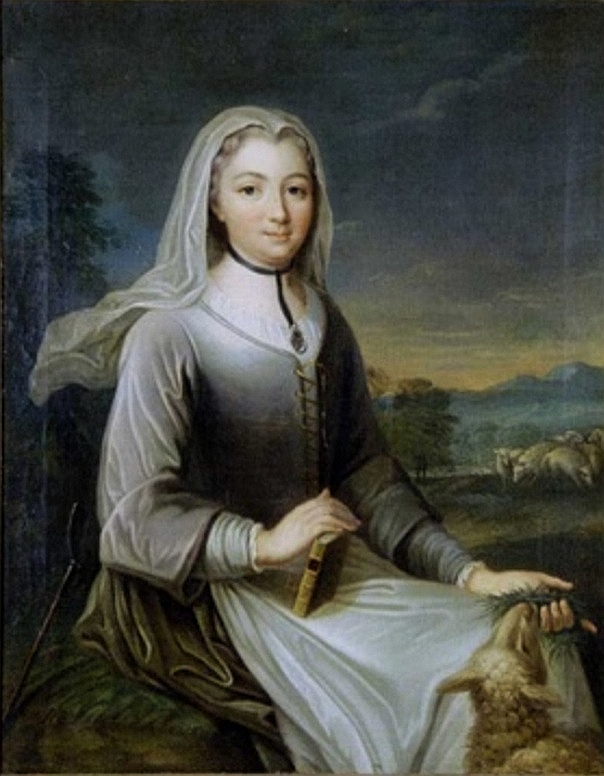
- Full name: Amable Gabrielle de Noailles
- Born: 18 February 1706
- Died: 1771 (aged 65)
- Spouses: Honoré Armand de Villars, Duke of Villars (1721)
- Issue: Amable Angélique, Duchess of Bisaccia
- Father: Adrien Maurice de Noailles, Duke of Noailles
- Mother: Françoise Charlotte d'Aubigné

Amable Gabrielle de Noailles, Duchess of Villars (18 February 1706 – 1771), was a French court official. She served as the dame d'atour to queen Marie Leszczyńska from 1742 to 1768, and to queen Marie Antoinette from 1770 to 1771.

== Life ==
She was the daughter of Adrien Maurice de Noailles, Duke of Noailles and Françoise Charlotte d'Aubigné and married, in 1721, to Honoré Armand de Villars, Duke of Villars. She had no children with her husband, who was homosexual, but did have one daughter with Jean Philippe d'Orléans, himself the son of Philippe II, duc d'Orléans and Marie Louise Madeleine Victoire Bel de La Boissière d'Argenton. Named Amable Angélique de Villars (1723-1771), she was accepted by her husband and raised as his daughter.

She was appointed dame du palais to the charitable Queen Marie Leszczyńska in 1727 and became one of her close friends and confidant and often assisted Marie on her numerous philanthropic work outside Versailles such as giving alms to the poor and visiting the sick in the various parishes. In 1742, the queen managed to convince the chief minister to Louis XV, André-Hercule de Fleury, to have de Villars promoted to dame d'atour, after Françoise de Mazarin's death, in order to avoid the office being filled by Marie Anne de Mailly, duchess of Châteauroux. However, Mailly did secure de Villars' former office of dame du palais.

In 1768, de Villars and the rest of the Queen's household were allowed to retain their offices after her death and resumed them in the household of Marie Antoinette upon her arrival in France in 1770. By then, however, she was too old to manage her office and, during her tenure, the dauphine's household was drained of assets.

In 1923, a book entitled Le roman de la "Sainte Duchesse" : lettres inédites de la duchesse de Villars au comte d'Argenson (1738-1741) about her was published.

Court offices
Preceded by Françoise de Mailly	Dame d'atour to the Queen of France; 1742–1771	Succeeded by Adélaïde Diane de Cossé
