= Honoré Armand de Villars, 2nd Duke of Villars =

French nobleman

Honoré Armand de Villars
- 2nd Duke of Villars
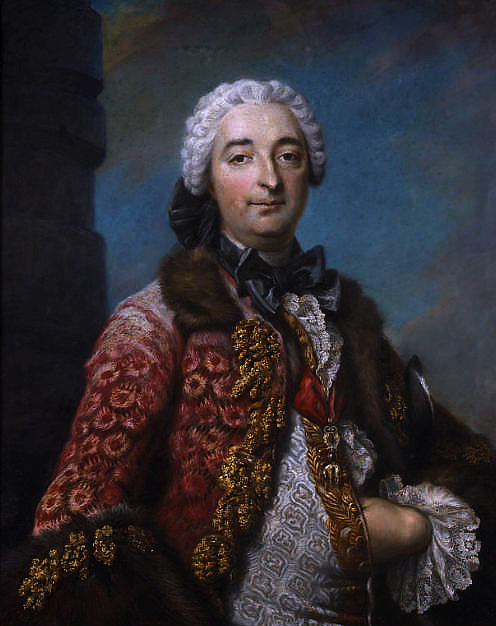
- Villars in circa 1745.
- Full name: Honoré Armand de Villars
- Born: 4 October 1702; Paris, France
- Died: May 1770 (aged 67); Hôtel de Villars, d'Aix, France
- Spouse: Amable Gabrielle de Noailles
- Issue: Aimable Angélique de Villars
- Father: Claude Louis Hector de Villars
- Mother: Jeanne Angélique Rocque

Don Honoré Armand de Villars, 2nd Duke of Villars (4 October 1702, Paris – May 1770, Aix), Duke and Peer of France, Prince of Martigues, Grandee of Spain, Knight of the Golden Fleece, Viscount of Melun, Marquis of la Melle, Count of Rochemiley, was a French nobleman, soldier and politician.

== Life ==
=== Early life ===
He was the son of Claude Louis Hector de Villars and of Jeanne Angélique Rocque, and the grandson of Pierre de Villars. In 1721, he married Amable-Gabrielle de Villars, daughter of Adrien Maurice de Noailles. They had only one child, Aimable-Angélique de Villars, on 18 March 1723. Maître de Camp of a cavalry regiment and Brigadier in the Armées du Roi, he served in Italy in 1733 under his father's command. He carried back to Louis XIV the news of the capture of Milan castle. He was a member of the Académie française, succeeding his father in seat 18 on 16 August 1734.

He received the nickname "friend of Man" as a famous homosexual. Bachaumont noted, in his Mémoires (5 May 1770) that "[the Duke of Villars] was taxed with a vice that he had made fashionable at court, and that had brought him very wide renown, as can be seen in la Pucelle". Voltaire, in the first editions of La Pucelle d'Orléans, mentioned him alongside the marquis de Thibouville, accused of the same vice, in the following verses:

Such has been seen, Thibouville and Villars,

Imitators of the first of the Caesars,
All inflamed by the fire they possessed,
Head lowered, attending on a Nicomedes;
And seconding, by frequent gaps,
The valiant blows of their Picard lackeys.

=== Life in Provence ===
He succeeded his father as Gouverneur général des pays et comté de Provence and of la Tour du Bouc, holding that post from 1734 until his death. He lived in Provence, where he was protector of the Académie de Marseille, and rarely came to the Académie française despite his seat on it. Even so, he was a friend of Voltaire, D'Alembert and Duclos.

In 1750, as governor of Provence, he bought the Hôtel d'Esmivy de Moissac, a hôtel particulier on what is the Cours Mirabeau. The hôtel had been built in 1710 by Lois d'Esmivy de Moissac, councillor to the Cour des Comptes on a prestige parcel of land, meant since 1664 for a "hôtel du gouvernement". However the Duke of Vendôme, the Governor to whom the parcel was given, finally preferred the isolation of the faubourg des Cordeliers, where he built his Pavillon Vendôme. The façade was completed in 1757, for the duke of Villars, by Georges Vallon : its four columns, surrounding a monumental entrance, were (with those of the Hôtel de Ville and University) the only ones that encroached on municipal space - the mark and privilege of the governor. Its staircase is adorned with the Villars coats-of-arms (stolen in 1980). From then on it was known as the Hôtel de Villars.

However, Honoré Armand mostly lived in Marseille and rarely came to Aix, where he was little-welcomed by the people and the notables, particularly by the Parlement of Aix-en-Provence. This ostracism was not due to his manners, common in that era, but due to the fact that he represented the king and did not waive any of the civil privileges that came with that role. This regal attitude irked a somewhat rebellious province that had only recently been joined to France, where Mirabeau was elected as representative of the Third Estate. However, by his will of 27 June 1765, Honoré Armand left the town of Aix-en-Provence an important sum for the creation of a public library, a public gardens, a cabinet of antiquities and medals and a school of drawing. That school was immediately installed in the Chapelle des Dames, a dependent of the Collège Bourbon. He also left a statue of his father by the sculptor Nicolas Coustou for the hall of the public library - this sculpture was closed in the Benedictine convent after the French Revolution and was forgotten until 1812, when it was put at the top of the grand staircase of the Hôtel de ville.

His daughter, widowed soon after her marriage, ended her days in a convent and so Honoré Armand de Villars had no descendants in the male line.
