= Pierre Paul d'Ossun =

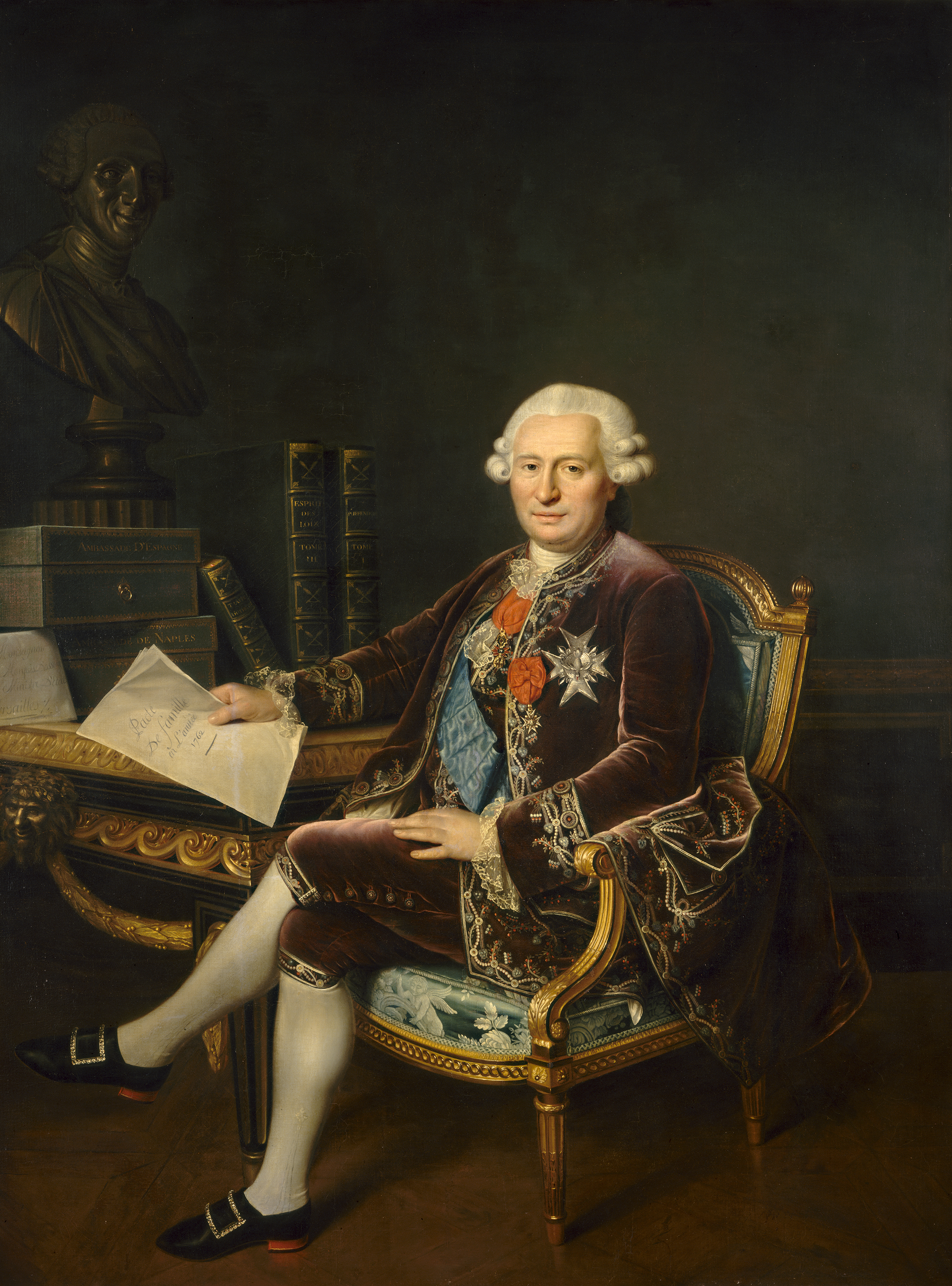
The Marquis d'Ossun, holding the third Pacte de famille by César Van Loo, around 1780

Pierre Paul, marquis d'Ossun (29 January 1713 – 20 March 1788) was a French diplomat and Grandee of Spain.

== Biography ==
He was the son of Gaspard, marquis d'Ossun (1675–1721) and Marie Charlotte de Pas (1689–1759).

In 1744-1745 he was a Capitain-lieutenant in the Cavalerie de la Gendarmerie. Promoted to brigadier in 1747, he would become a maréchal de camp in 1761.
In 1751 he entered the diplomatic corps to become the French ambassador to the Kingdom of the Two Sicilies. From 1759 to 1777, d'Ossun was French ambassador in Madrid.

His appointment as Ambassador in Madrid coincided with the death of King Ferdinand VI of Spain and the ascension to the throne of King Charles III of Spain, who was until King of the Two Sicilies. It was in fact at the request of Charles III, who appreciated d'Ossun as Ambassador in the Two Sicilies, that d'Ossun followed him to Madrid.

In Madrid, d'Ossun played an important role in the conclusion of the 3rd Pacte de Famille between France and Spain, which led to Spain participating in the Seven Years' War. During his 18 years stay in Madrid, he became a Grandee of Spain and received the Order of the Golden Fleece.

After his return to France, Louis XVI appointed him in 1778 minister in the Council of State, and awarded him the Order of the Holy Spirit.

=== Marriage and children ===
d'Ossun married 3 times. All his wives died very young. Only his third wife Louise Thérèse Hocquart delivered a son :

- Charles Pierre Hyacinthe d'Ossun (1750–1790) who married Geneviève de Gramont, Première dame d'honneur to Queen Marie Antoinette.

== Sources ==
- Histoire de l'Europe
