= Paul de Beauvilliers, 2nd duc de Saint-Aignan =

French government official (1648–1714)

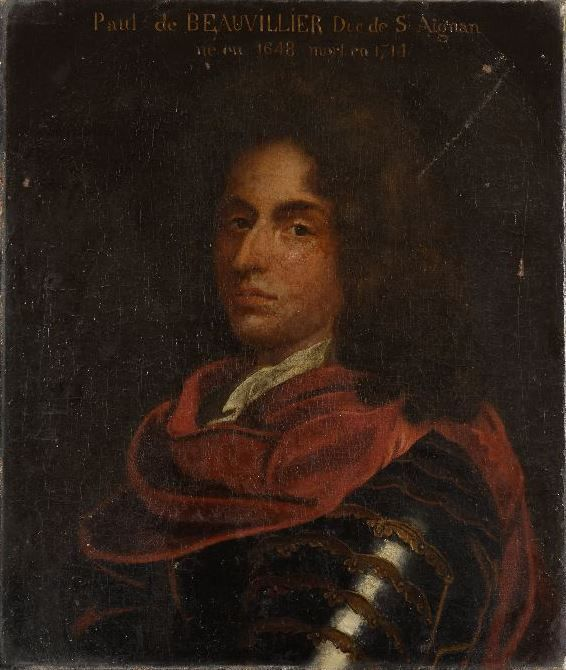

Paul de Beauvilliers (French pronunciation: [pɔl də bovilje]), count and later (1679) 2nd duc de Saint-Aignan (1648–1714), often referred to as the duc de Beauvilliers, was a French government official under King Louis XIV.

== Biography ==
Born in Saint-Aignan (then in the Berry province, now in the Loir-et-Cher département), he was the son of François de Beauvilliers, 1st duc de Saint-Aignan and brother of Anne Marie de Bethune. His half-brother was Paul-Hippolyte de Beauvilliers, 3rd duc de Saint-Aignan. As First Gentleman of the King's Bedchamber (Premier gentilhomme de la Chambre du roi) in 1666 (a high privilege whose recipient was in charge of ordering the servants and the doorkeepers attending the king in his public bedroom), he had daily access to Louis XIV with whom he could discuss personal and private matters. He married Henriette-Louise Colbert, the second daughter of Colbert in 1671, thereby becoming the brother-in-law of Charles Honoré d'Albert, duc de Luynes. Both were friends of Louis de Rouvroy, duc de Saint-Simon and important characters of the Saint-Simon Mémoirs.

Chairman of the Royal Council of Finances (conseil royal des Finances) in 1685, he became the governor of the Duke of Burgundy (1689), the duke of Anjou (1690), and the duke of Berry (1693), thus being in charge of the education of the three grandsons of Louis XIV.

In 1691 he entered the Council of Ministers (Conseil d'en haut), chaired by the king himself where matters of state policy were decided including religion, diplomacy, and war. He was the voice of the dévot party that advocated finding a peaceful end to France's and Louis XIV's interminable wars.

In 1697, he ordered the intendants (heads of the royal administration in the provinces) to conduct a general survey whose conclusions, known as the Mémoires, offer an interesting portrayal of France in the very end of the 17th century.

Close to the duke of Burgundy, his pupil and heir to the throne, he was one of the reformists who advocated a less centralized and absolute monarchy, and whose ideas of polysynody were briefly applied after 1715, although he did not live long enough to see it.

The duc de Beauvilliers died in Vaucresson, near Versailles, in 1714, one year before Louis XIV.

He was Knight in the Order of the Holy Spirit and the Order of the Golden Fleece.

== Bibliography ==
The only biography of Beauvilliers is by Georges Lizerand, Le duc de Beauvillier 1648-1714 published in 1933.

== See also ==
- Duke of Saint-Aignan

French nobility
Preceded by François de Beauvilliers	Duke of Saint-Aignan; 1687 – 1714	Succeeded by Paul-Hippolyte de Beauvilliers
