= Geneviève d'Ossun =

French courtier

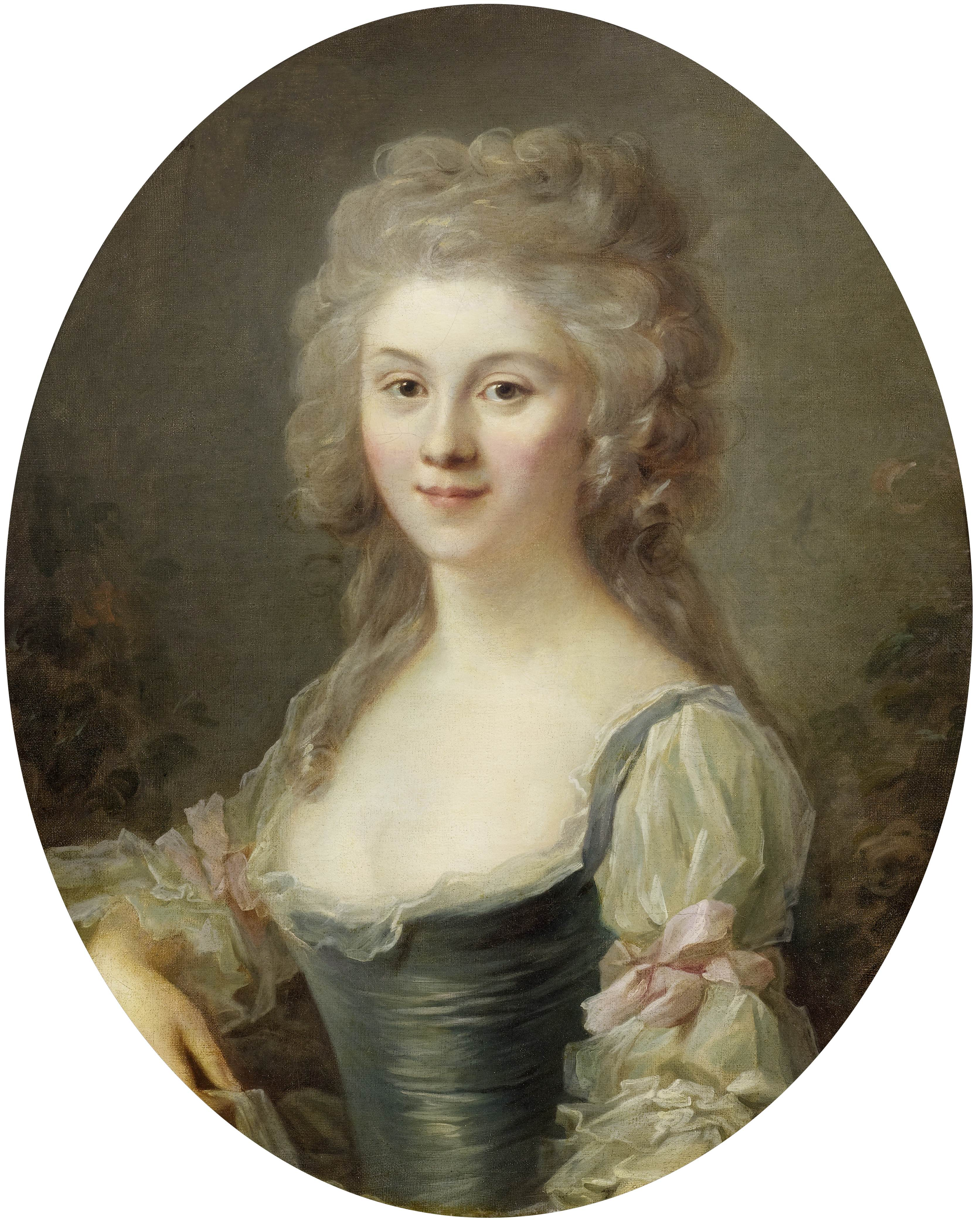
Geneviève d'Ossun

Geneviève d'Ossun, Countess d'Ossun (Paris, 1751 – 26 July 1794, Paris) was a French courtier who served as dame d'atour to the queen of France, Marie Antoinette, from 1781 until 1791, and as première dame d'honneur from 1791 until 1792.

== Life ==
She was the daughter of Count Antoine-Adrien-Charles de Gramont, the niece of Étienne François de Choiseul, duc de Choiseul, and — through her brother Antoine de Gramont — sister-in-law to Aglaé de Polignac, daughter of Yolande de Polastron, duchesse de Polignac. She married Marquis Charles d'Ossun, son of Pierre Paul d'Ossun in 1766, and was introduced at court after her wedding.

=== Court service ===
On 26 May 1781, she was appointed dame d'atour to the queen in succession to Marie-Jeanne de Talleyrand-Périgord, duchesse de Mailly, who retired for health reasons. As dame d'atour, she was the supervisor of the wardrobe and dressing ceremony of the queen. Reportedly, she attempted to subdue the enormous costs of the queen's wardrobe at that time, both by opposing the habit of the fashionable merchants to overcharge the queen, but also by suggesting to Marie Antoinette herself to cut down on her expenses. This was not well received, but she eventually managed to win the queen's confidence.

According to French historian and Marie Antoinette biographer, Pierre de Nolhac, it took some time for Geneviève d'Ossun to win the confidence of Marie Antoinette, as she lacked the beauty and wit of Yolande de Polastron, duchesse de Polignac. She was somewhat of a contrast to the seductiveness of the queen's favorite, but had a solid character and lacked far-reaching ambitions. She eventually managed to convince Marie Antoinette to cut down somewhat on her everyday expenses. She was not rich, but did support herself on her salary. She is not known to have asked for favors, for either herself or others, and was reportedly pleased with being in service of the queen.

In 1785, Auguste Marie Raymond d'Arenberg, comte de la Marck, observed in a letter to the Marquis de Mirabeau, that Marie Antoinette often attended intimate suppers, with concert, in the presence of only four or five people at the apartment of Geneviève d'Ossun, and that she was apparently more at ease there than with Yolande de Polastron, duchesse de Polignac.

=== Revolution ===
After the Women's March on Versailles, d'Ossun attended court in the Tuileries Palace from her palace in Rue de Grenelle in Paris. When Laure-Auguste de Fitz-James, princesse de Chimay, emigrated in early 1791, she was promoted to succeed her as première dame d'honneur and thus formally made second in command of the queen's female courtiers. On 21 June, she was alerted about the Flight to Varennes by the queen, and left Paris for her estate in the countryside. She was suspected and questioned for being implicit in the flight, but was acquitted and returned to her court service.

d'Ossun lost her position through the abolition of the monarchy, and thereby the royal court and household, following the storming of the Tuileries Palace by armed revolutionaries in the Insurrection of 10 August 1792, and returned to private life. During the Reign of Terror, d'Ossun was arrested and imprisoned at the Maison des Oiseaux. She was charged with conspiracy to conceal the crimes Marie Antoinette had been convicted of and of neglecting to report these crimes. She was called before the court on 25 July and judged guilty as charged. In accordance with the Law of 22 Prairial, she was sentenced to execution by guillotine the following day. According to a co-prisoner, who had not been sentenced to death, she behaved with courage during her trial.

The protocol stated: "Age 44, born and resident of Paris, the widow d'Osson, a former noblewoman and Marechale, previously the lady-in-waiting of the widow Capet, was sentenced to death on the 8 Thermidor the Year II in Paris by the Revolutionary Court as conspirator."

Court offices
Preceded by Marie-Jeanne de Mailly	Dame d'atour 1781–1791	Succeeded by Émilie de Beauharnais
Preceded by Laure-Auguste de Chimay	Première dame d'honneur 1791–1792	Succeeded by Adélaïde de La Rochefoucauld
