= Saint-Agnan =

Saint-Agnan is the name or part of the name of several communes in France:

- Saint-Agnan, Aisne
- Saint-Agnan, Saône-et-Loire
- Saint-Agnan, Tarn
- Saint-Agnan, Yonne
- Saint-Agnan-de-Cernières, in the Eure département
- Saint-Agnan-en-Morvan, in the Nièvre département
- Saint-Agnan-en-Vercors, in the Drôme département
- Saint-Agnan-le-Malherbe, in the Calvados département
- Saint-Agnan-sur-Erre, in the Orne département
- Saint-Agnan-sur-Sarthe, in the Orne département
