= François de Beauvilliers, 1st duc de Saint-Aignan =

17th century French aristocrat

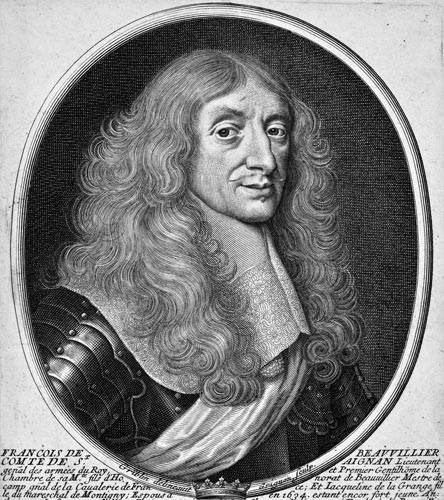
François-Honorat de Beauvilliers, 1st duc de Saint-Aignan.

François-Honorat de Beauvilliers, 1st duc de Saint-Aignan (30 October 1607 – 16 June 1687), born in Paris, was a French military leader, administrator and man of letters. He was peer of France and a member of the Académie française.

== Biography ==
He was the son of Honorat de Beauvilliers, comte de Saint-Aignan (1579–1622) and of Jacqueline de La Grange d'Arquian.

After having been through the campaigns in Germany (1634–1635), Franche-Comté (1636), and Flanders (1637), was sent to the Bastille in consequence of his having lost the Battle of Thionville in 1640. In reward for his devotion to the court party during the Fronde, his county of Saint-Aignan was elevated to a dukedom in 1663, with the special privilege of the peerage (duché-pairie), making him one of the highest ranking aristocrats of the kingdom of France.

Beauvilliers was famous by his protection of writers and literary people, as well as by his military skills and services. He entered the Académie française in 1663.

The 1st duc de Saint-Aignan died in Paris in 1687. He was the father of the influential duc de Beauvilliers, as well as Anne Marie de Bethune.

== See also ==
- Duke of Saint-Aignan

French nobility
New creation	Duke of Saint-Aignan; 1663 – 1687	Succeeded by Paul de Beauvilliers
