= Saint-Aignan, Loir-et-Cher =

Saint-Aignan sur Cher
- Commune
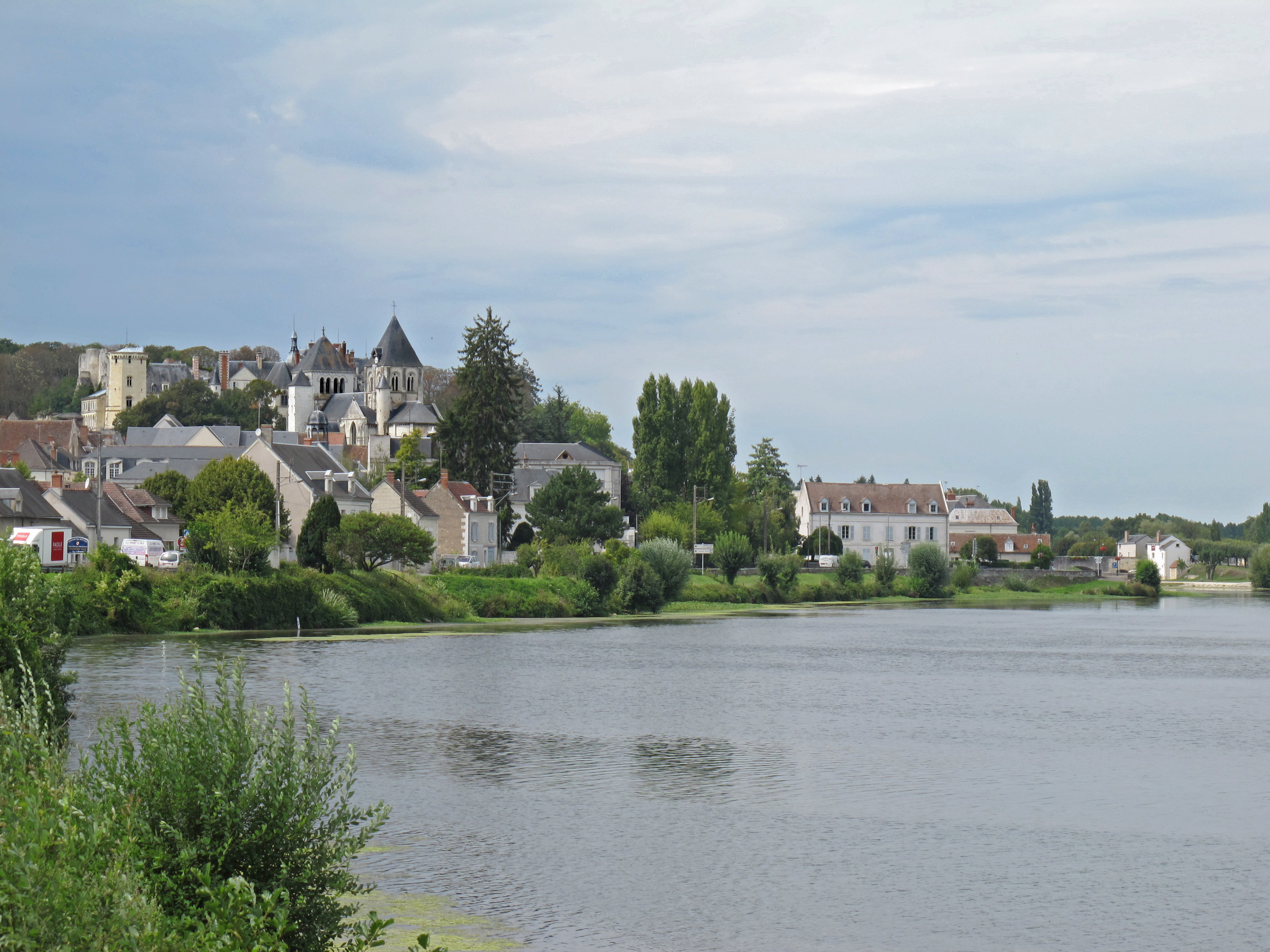
- Saint-Aignan seen from the bank of the river Cher

- Coat of arms
- Location of Saint-Aignan sur Cher
- Location within France Location within Centre-Val de Loire
- Coordinates: 47°16′10″N 1°22′36″E
- Country: France
- Region: Centre-Val de Loire
- Department: Loir-et-Cher
- Arrondissement: Romorantin-Lanthenay
- Canton: Saint-Aignan

Government
  - Mayor (2020–2026): Éric Carnat
- Area^{1}: 18.48 km^{2} (7.14 sq mi)
- Elevation: 115 m (377 ft)
- Highest elevation: 164 m (538 ft)
- Lowest elevation: 64 m (210 ft)
- Population (2023): 2,789
  - Density: 150.9/km^{2} (390.9/sq mi)
- Time zone: UTC+01:00 (CET)
  - Summer (DST): UTC+02:00 (CEST)
- INSEE/Postal code: 41198 /41110
- ^{1} French Land Register data, which excludes lakes, ponds, glaciers > 1 km^{2} (0.386 sq mi or 247 acres) and river estuaries.

Saint-Aignan (French pronunciation: [sɛ̃.t‿ɛɲɑ̃]), also unofficially Saint-Aignan-sur-Cher (French pronunciation: [sɛ̃.t‿ɛɲɑ̃ syʁ ʃɛʁ], literally Saint-Aignan on Cher) is a commune and town in the Loir-et-Cher department in the administrative region of Centre-Val de Loire, France.

== Geography ==
Saint-Aignan is located on the river Cher, and is around 35 km (about 21,75 mi) south of Blois.

== Population ==
Historical population

Year	Pop.	±% p.a.
1793	2,341	—
1821	2,845	+0.70%
1846	3,146	+0.40%
1872	3,393	+0.29%
1901	3,208	−0.19%
1926	2,768	−0.59%
1946	2,649	−0.22%
1962	3,029	+0.84%
1968	3,445	+2.17%

Year	Pop.	±% p.a.
1975	3,602	+0.64%
1982	3,600	−0.01%
1990	3,672	+0.25%
1999	3,542	−0.40%
2007	3,209	−1.23%
2012	2,993	−1.38%
2017	2,849	−0.98%
2023	2,789	−0.35%

Source: EHESS and INSEE (1968-2023)

== Features ==
Saint-Aignan is known for its quiet nature, its gastronomic products, its castle and church and also its history. In the commune is located the ZooParc de Beauval.

== See also ==
- Communes of the Loir-et-Cher department
