= Gabrielle de Rochechouart, dame de Lansac =

French noblewoman

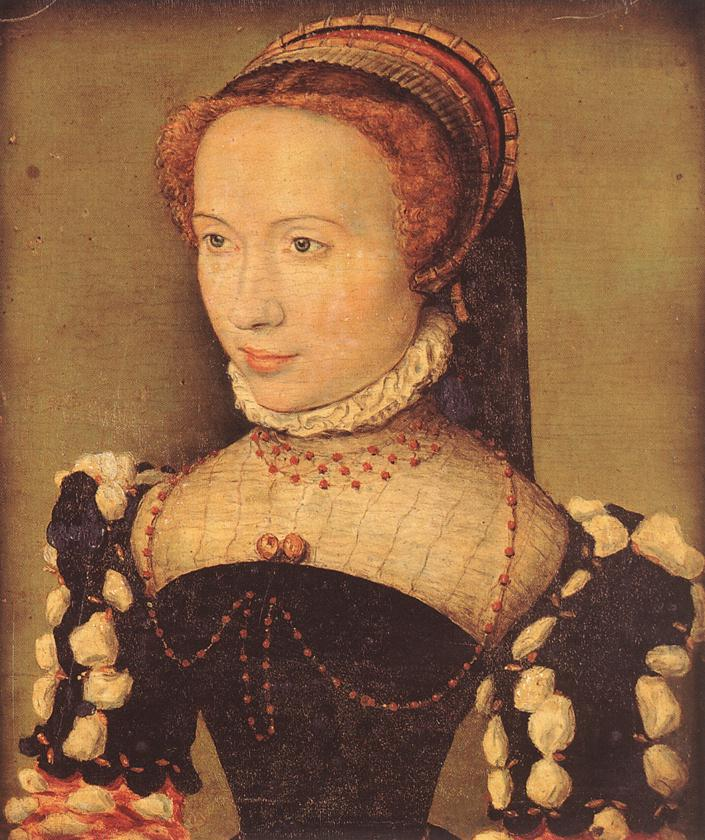
Gabrielle de Rochechouart by Corneille de Lyon at Chantilly, Condé Museum

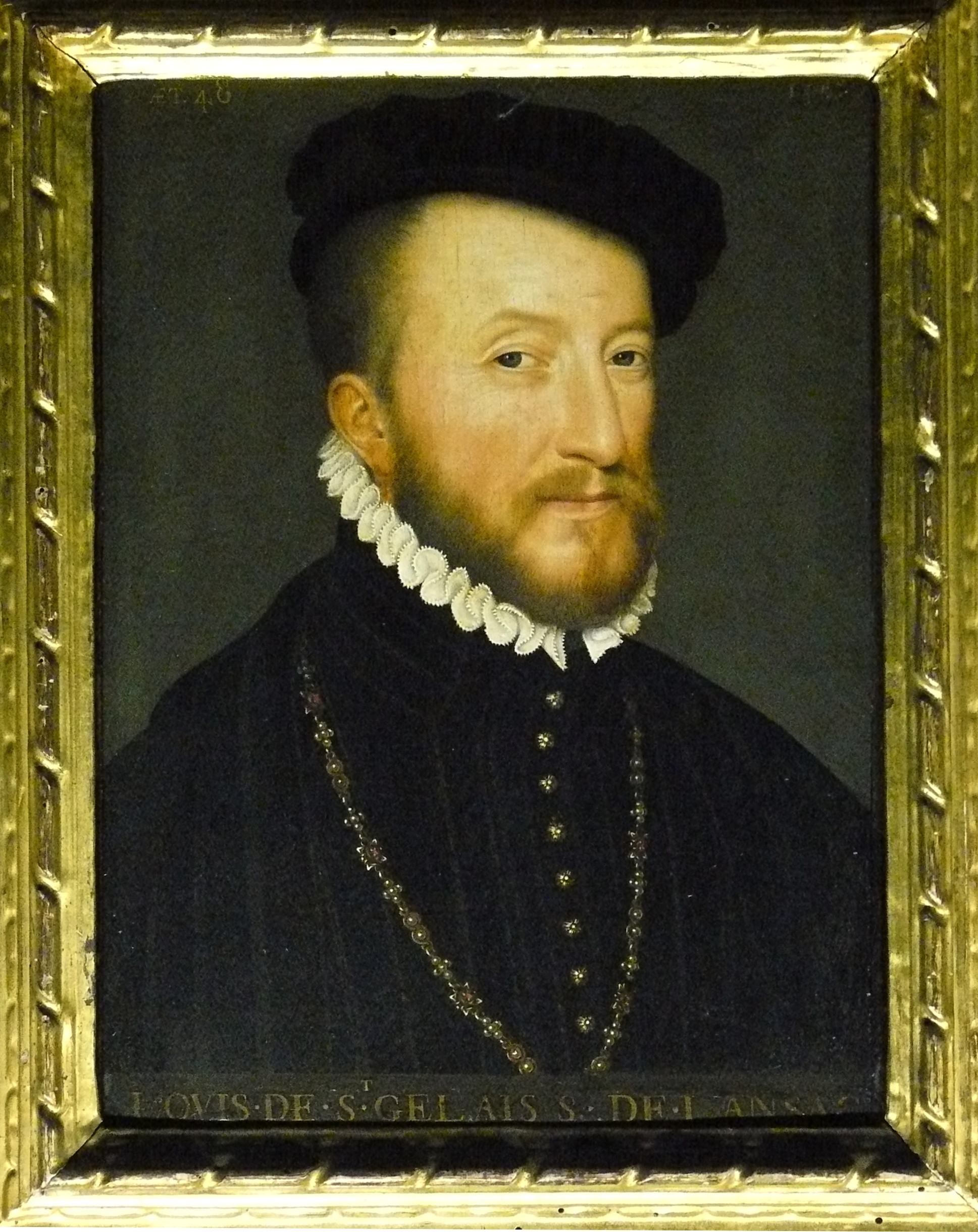
Louis de Lusignan de Saint-Gelais, Seigneur de Lansac, by Atelier de François Clouet. In the Louvre

Gabrielle de Rochechouart, dame de Lansac (27 October 1530 – 1580), was a lady-in-waiting, a Dame d'honneur or Dame du Palais to Catherine de' Medici.

== Life ==
She was the wife of Louis de Saint-Gelais, the seigneur de Lanssac (1515/13–1589), Seigneur de Lansac, Baron of La Motte Saint-Héray and of Précy. He was the natural son of King François I and his mistress Jacquette de Lansac, wife of Alexandre Saint-Gelais.

Louis, Seigneur de Lansac, was State Councilor, Ambassador in 1554, captain of 100 men-at-arms, knight of the order of Saint-Michel on September and knight of the order of the Holy Spirit. Gabrielle was the niece of Aimery de Rochechouart, bishop of Sisteron, who had succeeded his uncle Albin de Rochechouart in that position.

Her parents were François de Rochechouart (b. 25 December 1502), Baron de Mortemart, Seigneur de Tonnay-Charente and Vivonne, knight of the order of the king, and Renée Taveau, only daughter and heiress of Leon Taveau, Baron de Mortemer, and Jeanne Frotier. Gabrielle's parents' marriage took place on 16 November 1509, when her father was seven years old. Gabrielle herself was either 16 (N.S.) or 17 (O.S.) at her first marriage to François de Goulaines, Seigneur de Martigné-Brittard. The marriage contract is dated 13 February 1547. (Note: France changed New Year's Day to 1 January from 1564. Previously France had counted various days as New Year's Day: Christmas, Easter-eve, 25 March (Lady Day).) Her second marriage, by contract dated 9 March 1558, was to François de Volvire, Chevalier, Baron de Ruffec, Vicomte du Bois-de-la-Roche, the son of René de Volvire, Baron de Ruffec and Catherine de Montauban, his first wife. Gabrielle's third and last marriage, to Louis de Saint-Gelais the seigneur de Lanssac, took place on 8 October 1565. Her sister Madeleine married in 1554 Baudouin de Goulaines, the brother of her sister's first husband.

== Portraits ==
Like her royal mistress Catherine de' Medici and fellow ladies-in-waiting Fulvia Pico della Mirandola, Comtesse de Randan and Louise d'Halluin, dame de Cipierre, Gabrielle de Rochechouart, dame de Lansac was the subject of several portraits famous today. Attributed to Corneille de Lyon, the workshop of Corneille de Lyon, or the school of Corneille de Lyon, two are today at the Musée Conde, while one is at the Frick art Museum, Pennsylvania. The painting now in the Frick Art Museum, Pennsylvania, was once known as Lady Jane Grey. Lee Porritt writes that a similar copy also with the blue background with an inscription and a plaque identifying the sitter as Gabrielle de Rochechouart, Dame de Lansac had been donated in 1897 to The Musée Condé by Henri d’Orléans, Duke of Aumale along with other paintings from the Duke of Sutherland's collection.

== Gallery ==
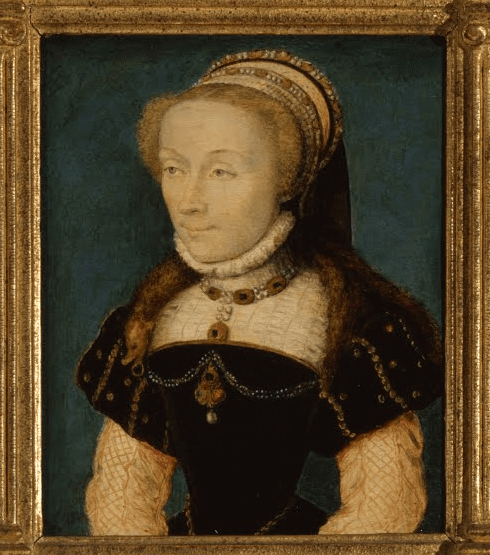
Gabrielle de Rochechouart, dame de Lansac by Corneille de Lyon, in the Frick Art Museum, Pennsylvania

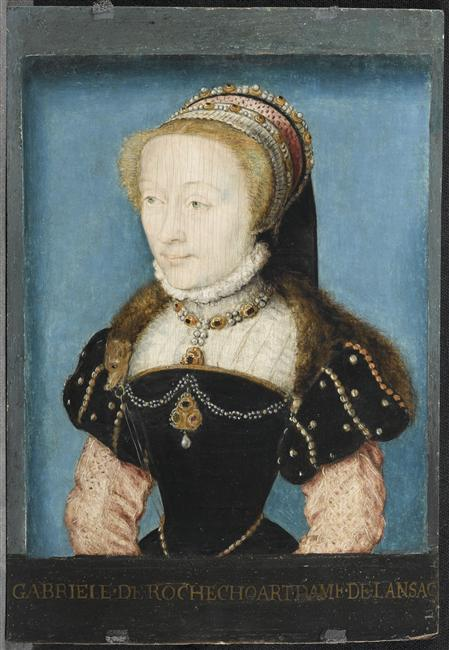
Gabrielle de Rochechouart by Corneille de Lyon at The Musée Condé
