= Dame du Palais =

Historical office in the royal court of France

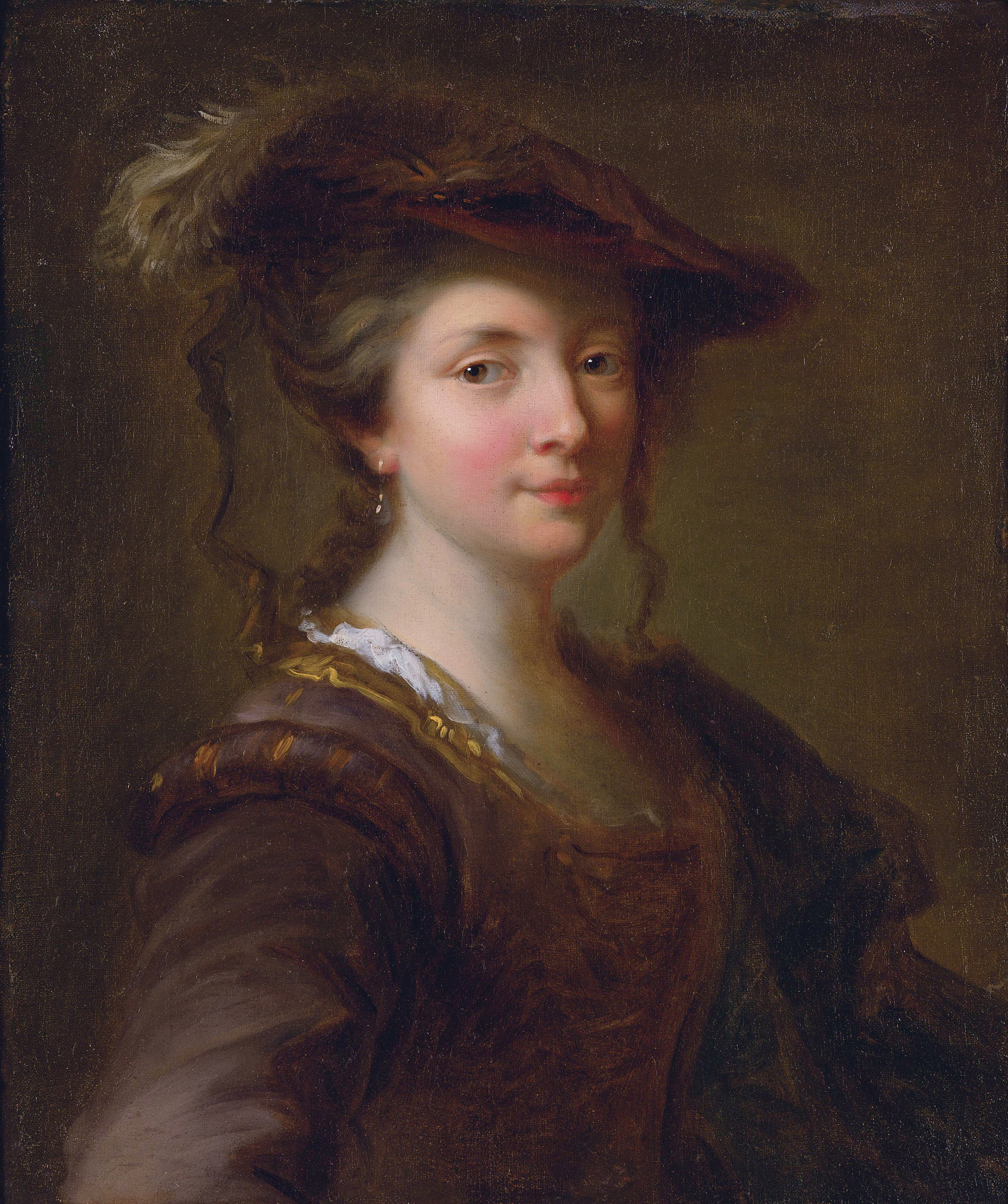
Louise Julie de Mailly-Nesle, Comtesse de Mailly, by Alexis Grimou. She served as Dame du Palais to Queen Marie Leszczyńska.

The Dame du Palais (French pronunciation: [dam dy palɛ], lit. 'Lady of the Palace'), originally only Dame, was a historical office in the royal court of France. It was a title of a lady-in-waiting holding the official position of personal attendant on a female member of the French royal family. The position was traditionally held by a female member of a noble family. They were ranked between the dame d'atours and the Fille d'honneur. They had previously been styled 'Dames'.

The equivalent title and office has historically been used in most European royal courts (Dutch: Dames du Palais; English: Lady of the Bedchamber; German: Hofstaatsdame or Palatsdame; Italian: Dame di Corte; Russian: Hofdame or Statsdame; Spanish: Dueña de honor; Swedish: Statsfru). The same title has been used for the equivalent position in the courts of Belgium, Greece and the Netherlands.

== History ==
=== Dame and Dame d'honneur ===
Initially, the married ladies-in-waiting who attended the queen of France had the title Dame. This was simply the title of a married lady-in-waiting, who was not the principal lady-in-waiting.

From 1523, the group of 'Dame', (married) ladies-in-waiting who attended the court as companions of the queen had the formal title Dame d'honneur ('Lady of Honour', commonly only 'Dame'), hence the title 'Première dame d'honneur' ('First lady of honour') to distinguish between the principal lady-in-waiting and the group of remaining common (married) ladies-in-waiting. They were third in rank below the Dame d'atours, and above the unmarried Fille d'honneur ('maid of honour').

=== Dame du Palais ===
In 1674, the position of Fille d'honneur was abolished, and the 'Dames' were renamed Dame du Palais.

The Dame du Palais were appointed from the highest ranked nobility of France. Only married women were selected. Their task was function as companions to the queen and attend functions as a part of her entourage. The number were in 1674 set at twelve.

The position was abolished with the introduction of the Republic in 1792. It was revived during the First Empire, with the same original position as the title of a married lady-in-waiting below the 'Première dame d'honneur'. It was last used during the Second Empire.

== List of Dame du Palais to the Queens and Empresses of France ==
This is an incomplete list of those who have served as Dame du Palais to the Queen or Empress of France. They also include those prior to 1674, who had the title Dame (formally Dame d'honneur), because it was the same position under different names. The office was normally shared between twelve women, who served in parallel. If additional Dame du Palais was appointed above the number twelve, they were normally named Dame du palais surnuméraire.

=== Dame (-d'honneur) to Eleanor of Austria 1532–1547 ===
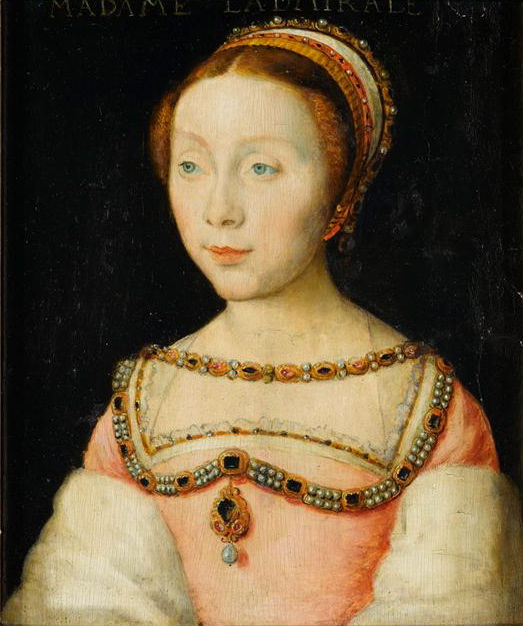
Françoise de Longwy

- 1532-1534 : Hélène Gouffier de Boisy, dame de Traves
- 1532-1537 : Isabeau de Picart d'Estelan, dame du Ris
- 1532-1542 : Marie Gaudin
- 1532-1543 : Marie d'Acigné, dame de Canaples
- 1532-1543 : Jacqueline de la Queille, dame d'Aubigny
- 1532-1543 : Anne Lascaris
- 1532-1543 : Françoise de Longwy
- 1532-1543 : Diane de Poitiers
- 1532-1543 : Isabelle de Savoie-Villars, comtesse du Bouchage
- 1532-1543, 1546-1547 : Louise de Polignac, dame du Vigean
- 1533-1543 : Madeleine de Mailly, dame de Roye
- 1534-1537 : Anne de La Fontaine, dame de la Mairie (fille d'honneur 1532 - 1534)
- 1534-1542 and 1545-1547 : Marie de Langeac, baronne de Lestrange
- 1537-1543 : Claude de Rohan-Gié (fille d'honneur de 1530 à 1537)
- 1537-1543 : Marguerite de Savoie-Villars, comtesse de Brienne (fille d'honneur 1533 - 1537)
- ?-1538 : Jeanne d'Angoulême
- 1538-1539 : Françoise de Brézé (fille d'honneur 1534 - 1538)
- 1538-1543 : Jacqueline de Longwy (fille d'honneur 1533 - 1538)
- 1538-1543 : Jacqueline de Rohan-Gyé (fille d'honneur 1531 - 1536)
- 1539-1543 : Charlotte de Brie, dame de Lauzun
- 1539-1543 : Guillemette de Sarrebruck
- 1540-? : Françoise Girard de Chevenon, dame de la Trollière
- 1543-? : Jacqueline de Romezolles, dame de Castillon
- ?-1543 : Madeleine de Savoie
- 1546-1547 : Guyonne de Rieux (fille d'honneur 1533-1543)
- Anne de Pisseleu d'Heilly

=== Dame (-d'honneur) to Catherine de' Medici 1547–1589 ===
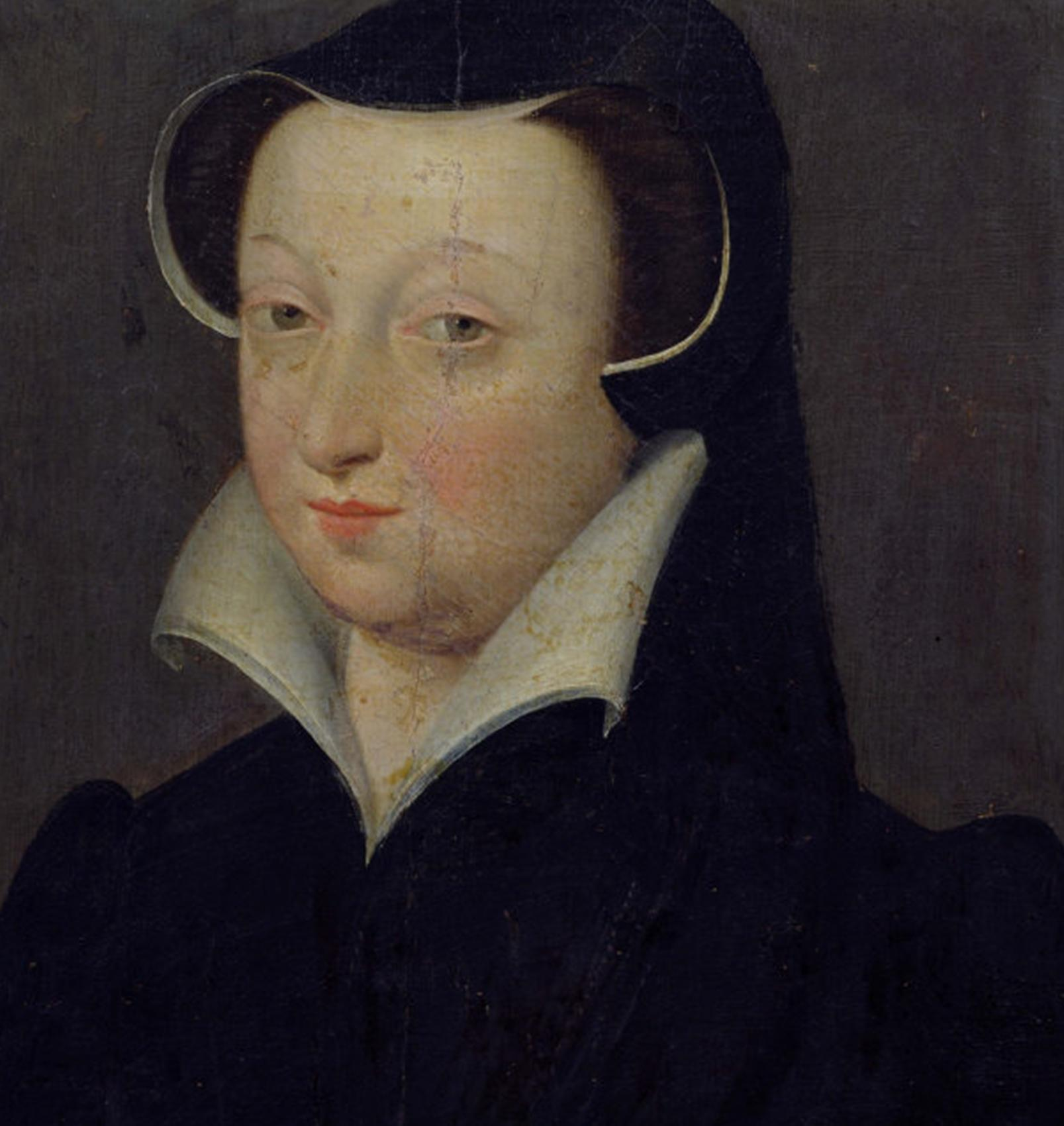
Jacqueline de Rohan

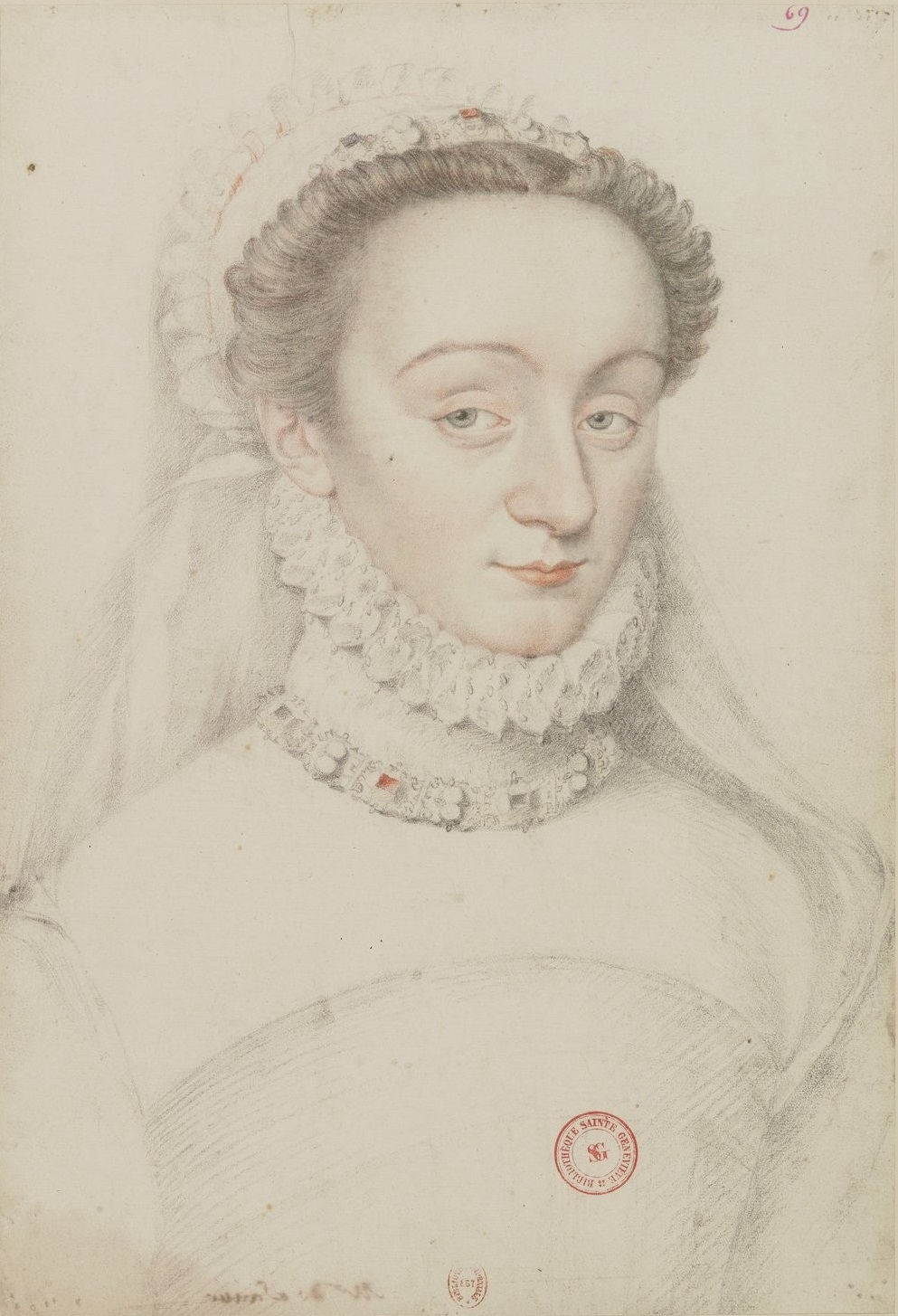
Charlotte de Beaune Semblancay

- 1544-1547, 1560-1570 : Marie-Catherine Pierrevive
- 1548-1560 : Anne de Clermont, dame de Saint-Aignan
- ?-1548 : Claude d'Humières
- 1549-? : Marguerite d'Albon, dame d'Apchon
- 1549-? : Jacqueline de l'Hospital, dame d'Aisnay
- 1549-1560 : Antoinette de Cerisay
- ?-1549 : Françoise de Pompadour, dame de Lustrac
- 1551-1574 : Marie de Bony, dame d'Ausances
- ?-1552 : Madeleine Buonaiuti
- 1552-? : Louise de Clermont
- 1552-? : Hélène de Bissipat, dame de Jamets
- 1552-1555, 1573-1585 : Éléonore Stuart d'Albany, comtesse de Choisy
- 1552-1560 : Louise de Brézé
- 1552-1560, 1568-1574 et 1576-? : Anne d'Este
- 1552-1560, 1573-? : Charlotte de Vienne, dame de Curton
- 1554-1560 : Antoinette de Bourbon
- 1554-1560 : Renée du Quesnay, dame de Moncy
- 1554-1560, 1567-1571 et 1573-1575 : Jeanne de Dampierre
- ?-1554 : Claude de Saint-Seigne, dame de Dampierre
- 1557-1560, 1560-1571 et 1576-1581 : Diane de Valois
- ?-1560 : Marguerite de Lustrac, maréchale de Saint-André
- ?-1560 : Diane de Poitiers
- ?-1560 : Guillemette de Sarrebruck
- ?-1560, 1564-1568 : Hillaire de Marconnay, dame de la Berlandière
- 1560-1564 : Françoise de Longwy
- 1560-1566 : Claude Gouffier, comtesse de Charny
- 1560-1567 : Clarice Strozzi, comtesse de Tende (fille d'honneur 1554 - 1560)
- 1560-1570 : Françoise de Brézé (Première dame d'honneur 1547 - 1559)
- 1560-1571, 1576-1581 : Françoise Robertet, dame de Rostaing et de la Bourdaisière
- 1564-? : Françoise de Warty, dame de Pequigny
- 1564-1571 : Anne de Montpensier, duchesse de Nevers
- 1564-1571 : Louise de Montberon, dame de Sansac
- 1564-1571, 1576-? : Diane de Clermont, dame de Montlaur
- 1564-1574 : Marie Morin (spouse of Michel de l'Hospital)
- 1564-1576, 1581-? : Louise d'Avaugour, baronne de Clermont-Lodève
- 1564-1583 : Louise d'Halluin, dame de Cipierre
- 1565-1571 : Henriette de Nevers (1542-1601)
- 1566-1569, 1573-1574 : Françoise d'Orléans (1549-1601)
- 1567-? : Claude Catherine de Clermont
- 1567-? : Gabrielle de Rochechouart, dame de Lansac
- 1567-1571 : Antoinette de La Marck, maréchale de Damville puis duchesse de Montmorency (fille d'honneur 1560)
- 1567-1571, 1573-1574 et 1576-1577 : Charlotte Picart d'Esquetot, maréchale de Brissac
- 1567-1571, 1576-? : Marguerite de Conan, dame d'Acerac
- 1567-1574, 1583 : Madeleine de Luxembourg, dame de Royan puis de La Chapelle aux Ursins (fille d'honneur 1560 - 1564)
- 1567-1580 : Jeanne d'Halluin (fille d'honneur 1547 - 1557)
- 1568-1569 : Laudamine de Médicis, maréchale de Strozzi
- 1568-1569, 1573-1578 : Antoinette de La Tour-Landry, duchesse de Rouannois
- 1569-?, 1573-1574 et 1578-? : Françoise de la Baume, maréchale de Tavannes
- 1569-1571 : Catherine de Clèves
- 1569-1574, 1577-1581 : Charlotte de Sauve
- ?-1570 : Madeleine de Savoie
- 1571-1578 : Hélène Bon, dame de la Tour
- 1572-? : Anne Cabrianne, dame de Lignerolles
- 1573-? : Claude Gontault, dame de Saint-Sulpice
- 1573-? : Marie de L'Aubépine, dame de Pinart
- 1573-? : Claude de la Tour, dame de Tournon
- 1573-?, 1583-? : Claude Robertet, dame des Arpentis
- 1573-1574, 1585-? : Marie de La Chastre, dame de l'Aubépine
- 1573-1576 : Françoise de Ramefort, dame de Boisbenest
- 1573-1576, 1585-? : Louise Jay, vicomtesse de la Guerche
- 1573-1589 : Madeleine de L'Aubépine
- 1574-? : Marie Porret, dame de la Guesle
- 1574-1577 : Anne de Pisseleu, baronne de Lucé
- 1574-1578 : Nicole le Roy sénéchale d'Agenois puis maréchale de Cossé
- 1576-? : Jeanne de Gontaut
- 1576-? : Lucrèce Cavalcanti, générale d'Elbenne
- 1576-? : Renée de Coesmes, baronne d'Avaugour
- 1576-? : Françoise d'O, dame de Maintenon
- 1576-? : Gabrielle de Sado, vicomtesse de Tours
- 1576-? : Anne de Thou, dame de Cheverny
- 1576-1578 : Françoise de Rye, comtesse de Charny
- 1576-1578, 1583-? : Françoise de Maridor, dame de Lucé
- 1576-1583 : Claude de Pierres, dame de Marigny
- 1577-? : Renée de Cossé-Brissac, dame de Mery
- 1577-? : Jeanne de Gaignon, dame de Chadieu
- 1578-? : Charlotte de Chabannes, dame de Moÿ
- 1578-1584 : Claude de L'Aubépine, dame de Chemerault
- 1578-? : Claude d'Ognies, dame d'Applaincourt
- 1578-? : Marguerite de Rostaing, dame de Cousan
- 1578-? : Anne de Warty, dame de Sénarpont
- ?-1578, 1581-? : Madeleine d'Ognies, dame de Castelpers
- 1579-? : Anne de Carnazet, dame de Crèvecœur
- 1579-? : Jeanne des Essars, dame de Cigogne
- 1579-? : Madeleine le Roy, dame de Rouville
- 1579-? : Jeanne de Moy, comtesse de Chateauvillain
- 1581-? : Marie II de Saint-Pol
- 1581-? : Renée d'Anjou-Mézière
- 1581-? : Madeleine de Cossé-Brissac, comtesse puis marquise de Choisy
- 1581-? : Renée du Prat, marquise de Curton
- 1581-? : Laure de Saint Martin, dame de Biragues
- 1581-1582 : Henriette de Savoie-Villars
- 1582-1586 : Filippa Duci
- 1583-? : Jeanne de Coesme
- 1583-? : Diane de La Marck
- 1583-? : Marguerite de La Chastre, dame de Saint-Nectaire
- 1583-? : Julienne d'Arquenay, dame de Rambouillet
- 1583-? : Hélène de Clermont, dame de Gramont
- 1583-? : Charlotte des Ursins, marquise de Mosny
- 1584-? : Charlotte de Moÿ, dame d'Esneval
- 1585-? : Marie de Moy, dame de la Gruthuse
- 1585-? : Anne de Barbanson, dame de Nantouillet
- 1585-? : Anne Chabot, dame de Piennes
- 1585-? : Anne Hurault, dame de Bury
- 1585-? : Catherine de Marcilly, dame de Ragny
- 1585-? : Anne Robertet, dame de la Chastre
- 1585-? : Charlotte de Villequier, dame d'O
- Jacqueline de Rohan, Marquise de Rothelin

=== Dame (-d'honneur) to Mary Stuart 1559–1560 ===
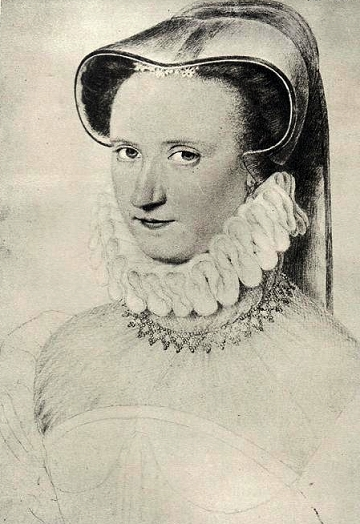
Francoise Babou de La Bourdaisiere

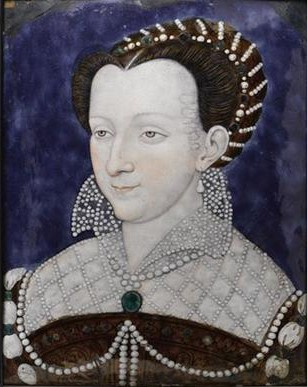
Anne d'Este

Mary Stuart is recorded to have a household of 290 people, 44 of whom were women, 27 of whom had the status of ladies-in-waiting; all French but two and appointed because they were her relatives or had succeeded from the household of her predecessor. Mary Stuart left France for Scotland in 1561, after which almost all of her ladies-in-waiting chose to remain in France.

- 1560 : Jacqueline de Longwy
- 1560 : Marie-Catherine Pierrevive
- 1560 : Françoise Babou de la Bourdaisière
- 1560 : Madeleine de Savoie
- 1560 : Antoinette de Bourbon
- 1560 : Louise de Brézé
- 1560 : Anne d'Este
- 1560 : Louise de Rieux, marquise d'Elbeuf
- 1560 : Diane de Valois
- 1560 : Françoise de Brézé
- 1560 : Marguerite de Lustrac, maréchale de Saint-André
- 1560 : Marie de Beaucaire, dame de Martigues
- 1560 : Marguerite Bertrand, marquise de Trans
- 1560 : Antoinette de Cerisay
- 1560 : Marie de Gaignon, dame de Boisy
- 1560 : Anne Hurault, dame de Carnavalet
- 1560 : Antoinette de La Marck, maréchale de Damville puis duchesse de Montmorency
- 1560 : Anne Le Maye, dame de Dannemarie
- 1560 : Hillaire de Marconnay, dame de la Berlandière
- 1560 : Françoise Robertet, dame de la Bourdaisière
- 1560 : Louise d'Halluin, dame de Cipierre
- 1560 : Marie Babou
- 1560 : Francoise Babou
- 1560 : Anne Chabot, demoiselle de Brion
- 1560 : Suzanne Constant, demoiselle de Fonterpuys
- 1560 : Hippolyte d'Ecosse, demoiselle de Richebourg
- 1560 : Anne Cabrianne, demoiselle de la Guyonniere

=== Dame (-d'honneur) to Elisabeth of Austria, Queen of France 1570–1575 ===
- 1572-? : Renée de Cossé, dame de Meru
- 1572-? : Françoise de Rye, comtesse de Charny
- 1572-1573 : Antoinette de La Tour-Landry, duchesse de Rouannois
- 1572-1573 : Jacqueline d'Averton, comtesse de Mauleuvrier
- 1573-? : Françoise d'Orléans (1549-1601)
- 1573-? : Gabrielle de Rochechouart, dame de Lansac
- 1573-? : Jeanne de Montmorency, duchesse de Thouars
- ?-1573 : Marie de Montmorency, comtesse de Candalle
- 1574-? : Renée de Savoie-Tende
- ?-1574 : Anne de Daillon, dame de Ruffec
- ?-1574 : Marguerite de Bourbon-Vendôme
- ?-1574 : Louise de Brézé
- Renée d'Anjou-Mézière
- Antoinette de Bourbon
- Françoise de Bourbon-Vendôme
- Marie II de Saint-Pol
- Claude Catherine de Clermont
- Henriette de Nevers (1542-1601)
- Catherine de Clèves
- Marie de Clèves (1553-1574)
- Diane de Valois
- Anne d'Este
- Catherine de Lorraine (1552-1596)
- Alphonsine Strozzi
- Antoinette de La Marck, maréchale de Damville puis duchesse de Montmorency
- Catherine de Silly, dame de Brion
- Diane de Clermont, dame de Monlaur
- Marie de Beaucaire, dame de Martigues
- Hélène Bon, dame de la Tour
- Françoise du Bouchet, maréchale de Cossé
- Anne Chabot, dame de Piennes
- Jeanne Chasteigner, dame de Villeparisis
- Renée de Coesme, dame d'Avangour
- Marguerite de Conan, dame d'Acerac
- Françoise de Cosdun, dame de la Barbelinière
- Charlotte d'Esquetot, maréchale de Brissac
- Louise de Montberon, dame de Sansac
- Françoise Robertet, dame de la Bourdaisière
- Jeanne de Vivonne, dame de Dampierre

=== Dame (-d'honneur) to Louise of Lorraine 1575–1601 ===
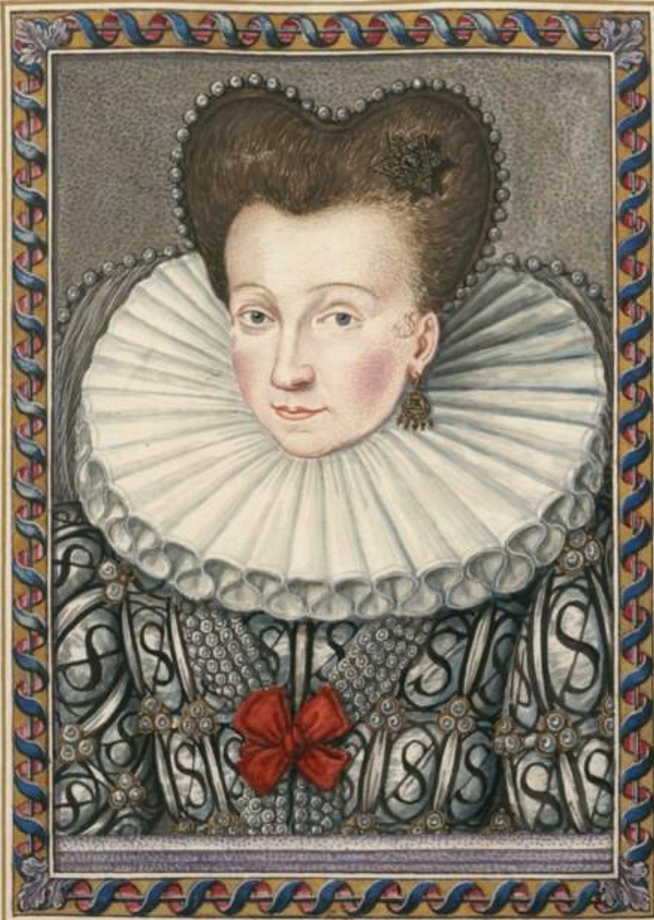
Francoise d'Orléans, Princess of Condé by an known artist

- 1575-1590 : Françoise Babou de la Bourdaisière
- 1577-? : Catherine de Lorraine, duchesse de Mercœur
- 1577-? : Marie de Luxembourg (1562-1623)
- 1577-? : Marguerite de Conan, dame d'Acerac
- 1577-? : Jeanne de Cossé-Brissac, dame de Saint-Luc
- ?-1577 : Diane de Cossé, comtesse de Mansfeld
- ?-1577 : Charlotte Picart d'Esquetot, dame de Brissac
- 1578-? : Hélène Bon, dame de la Tour
- 1578-? : Françoise de la Baume, dame de Carnevenoy
- 1579-? : Isabeau de Sorbières, dame de Saint-Germain
- 1579-? : Renée d'Averton, dame de Sérillac
- 1579-? : Anne de Daillon, dame d'Estissac
- 1579-? : Jacqueline de la Chapelle, dame de Malicorne
- 1579-? : Gilberte de Marconnay, dame de Montmorin
- 1579-? : Françoise de Rochechouart, dame de Richelieu
- 1579-? : Catherine Tournabon, dame d'Elbenne
- 1580-? : Sylvie de la Rochefoucault, dame de Champdenier
- 1580-? : Antoinette de La Tour, comtesse de Chasteauvillain
- 1580-? : Jacqueline d'Aumont, dame d'Allègre
- 1580-? : Madeleine de Bouillé, vicomtesse de Rochechouart
- 1580-? : Suzanne de la Porte, dame de Richelieu
- 1580-1581 : Renée d'Anjou-Mézière
- 1580-1587 : Françoise de Laval, dame de Lenoncourt
- 1582-? : Marie Gentian, dame de Miron
- 1582-? : Jeanne de Lenoncourt, dame de Boisdauphin
- 1582-? : Marguerite de Lorraine, duchesse de Joyeuse
- 1582-? : Marie d'Elbeuf, duchesse d'Aumale
- 1582-? : Marie de Beaucaire, dame de Martigues
- 1582-? : Antoinette de La Marck, maréchale de Damville puis duchesse de Montmorency
- 1582-? : Anne de Rostaing, dame de Sourdis
- 1582-? : Héliette de Vivonne, dame de Fontaines-Chalandray
- 1582-? : Henriette de Savoie-Villars
- 1582-1583 : Jeanne de Coesme
- 1582-1586 : Diane de Lorraine, duchesse de Piney
- 1583-? : Diane de Valois
- 1583-? : Catherine de Lorraine (1552-1596)
- 1584-? : Antoinette de Pons
- 1584-? : Catherine du Val, dame de Rothelin
- 1584-? : Catherine de la Marche, dame de Champvallon
- 1584-? : Claude de L'Aubépine, dame de Chemerault
- 1585-? : Claude Catherine de Clermont
- 1585-? : Charlotte de Sauve
- 1585-? : Marguerite de Dinteville
- 1585-? : Charlotte de Beaucaire, dame de Viverots
- 1585-? : Anne de Batarnay, dame de la Vallette
- 1585-? : Marie d'Allègre, dame de la Fayette
- 1585-? : Gabrielle de Crevant, dame de Montigny
- 1585-? : Françoise du Plessis, dame du Cambout
- 1585-? : Anne Hurault, marquise de Nesle
- 1585-1586 : Catherine de Nogaret, dame du Bouchage
- ?-1585 : Anne de Thou, dame de Cheverny
- ?-1586 : Madeleine de Savoie
- 1587-? : Christine d'Aguerres, comtesse de Saulx
- 1587-? : Claude de Pierres, dame de Marigny
- 1588-? : Marguerite Claude de Gondi, marquise de Maignelers
- 1588-? : Isabelle de la Rochefoucault, dame de Randan
- 1589-? : Jacquette de Montberon, dame de Bourdeilles
- Anne d'Este
- Catherine de Clèves
- Henriette de Nevers (1542-1601)
- Marie II de Saint-Pol
- Françoise d'Orléans (1549-1601)
- Jeanne de Laval (1549-1586)
- Gabrielle de Rochechouart, dame de Lansac
- Catherine de Marcilly, dame de Ragny
- Marie d'Arconna
- Anne Chabot, dame de Piennes
- Jeanne Chastaigner, dame de Schomberg
- Antoinette du Chastellet, dame de la Bastide
- Hélène d'Illiers, dame d'O
- Françoise de La Marck, dame de Villequier
- Françoise Robertet, dame de la Bourdaisière
- Françoise de Rye, comtesse de Charny
- Marguerite de Saluces, maréchale de Bellegarde
- Catherine de Silly, dame de Brion
- Diane de Vivonne, dame de Larchant

=== Dame (-d'honneur) to Marie de' Medici 1600–1632 ===
- Louise Marguerite of Lorraine
- Charlotte des Essarts
- Charlotte-Marguerite de Montmorency

=== Dame (-d'honneur) to Anne of Austria 1615–1666 ===
- Louise Marguerite of Lorraine

=== Dame du Palais to Maria Theresa of Spain 1660–1683 ===
The Dame (-d'honneur) were renamed Dame du Palais in January 1674.

- Princess Louise of Savoy, 1664-73
- Madame la Duchesse d’Uzais
- Louise Antoinette Thérèse de la Châtre, Duchesse la Marêchale de Humiéres
- Françoise-Athénaïs de Rochechouart, Marquise de Montespan
- Marguerite-Louise-Suzanne de Béthune Sully, Madame la Comtesse de Guiche, prêsentement Duchesse du Lude
- Elizabeth, Countess de Gramont in 1667-
- Anne de Rohan-Chabot, Madame la Princesse de Soubize in 1674-
- Marie-Françoise de Villars-Brancas, Madame la Princesse de Harcourt in 1667-1683
- Jeanne Marie Thérèse Colbert, Madame la Duchesse de Chevreuse
- Marie d'Albret, Madame d’Albret
- Marie Françoise de Bournonville, Madame la Duchesse de Noailles
- Madame la Marquise de la Valiére
- Marie Louise Claire D'Albert de Luynes, Madame la Princesse de Tingry, in 1679-1683
- Jeanne Angélique Rocque (de Varengeville), duchess de Villars
- Henriette Louise Colbert, Madame la Duchesse de Beauvilliers
- Isabelle de Ludres
- Françoise-Madeleine-Claude de Warignies, comtesse de Saint-Géran
- Louise Gabrielle de La Baume Le Blanc, comtesse de Plessis-Praslin puis duchesse de Choiseul
- Louise Boyer, Duchesse de Noailles in 1674-

=== Dame du Palais to Marie Leszczyńska 1725–1768 ===
Many of the Dame du Palais of Marie Leszczyńska were transferred to the court of Marie Antoinette in 1770 with the title Dame pour accompanger, and became Dame du Palais again when Marie Antoinette became queen in 1774.

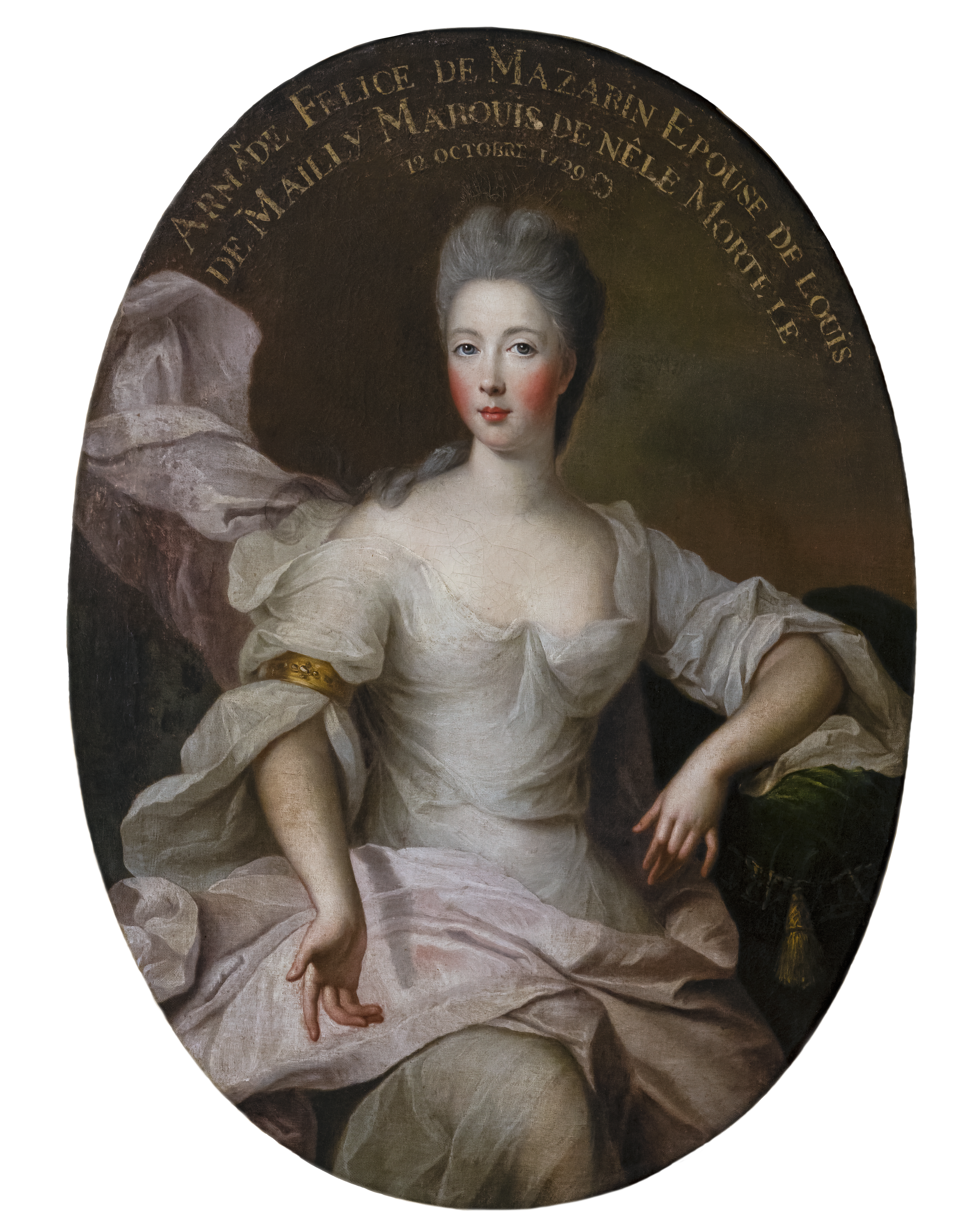
Gobert - Portrait de Armande Felice de Mazarin

- 1725–1740: Marie-Adélaïde de Gramont, duchesse de Biron, dite duchesse de Gontaut
- 1725–1728: Henriette-Julie de Durfort, comtesse d’Egmont
- 1725–1740: Marie-Françoise de Rochechouart-Mortemart, princesse de Chalais
- 1725–1737: Julie-Christine-Régine Gorge d’Antraigues, duchesse de Béthune-Charost
- 1725–1746: Garcie-Joséphine-Pétronille de Salcedo, comtesse de Mérode
- 1725–1741: Edmée-Charlotte de Brenne, marquise de Matignon
- 1725–1729: Armande Félice de La Porte Mazarin, marquise de Nesle
- 1725–1726: Agnès Berthelot de Pléneuf, marquise de Prie
- 1725–1741: Marie-Marguerite de Tourzel d’Alègre, marquise de Rupelmonde
- 1725–1727: Jeanne-Angélique Rocque de Varengeville, duchesse de Villars
- 1725–1757: Françoise-Gillette de Montmorency-Luxembourg, duchesse d' Antin
- 1725–1729: Marie Isabelle de Rohan, Duchess of Tallard
- 1726–1734: Marie-Josèphe de Boufflers, duchesse d'Alincourt
- 1727–1742: Amable-Gabrielle de Villars
- 1728–1739: Henriette Fitzjames, marquise de Renel
- 1729–1757: Catherine-Éléonore-Eugénie de Béthisy de Mézières, princesse de Montauban
- 1729–1742: Louise Julie de Mailly
- 1734–1749: Madeleine Angélique Neufville de Villeroy, duchesse de Boufflers, puis de Luxembourg
- 1737–1745: Marthe-Élisabeth de La Rochefoucauld de Roye, duchesse d'Ancis
- 1737–1762: Laure Fitz-James, marquise de Bouzols
- 1739–1768: Anne-Madeleine-Françoise d'Auxy de Monceaux Fleury
- 1740–1768: Marie-Élisabeth Chamillart, marquise de Talleyrand
- 1741–1751: Marie-Chrétienne-Christine de Gramont, comtesse de Rupelmonde
- 1741–1762: Victoire-Louise-Joseph Goyon de Matignon, duchesse de Fitz-James
- 1742–1744: Marie Anne de Mailly
- 1742–1766: Hortense Félicité de Mailly
- 1745–1748: Hélène-Françoise-Angélique Phélypeaux de Pontchartrain, duchesse de Nivernais
- 1746–1753: Marie-Françoise-Casimire de Froulay de Tessé, comtesse de Saulx
- 1747–1768: Marie-Anne-Philippine-Thérèse de Montmorency-Logny, duchesse de Boufflers
- 1748–1768: Louise-Félicité de Bréhan de Plélo, duchesse d'Agénois puis d'Aiguillon
- 1749–1752: Alise-Tranquille de Clermont-Tonnerre, marquise de Montoison (dame du palais surnuméraire)
- 1753–1759: Anne-Marguerite-Gabrielle de Beauvau-Craon, duchesse de Mirepoix
- 1751–1768: Marie-Louise-Sophie de Faoucq de Garnetot, comtesse de Gramont
- 1756–1764: Madame de Pompadour
- 1757–1768: Marie-Anne-Julie Le Tonnelier de Breteuil, comtesse de Clermont-Tonnerre
- 1757–1768: Marie-Émilie FitzJames, marquise d'Escars
- 1759–1768: Marie-Éléonore de Lévis de Châteaumorand, comtesse de Tavannes
- 1762–1768: Laure-Auguste de Fitz-James, Princess de Chimay
- 1762–1766: Marie-Hélène-Charlotte Caillebot de La Salle, vicomtesse de Beaune
- 1763–1768: Marie-Madeleine de Rosset de Fleury, duchesse de Beauvilliers
- 1764–1768: Gabrielle Pauline d'Adhémar
- 1766–1768: Marie-Paule-Angélique d'Albert de Luynes, duchesse de Chaulnes
- 1767–1768: Louise-Charlotte de Duras (dame du palais surnuméraire)

=== Dame du Palais to Marie Antoinette 1774–1792 ===
Many of the Dame du Palais of Marie Antoinette were transferred to her from the former court of Marie Leszczyńska in 1770. They had the title Dame pour accompanger when Marie Antoinette was Dauphine, and became Dame du Palais again when Marie Antoinette became queen in 1774.

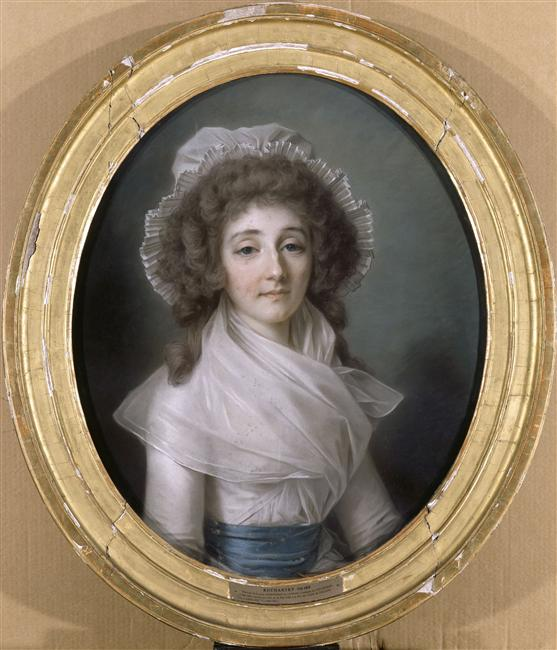
Pastel of Louise d'Esparbès de Lussan by Alexandre Kucharski

- 1774–1791: Louise-Charlotte de Duras
- 1774–1775: Laure-Auguste de Fitz-James, Princess de Chimay
- 1774-1789: Guyonne-Élisabeth-Josèphe de Montmorency-Laval, Duchesse de Luynes
- 1774–1788: Guyonne-Marguerite-Philippine-Élisabeth de Durfort, Vicomtesse de Choiseul-Praslin
- 1774–1781: Louise-Adélaïde-Victoire de Durfort de Civrac, Marquise de Clermont-Tonnerre
- 1774–1789: Madeleine-Suzanne-Adélaïde Voyer d'Argenson de Paulmy, Duchesse de Luxembourg
- 1774–1785: Marie-Éléonore de Lévis de Châteaumorand, Comtesse de Tavannes
- 1774–1780: Marie-Elisabeth Chamillart, Marquise de Talleyrand
- 1774–1788: Marie-Louise-Sophie de Faoucq de Garnetot, Comtesse de Gramont
- 1774–1786: Marie-Madeleine de Rosset de Fleury, Duchesse de Beauvilliers
- 1774–1781: Marie-Paule-Angélique d'Albert de Luynes, Duchesse de Chaulnes
- 1775–1792: Colette-Marie-Paule-Hortense-Bernardine de Beauvilliers de Saint-Aignan, Marquise de La Roche-Aymon
- 1778–1789: Gabrielle Pauline d'Adhémar
- 1778–1789: Adélaïde-Félicité-Étienette de Guinot de Monconseil, Princesse d'Hénin
- 1780–1782: Thérèse-Lucy de Dillon (dame du palais surnuméraire)
- 1780–1789: Alexandrine-Victoire-Éléonore de Damas d'Antigay, Comtesse de Talleyrand
- 1781–1789: Marie-Sylvie-Claudine de Thiard de Bissy, Duchesse de Fitzjames
- 1781–1789: Marie-Thérèse-Josèphe de Castellane, Princesse de Berghes
- 1782–1789: Louise de Polastron
- 1784–1789: Marie-Louise de Bonnières de Souastre de Guisnes, Comtesse de Juigné
- 1785–1789: Gabrielle-Charlotte-Éléonore de Saulx-Tavannes, Vicomtesse de Castellane
- 1786–1792: Louise-Emmanuelle de Châtillon, Princesse de Tarente
- 1787–1789: Henriette-Lucy, Marquise de La Tour du Pin Gouvernet (dame du palais surnuméraire)
- 1788–1789: Gabrielle-Charlotte-Eugénie de Boisgelin, Comtesse de Gramont d'Aster
- 1788–1792: Madeleine-Angélique-Charlotte de Bréhan, Duchesse de Maillé

=== Dame du Palais to Joséphine de Beauharnais 1804–1814 ===
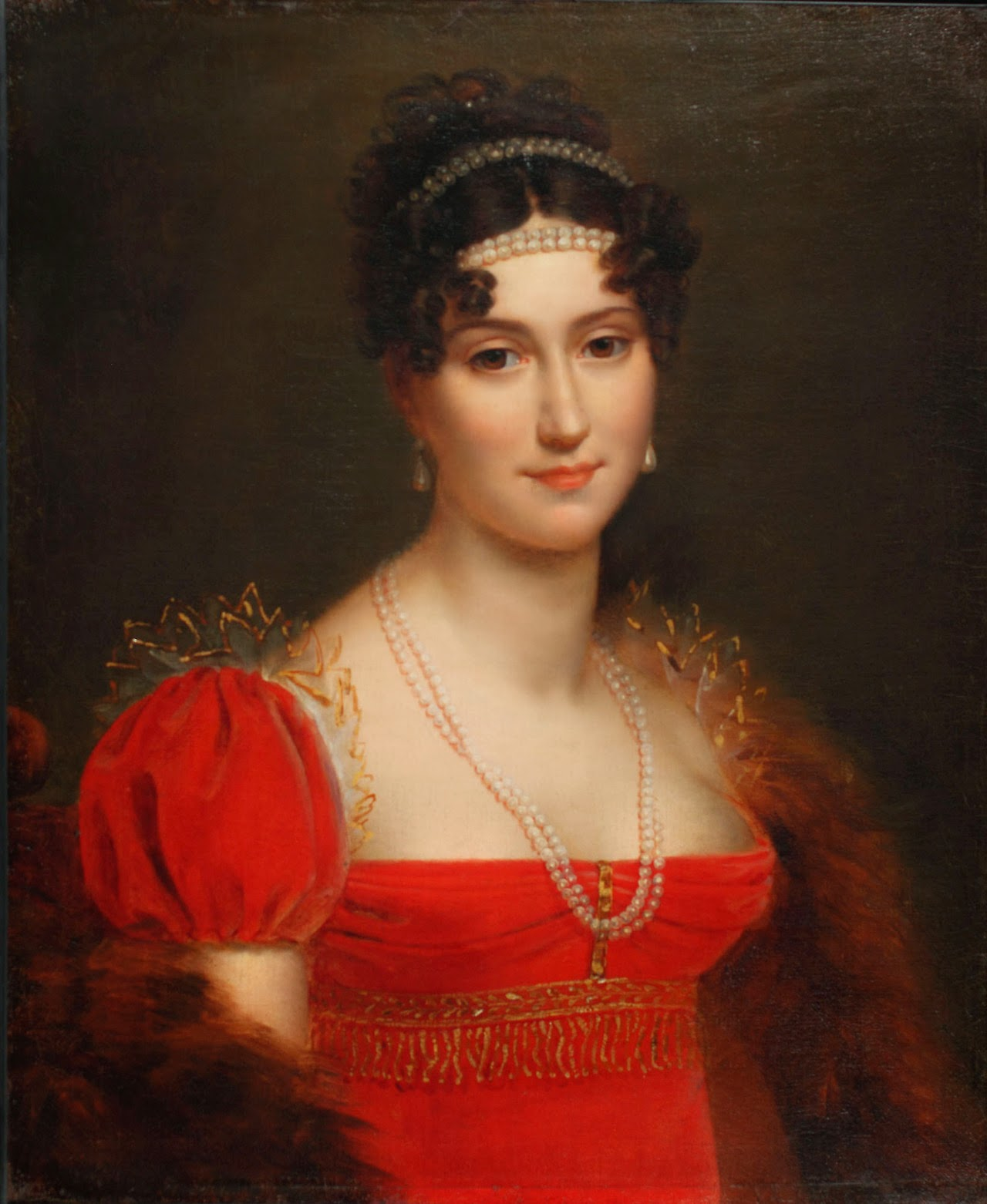
Aglae Ney

- 1804–1804: Élisabeth Le Michaud d'Arçon de Vaudey
- 1804–1809: Jeanne Charlotte du Lucay
- 1804–1809: Madame de Rémusat
- 1804–1809: Elisabeth Baude de Talhouët
- 1804–1809: Madame Lauriston
- 1804–1809: Madame d'Arberg
- 1804–1809: Marie Antoinette Duchâtel
- 1804–1809: Sophie de Segur
- 1804–1809: Madame Séran
- 1804–1809: Madame Colbert
- 1804–1809: Madame Savary
- 1804–1809: Aglaé Louise Auguié Ney
- 1804–1809: Élisabeth de Vaudey

=== Dame du Palais to Marie Louise 1810–1814 ===
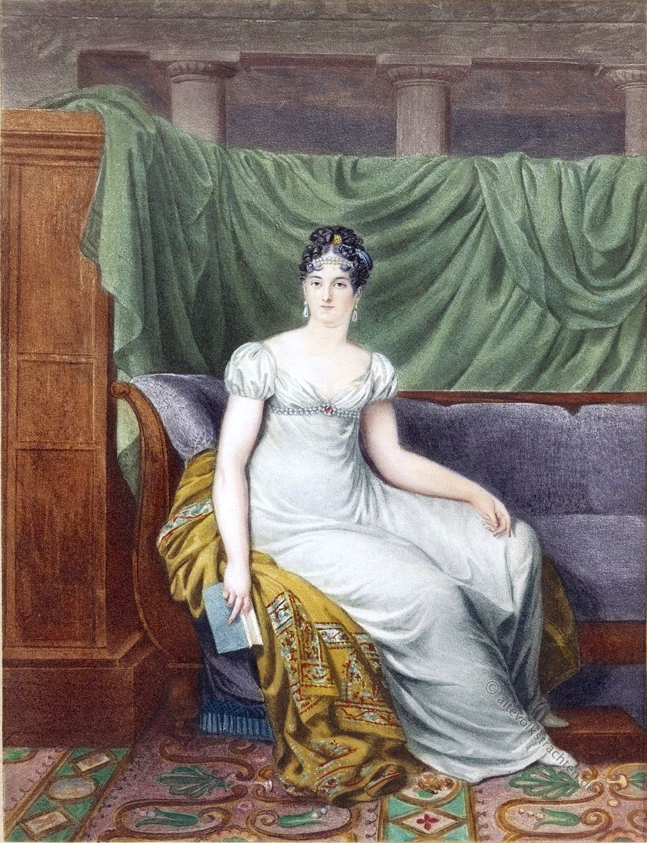
Adélaïde de Saint-Germain, comtesse de Montalivet

- 1810-1813 : Aglaé Auguié
- 1810-1814 : Marie Madeleine Lejéas-Carpentier, duchesse de Bassano
- 1810-1814 : Comtesse de Montmorency
- 1810-1814 : Madame Mortemart
- 1810-1814 : Madame de Bouille
- 1810-1814 : Élisabeth Baude de Talhouët
- 1810-1814 : Madame Lauriston
- 1810-1814 : Marie-Antoinette Duchâtel
- 1810-1814 : Madame Peron
- 1810-1814 : Madame Lascaris
- 1810-1814 : Madame Noailles
- 1810-1814 : Madame Ventimiglia
- 1810-1814 : Madame Gentili
- 1810-1814 : Madame Canisy
- 1810–1814: Anna Pieri Brignole Sale
- 1810-1814 : Adélaïde de Saint-Germain
- 1810-1814 : Dorothée de Courlande

=== Dame du Palais to Maria Amalia of Naples and Sicily 1830–1848 ===
- 1830-1848 : Isabella Charlotte de Rohan-Chabot

=== Dame du Palais to Eugénie de Montijo 1853–1870 ===
- 1853–1870: Adrienne de Villeneuve-Bargemont
- 1853–1870: Anne Eve Mortier de Trévise
- 1853–1870: Claire Emilie MacDonnel
- 1853–1870: Jane Thorne
- 1853–1864: Louise Poitelon du Tarde
- 1853–1870: Nathalie de Ségur
- 18??–18??: Mélanie de Pourtalès
- 1866–1870: Amélie Carette

== See also ==
- Lady of the Bedchamber, English equivalent
- Statsfru, Swedish equivalent
