= Château de Montbron (Charente) =

Remains of a castle in Montbron, France

Coordinates: 45°40′04″N 0°29′50″E

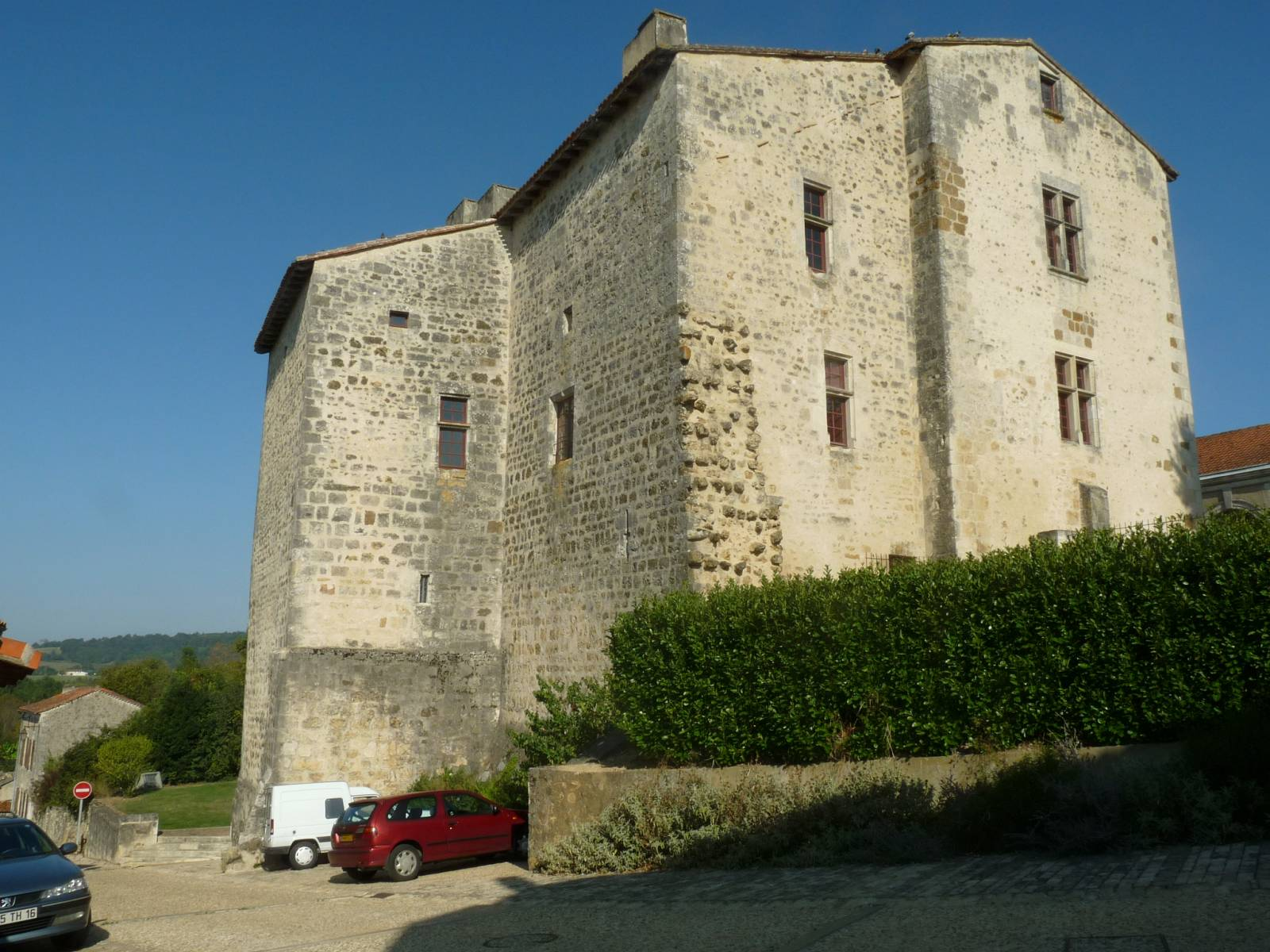
View from south west

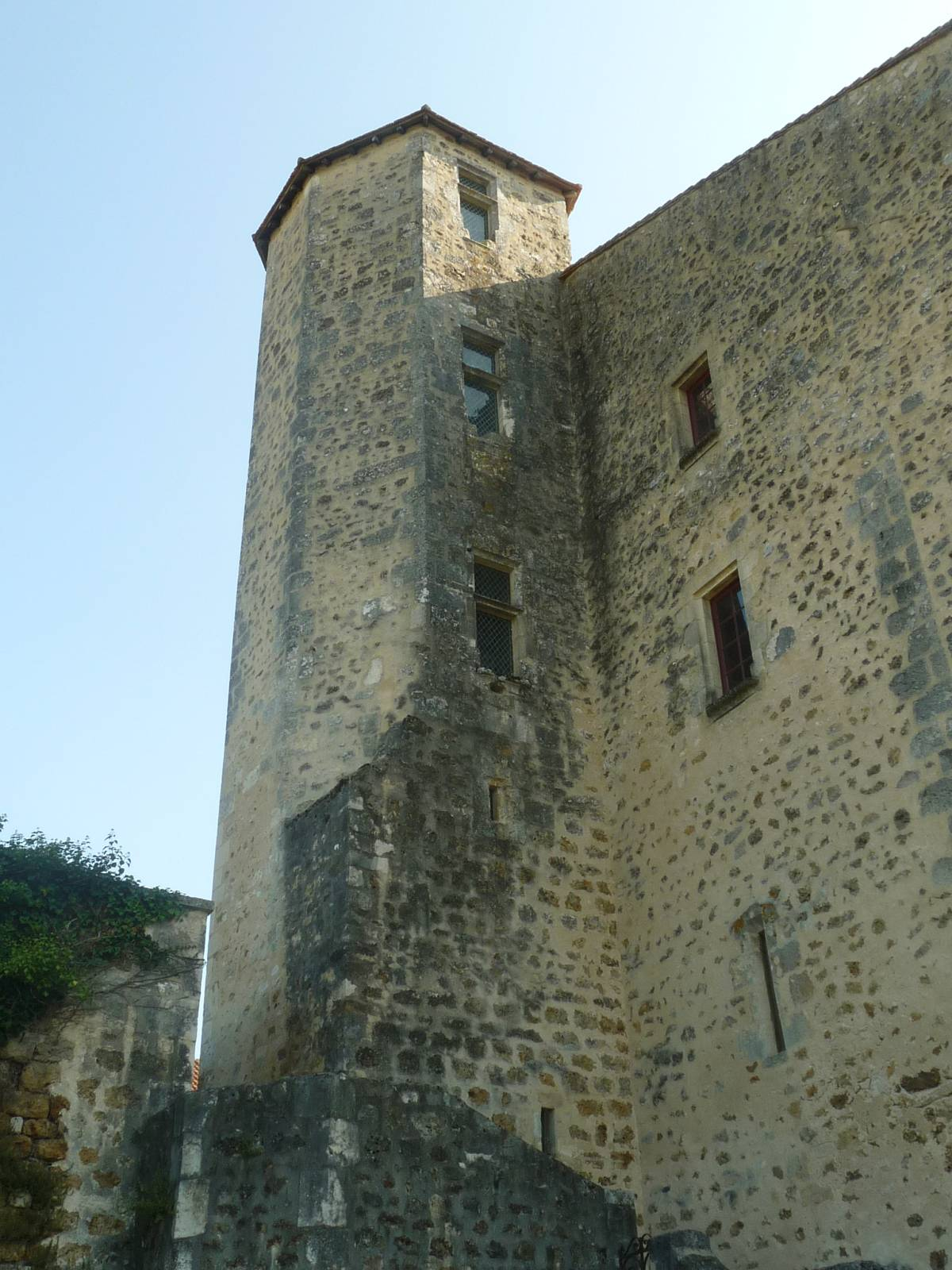
Polygonal tower

The Château de Montbron, known locally as the Vieux Château (old château) is the remains of a castle in the commune of Montbron in the Charente département of France.

== History ==
The ancient castle of Montbron (the name is derived "Mons Berulphi"), is known from before the 12th century.

The castle was mentioned in a diploma of Charles the Bald in 852.

In the 15th century, it was razed, with its simple rectangular keep, as a sign of infamy, by order of King Charles VII. Marguerite de Rohan, Countess of Angoulême (wife of John, Count of Angoulême), rebuilt the castle, of which parts still remain including the Romanesque-style keep.

Jacquette de Montberon, last representative of the elder branch of the Montberon family, married André de Bourdeille in 1558 and brought him the lordship, which then passed to Louise de Savoie (Countess of Angoulême and mother of François I).

In 1624, the heirs of Henri de Luxembourg had to sell the Montbron title to the Loménie family, who kept Montbron as well as the county of Brienne until the end of the 17th century.

In 1699, Étienne Chérade acquired the title. His grandson, Adrien-Alexandre-Étienne Chérade de Montbron, obtained by letters patent in December 1766 the title of Montbron, but he was dispossessed during the French Revolution.

== Architecture ==
All that remains is the polygonal turret. Drawings show a single pitched roof building. The dungeon was pierced with rectangular windows in the 17th century.

The two painted chimneys dating from the 17th century and situated on the first floor were classified as monuments historiguqes by the French Ministry of Culture in 1985.

== See also ==
- List of castles in France
