= Inés de la Torre, 1st Countess of la Torre =

Inés Enríquez y Sandoval or Inés Enríquez Tavera de Saavedra, 1st Countess of la Torre (died after 1618) was a Spanish and later French court official. She served as Première dame d'honneur to the queen of France, Anne of Austria, from 1615 until 1618.

== Appointment ==
Inés de la Torre was a daughter of Juan de Saavedra el Turquillo and Francisca Enríquez de Sandoval, and a cousin to the influential favorite of Philip III of Spain, Francisco Gómez de Sandoval, 1st Duke of Lerma. She was heiress of the house of Saavedra. She married Per Afán de Ribera y Guzmán, señor de la Torre de la Reina.

Inés de la Torre served as lady-in-waiting to the queen, Margaret of Austria, Queen of Spain. As a widow, she was created the first Countess de la Torre by the king.

In 1615, was appointed head of the ladies-in-waiting of Anne of Austria prior to her departure from Spain to her wedding to Louis XIII. In an effort to retain their influence upon Anne in France, king Philip III and the Duke of Lerma appointed people they regarded a loyal to themselves to the offices of the household that was to accompany her to France, and as cousin to the duke of Lerma, Inés de la Torre, was given the highest position and expected to protect the interests of Spain at the French court. She was instructed by the Spanish king to make sure that Anne retained her life rules in France, and she was also to give him regular reports of his daughters doings.

== France ==
When Anne arrived at the French royal court in Paris, a dilemma occurred, as she was given a new household composed of Frenchmen upon her arrival, but did not wish to dismiss her Spanish retinue. A compromise was met where she was allowed to keep both households. This resulted in a situation where several offices at her court was split, and the post of Première dame d'honneur was consequently shared by Inés de la Torre and her French counterpart Laurence de Montmorency, just as the second rank office of Dame d'atour was shared between the Spanish Luisa de Osorio and her French counterpart Antoinette d'Albert de Luynes.

Inés de la Torre had a powerful influence over queen Anne. The double court of queen Anne was not popular, as it caused jealousy and rivalry at court because of the queen's preference of her Spanish retinue, and she was accused of isolating herself with her Spanish ladies-in-waiting and of retaining her Spanish customs, which prevented her from adjusting to France and was regarded to have contributed to the difficulty of developing a relationship to the king, Louis XIII. This situation was not changed by the queen mother regent, however, who remained queen and first lady at court, and preferred the self-imposed isolation of queen Anne.

== Dismissal ==
In 1617, the regency government of Maria de' Medici fell and its leading figures, her favorites Concino Concini and Leonora Dori, was ousted from power by help of Charles d'Albert, duc de Luynes. de Luynes also took upon himself to adjust the organisation of the royal household and replaced all the Spanish ladies-in-waiting of Anne with French ones: the process was completed in Winter of 1618-1619, when all that remained of Anne's Spanish retinue was her Spanish confessor and one chamber woman. It was discovered in connection to this that Inés de la Torre had used her position to embezzle huge sums of money intended for the expenses of the queen's household. It was also known that she had co-operated closely with the Spanish ambassador to France, Hector de Pignatelli y Colonna, duke of Monteleon, giving him regular reports and in fact acting as a spy. She was exiled from France and returned to Spain.

The loss of Inés de la Torre caused her to be replaced as the queen's favorite by Marie de Rohan who (supported by the duke de Luynes) introduced Anne to French fashion and customs and managed to effect an (if temporary) closer relation between the king and queen, but also in time became a much controversial favorite.

Court offices
Preceded by Antoinette de Pons	Première dame d'honneur to the Queen of France; 1615–1618 (With Laurence de Montmorency)	Succeeded by Charlotte de Lannoy
