= René Le Coq de La Saussaye =

René Le Coq de La Saussaye, (died some time after 1613), from Gaillon-sur-Seine (Eure), in France, was appointed agent and lieutenant by Antoinette de Pons, Marquise de Guercheville, for the founding of the mission of Saint Sauveur on Mount Desert Island in the French colony of Acadia.
