= Catherine Éléonore Bénard =

French lady-in-waiting

Marie Catherine Éléonore Bénard (Catherine Éléonore Bernard; 1740 – 23 February 1769) was a French lady-in-waiting and alleged petite maîtresse to King Louis XV in 1768-69.

== Biography ==
She was born in Versailles as the daughter of Pierre Bénard and Barbe Bénard. Her father was an officer of the Royal Guard of the King, an 'officier de la Bouche du Roi'. She married the ferme générale Joseph Starot de Saint-Germain, Baron de Montmeyran (1729–1794) on 11 March 1768, in Nogent-sur-Marne.

She was employed in the household of the king's daughter, Madame Adélaïde, as a dame pour accompagner (lady-in-waiting).

On 23 February 1769, she died in Versailles while giving birth to a daughter, Adélaïde de Saint-Germain, Comtesse de Montalivet (1769–1850). The paternity of the daughter is mainly derived from the fact that Madame Adélaïde became her godmother, which was taken to mean that the king was her father.

The unofficial affair between the king and Catherine Éléonore Bénard is mainly derived from the assumption that Louis XV was the biological father of her daughter, and her marriage is thus assumed to have been arranged by the king, in the same manner as the king normally arranged marriages for his discarded lovers.

However, there is nothing to indicate that the king had anything to do with the marriage of Bénard or the paternity of her daughter. The king did not normally have affairs with unmarried noblewomen, only to married ones; and when he had affairs with unmarried commoners, they were normally married off when they became pregnant and discarded; and none of these two typical scenarios is applicable in the case of Catherine Éléonore Bénard. Bénard gave birth to her daughter eleven months after her wedding, and there is nothing to indicate that the king played any part in arranging her marriage, or that he did so because she was pregnant or had already given birth to his child.

== Bibliography ==
=== References ===
Books, journals, magazines, websites, papers
- Jurewitz-Freischmidt, Sylvia (2004). Galantes Versailles: Die Mätressen am Hofe der Bourbonen [Galantes Versailles: The Mistresses at the Court of the Bourbons] (in German). Gernsbach: Katz Casimir Verlag. ISBN 978-3-9258-2586-6, 3-9258-2586-X; OCLC 56808992 (all editions).
- Vrignault, Henri (1954). Les Enfants de Louis XV : Descendance Illégitime [The Children of Louis XV: Illegitimate Descent]. Paris: Éditions Perrin. OCLC 5825433 (all editions).
