= Gabrielle Pauline d'Adhémar =

Gabrielle Pauline Bouthillier de Chavigny (1735–1822), known as countess d'Adhémar, was a French court official and memoir writer.

She was the granddaughter of Léon Bouthillier, comte de Chavigny, and married Joseph Ignace Cosme Alphonse Roch marquis de Valbelle in 1752, and count Jean-Balthazar d'Adhémar in 1772.

Gabrielle was dame du palais (lady-in-waiting) to Queen Marie Leszczyńska in 1764–1768, and to Queen Marie Antoinette in 1770–1789. She chose to retire to her country estate after the start of the French Revolution in 1789.

In 1836 her memoirs were published as Souvenirs sur Marie-Antoinette, archiduchesse d'Autriche, reine de France, et sur la cour de Versailles, par Madame la Csse d'Adhémar, dame du palais.
