= François de La Rochefoucauld (cardinal) =

French Cardinal

His Eminence François de La Rochefoucauld S.J.
- Bishop of Senlis
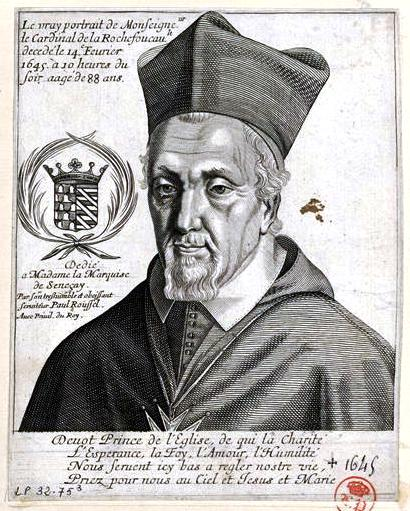
- Diocese: Senlis
- See: Senlis
- Appointed: 15 February 1610
- Term ended: 1622
- Predecessor: Antoine Rose
- Successor: Nicolas Sanguin
- Other post: Cardinal-Priest of San Callisto
- Previous post: Bishop of Clermont (1585-1610)

Orders
- Ordination: 27 September 1585
- Consecration: 6 October 1585 by Gerolamo Ragazzoni
- Created cardinal: 10 December 1607 by Pope Paul V
- Rank: Cardinal-Priest

Personal details
- Born: 8 December 1558
- Died: 14 February 1645 (aged 86) Sainte-Geneviève
- Buried: Saint Jean-Baptiste
- Denomination: Roman Catholic
- Parents: Charles de La Rochefoucald; Fulvie Pico della Mirandola
- Education: Collège de Clermont
- Coat of arms

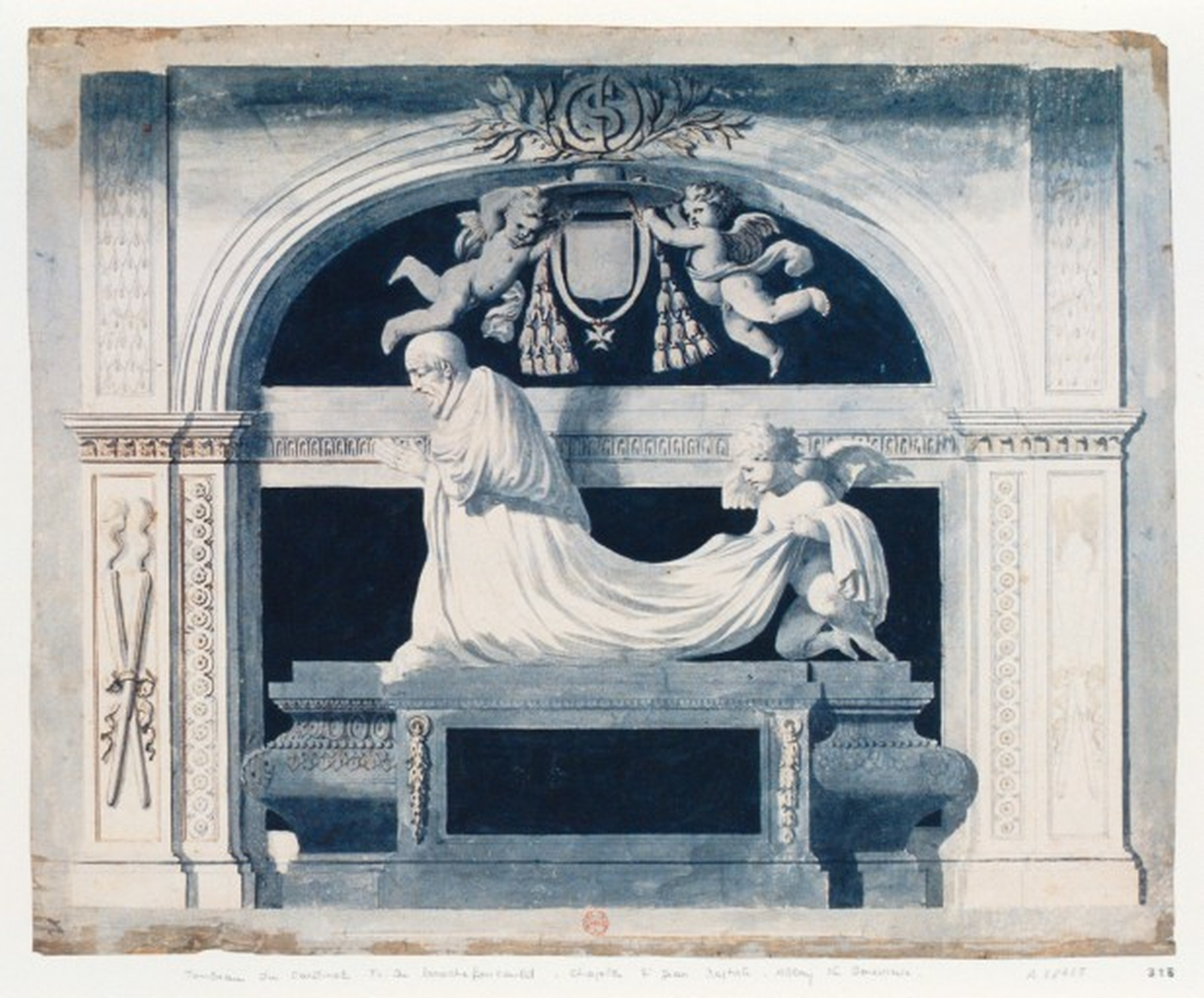
The tomb of de La Rochefoucauld in the Abbey of Sainte-Geneviève in Paris, France.

François de La Rochefoucauld ([fʁɑ̃swa də la ʁɔʃfuka]; 8 December 1558 – 14 February 1645) was a French Cardinal and an "important figure in the French Counter Reformation church".

== Life ==
François de La Rochefoucauld was born 8 December 1558, the second of four sons of Charles de La Rochefoucald, Count of Randan, and Fulvie Pico della Mirandola, and the nephew of Jean de La Rochefoucald, abbot of Marmoutier. When François was three years old, his father was killed at the Siege of Rouen and the family returned to the household of Queen Caterina de Medici of France.

La Rochefoucauld attended the Collége de Marmotier, in Paris and then the Jesuit Collège de Clermont (later renamed Lycée Louis-le-Grand by Louis XIV) in Paris from 1572–1579. In 1569 he was named Vicar general to Cardinal Louis de Lorraine de Guise in the abbey of Tournus.

=== Bishop ===
On 29 July 1585 he was appointed bishop of Clermont, though he needed special Papal dispensation for not meeting all the usual canonical criteria. On 27 September 1585, he received the minor orders was ordained a priest, and consecrated bishop on 6 October 1585.

Coat of Arms of François de La Rochefoucauld, Cardinal of the Holy Catholic Church

=== Cardinalate ===
La Rochefoucauld was elevated to Cardinal in 1607. He was appointed Cardinal-Priest of San Callisto on 1 February 1610 at the age of 51, shortly before moving to the See of Senlis. From September 1618 until 6 February 1632 he was Grand Almoner of France, and during this period was named papal commissioner for the reform of the old religious orders in France on 8 April 1622. He was Grand Chaplain of France and President of the Royal Council from 1622 until his replacement by Cardinal Armand Richelieu in 1624.

He served as abbot of Abbey of Saint Genevieve between 1619 and 1644. In February 1619, Louis XIII appointed de La Rochefoucauld to Sainte-Geneviève in an effort to mitigate the effects of previous canons. The canons had been lax and Cardinal Rochefoucauld selected Charles Faure to follow out his wishes for reform.

In 1633, La Rochefoucauld directed the Abbey of St. Denis join the Congregation of Saint Maur.

By 1635, La Rochefoucauld had tired of the cardinalate, and perhaps of the politics of the Church at that time, and wished to end his life not as a cardinal but as a simple member of the Jesuits. He communicated his desire to resign the cardinalate and enter the Jesuits to the current General of the Society, Father Muzio Vitelleschi. Vitelleschi obtained the consent of Cardinal-Nephew Antonio Barberini, but Pope Urban VIII turned down the request.

La Rochefoucauld remained a cardinal until the end of his life at 86 years of age, on 14 February 1645, at his old abbey at Sainte-Geneviève. Father Vitelleschi took the cardinal's Jesuit vows on his deathbed. La Rochefoucauld was buried in a Jesuit habit in the chapel of Saint Jean-Baptiste, but his heart was deposited in the church of a Jesuit college. In his testament, the cardinal had left not only his books but also his heart to the Collège de Clermont.

== Sources ==
- Review of Cardinal de la Rochefoucauld:Leadership and Reform in the French Church, by Joseph Bergin

Records
Preceded by Pietro Campori	Oldest living Member of the Sacred College; 4 February 1643 - 14 February 1645	Succeeded by Marcello Lante della Rovere
