= Adélaïde de Saint-Germain =

French court official (1769–1850)

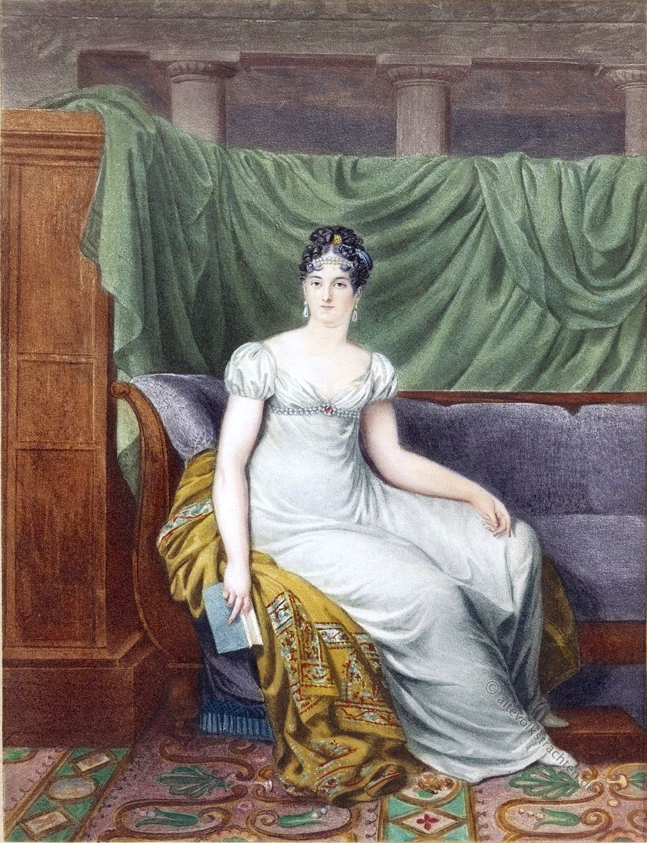
- Born: 1769
- Died: 1850 (aged 80–81)
- Spouse: Jean Pierre Bachasson de Montalivet (m. 1797)
- Father: Louis XV
- Mother: Catherine Éléonore Bénard

Adélaïde de Saint-Germain (1769 – 1850), was a French courtier.

Daughter of Joseph Starot de Saint-Germain and Catherine Éléonore Bénard; her biological father was Louis XV.

She married Jean Pierre Bachasson de Montalivet in 1797.

She served as lady-in-waiting (Dame du Palais) to Empress Joséphine de Beauharnais in 1804–1809, and to Empress Marie Louise in 1810–1814.
