= Claude de Rohan-Gié =

French noblewoman

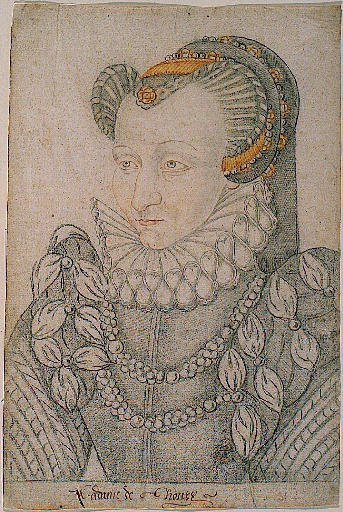
Comtesse de Thoury

Claude de Rohan-Gié (French pronunciation: [klod də ʁɔɑ̃ ʒje]; also Claude de Thoury de Rohan, 1519–1579 CE), was a French lady-in-waiting, best known for being a mistress to Francis I of France.

== Early life ==
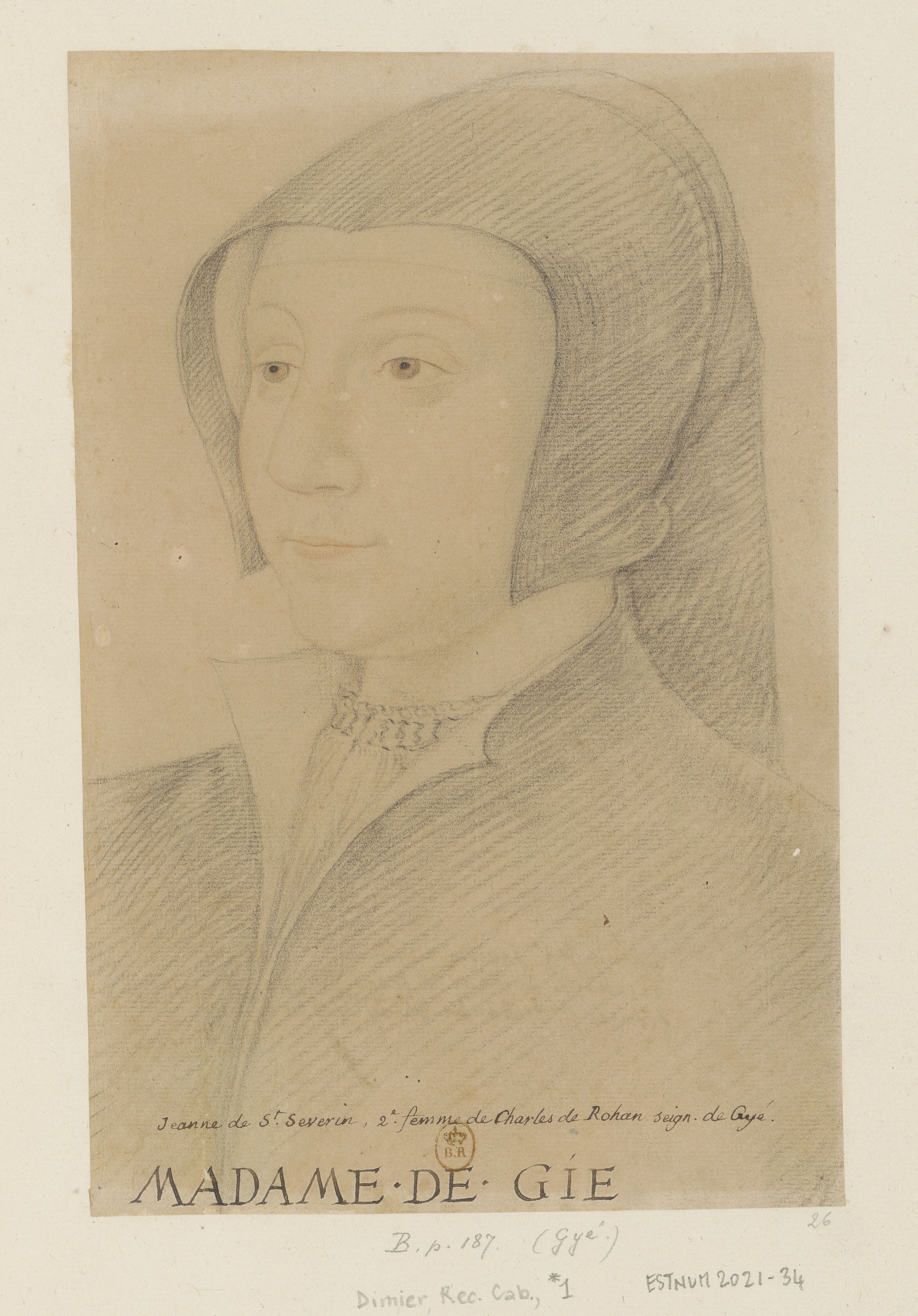
Jeanne de Saint-Severin,mother of Claude by an unknown artist.

Claude was born in 1519 a member of the House of Rohan as the daughter of Charles de Rohan-Gié, vicomte de Fronsac (died in 1529) and his second wife, (Note: Her fathers first marriage was to Charlotte de Armagnac, the sister of his step-mother Marguerite de Armagnac. They were the daughters of Jacques de Armagnac, Duke of Nemours.) the Italian noblewoman Giovanna dei Principi Sanseverino di Bisignano.

Claude's paternal grandparents were Pierre de Rohan, (Note: Claude´s grand-father Pierre de Rohan had been a trusted man of Louis XI and had been the guardian of the duke of Valois (the future Francis I of France) before falling out of favour in 1506.) and Francoise de Penhoet.

Claude had a brother, Francois de Rohan-Gie who became an ambassador. and a sister, Jacqueline de Rohan-Gie, marquise of Rothelin.

== Later life ==
In 1530, at the age of twelve, Claude and her younger sister Jacqueline joined court as ladies in waiting [French: fille de honneurs] to the new French queen, Eleanor of Austria.Claude continued serving the queen after her marriage in 1537 to Claude de Beauvilliers but graduated to the position of lady-in-waiting [French: dame de honneur]. Her husband would however die just two years later.

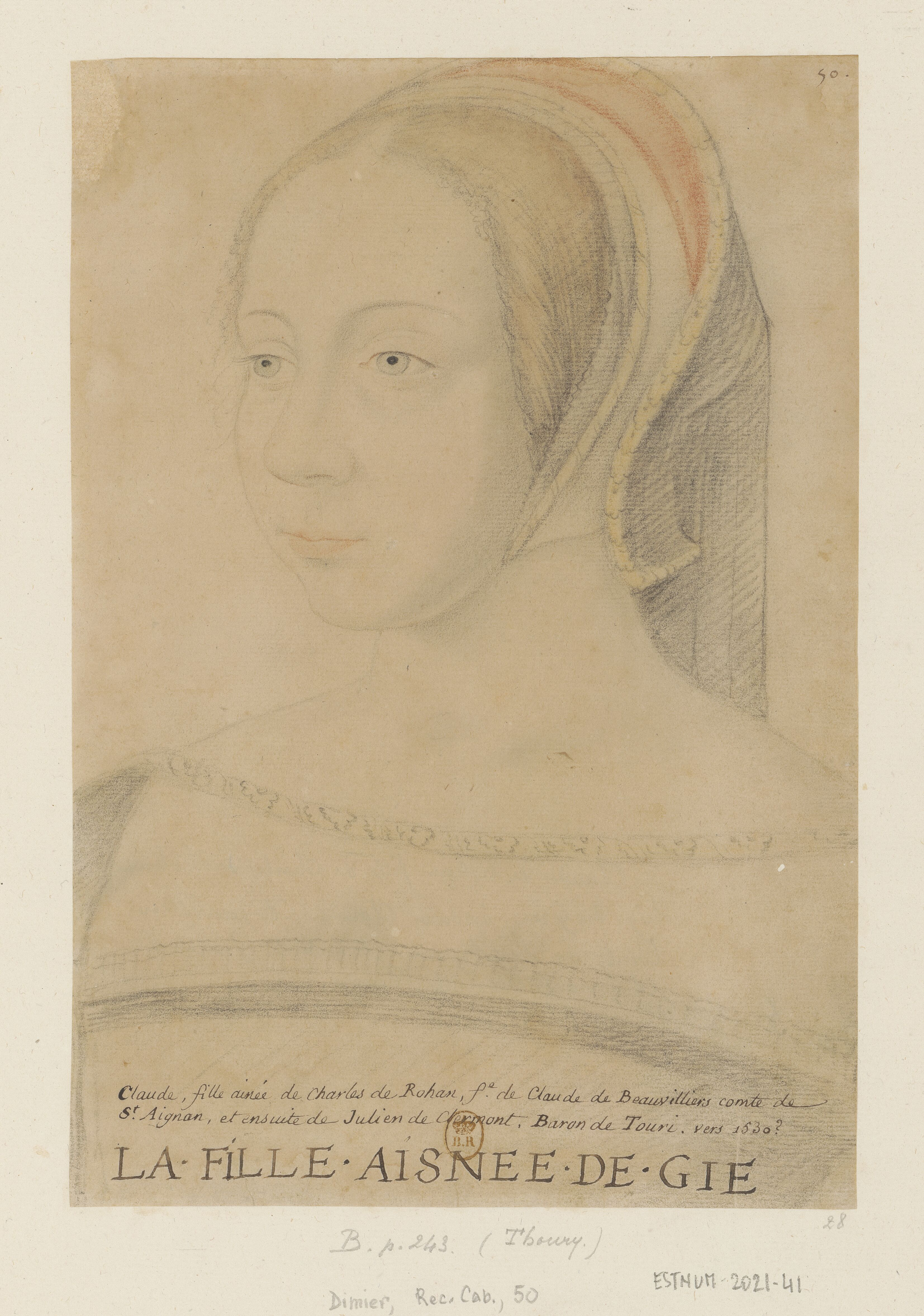
Claude by an unknown artist (after 1530)

Sometime around 1539–1540 Claude became the mistress to Francis I of France. It is said the king decided to build Château de Chambord in order to be near his lover. The building of the chateau was however already begun in 1519 long before the birth of Claude.

The closeness to Claudes residence would however have been practical for the king to visit her manor Château de Thoury. Later Claude and her husband sold manor to Francis I and relocated to Château de Marais, in Muides-sur-Loire.

In 1541 she was married for the second time to Julien de Clermont-Savoie (died in 1563).

Through this marriage Claude became connected to Diane de Poitiers as Claudes brother in law Antoine III de Clermont had married Dianes sister, Francoise de Poitiers in 1532

In the period 1543–47, Claude served as lady in waiting to the Dauphine, Catherine de' Medici.

She is the subject of several legendary stories and has been portrayed in fiction.

== Personal life ==
Claude married two times. She was married in 1537 Claude de Beauvilliers, comte de Saint-Aignan and governor of Blois (died in 1539); no issue.

From her second marriage to Julien de Clermont,the couple had two children:

- Gabriel de Clermont-Savoie (died in 1595); married Françoise de Noailles and had issue
- Louise de Clermont, married Annet de Pierrevive,seigneur de Lesigny. Had issue.

Claude was the ancestress of the Clermont-Tonerre

== Death ==
She died in 1582

Claudes descendant Amédée Marie de Clermont-Tonnerre (1781–1759), had a funeral monument commissioned from Aimé and Louis Duthoit . The cenotaph features praying sculptures in 16th century style of her and her husband in Eglise Saint Vincent de Bertangles in 1852
