= Laurence de Montmorency =

Laurence de Montmorency (1571–1654) was a French court official. She served as Première dame d'honneur to the queen of France, Anne of Austria, from 1615 until 1624. Until 1618, she shared her office with Inés de la Torre.

== Life ==
Laurence de Montmorency was born at Chateau of Méru as the youngest daughter of Claude de Clermont, baron de Montoison and Louise de Rouvroy Saint Simon. Her maternal grandfather had been chamberlain to Eleanor of Austria. She had two siblings Antoine and Catherine. Her mother died when she was just 4 years old.

=== Marriages ===
Laurence was married on the 18 January 1589 at the age of eighteen to Jean, Comte de Dzimieu, seigneur de Sure and a lieutenant in the company of Laurent de Maugiron. He was killed in battle during the siege of Givors in 1591.

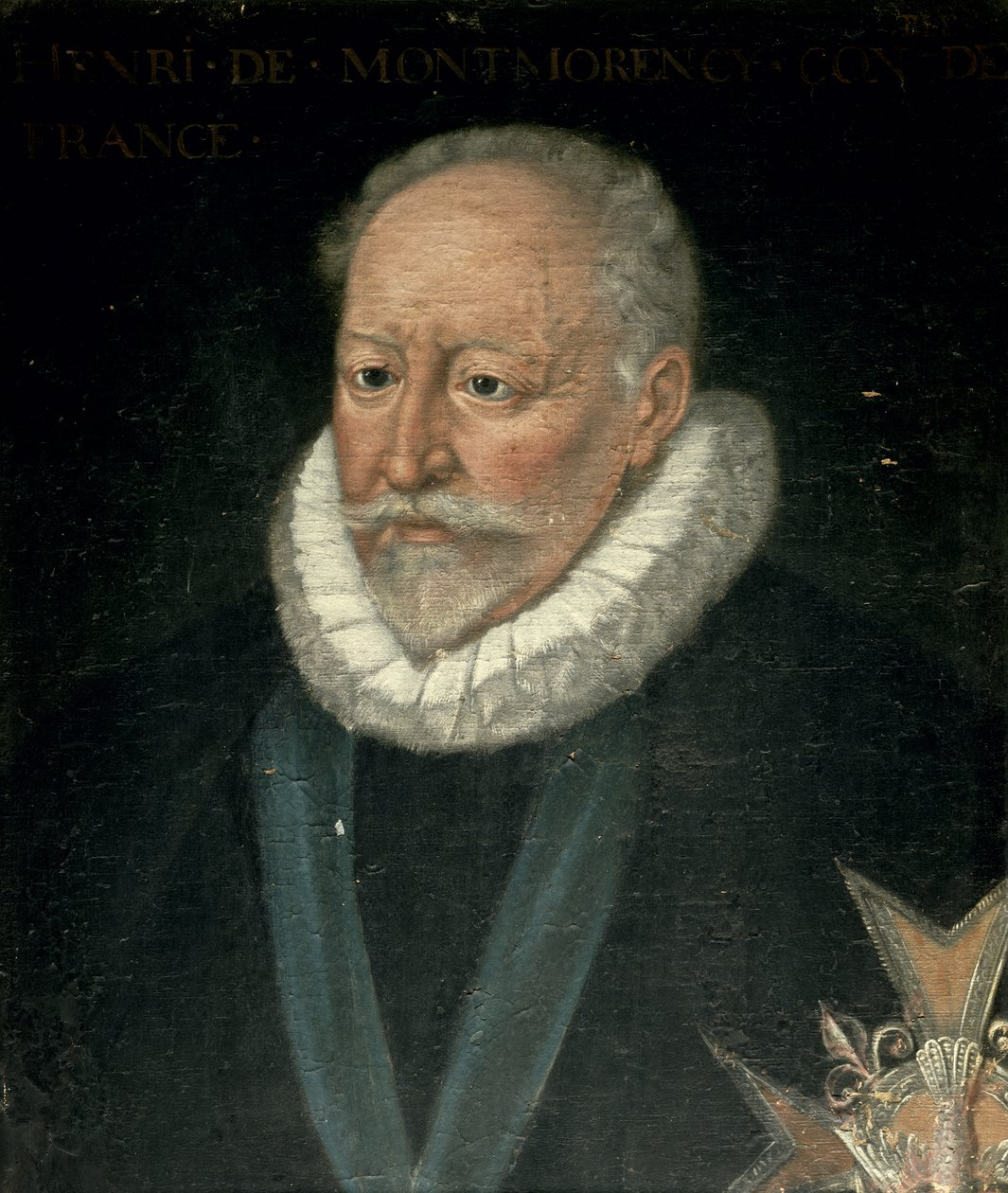
Henri I of Montmorency, Laurences husband

Now a widow Laurence became a companion to her niece, Louise de Budos. Louise was married to Constable Henri I de Montmorency. Laurence was the maternal aunt of Montmorency's second wife Louise de Budos. Louise died in 1589 and in September 1599 at Beaucaire, Laurence and the duke married secretly. She was 27 and he was 63. The marriage had to be done with dispensation from the Pope because of Montmorency's marriage to her niece they were seen as related within a prohibited degree.

Additionally, both Laurence and Henri shared ancestors, they were descended from Jean II de Montmorency. Laurence through two of his sons: Louis and Guillaume de Montmorency. Henri being the grandson of Guillaume and great-grandson of Jean II, and Laurence being a great-great-granddaughter of the aforementioned Jean. They were also the descendants of Pierre d'Orgemont.

The relation was distant and not enough to warrant any comments from the couples' contemporaries.

Montmorency, some time after his marriage, found himself dissatisfied with the union possibly because he found her too low in birth. Thus, he wanted to separate from his wife and pressured her to join her niece and his former sister-in law Laurence de Budos in the Abbey of Saint-Trinité.

Laurence and her relatives then petitioned the king for his protection over her. Thus, the marriage was declared legal and there would be no talk of an annulment. Although, while Montmorency was unable to divorce his wife, he still had power over his wife as her husband and had her banished to the Chateau de Bel-Villiers, where she would remain until she was widowed in 1614.

=== Lady in waiting ===
In 1615, she was appointed Première dame d'honneur to the new queen of France, Anne of Austria, upon her arrival in France. However, when Anne arrived at the French royal court in Paris, a dilemma occurred, as she was given a new household composed of Frenchmen upon her arrival, but did not wish to dismiss her Spanish retinue. A compromise was met where she was allowed to keep both households. This resulted in a situation where several offices at her court was split, and the post of Première dame d'honneur was consequently shared by Laurence de Montmorency and her Spanish counterpart Inés de la Torre, just as the second rank office of Dame d'atour was shared between the Spanish Luisa de Osorio and her French counterpart Antoinette de Vernet.

In 1618, Anne's Spanish courtiers were sent home, and Laurence de Montmorency became her only Première dame d'honneur. In 1619, however, the new office of Surintendante de la Maison de la Reine was introduced with the appointment of Marie de Rohan, outranking her. She wished to resign, but stayed to nurse the queen, who fell sick at this time; when Marie de Rohan was banished in 1622, she again became the highest ranked lady-in-waiting at court, a position she is said to have performed with diplomatic charm.

== Death ==
Laurence died on 29 September 1654 in Villiers-le-Bel, Val-d'Oise at the age of 83.

Court offices
Preceded by Antoinette de Guercheville	Première dame d'honneur to the Queen of France; 1615–1624 (With Inés de la Torre)	Succeeded by Charlotte de Lannoy
