= Jean-Balthazar d'Adhémar =

French soldier and diplomat (1736–1790)

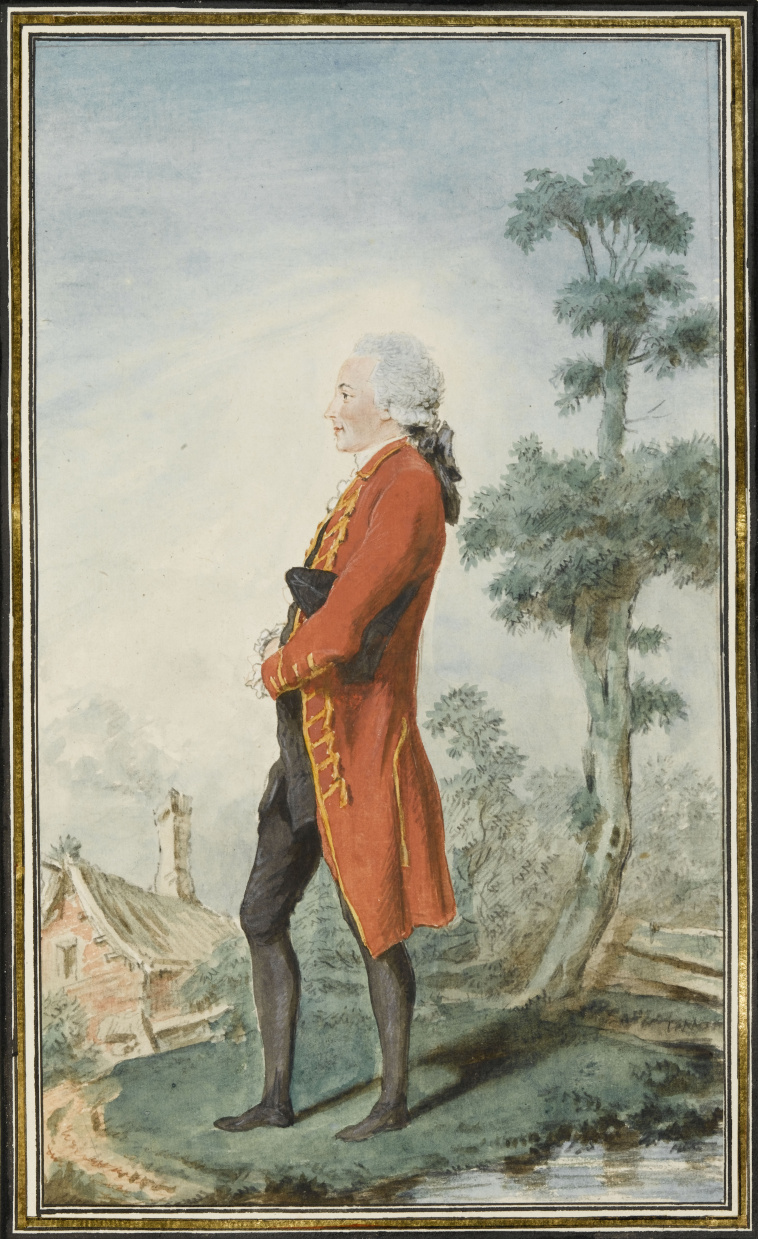

Adhémar ancestral arms

Jean-Balthazar d'Adhémar or Azémar de Montfalcon (Nîmes 1736 – Meulan 1790) was a French soldier and diplomat.

Styled Comte d'Adhémar after 1767, he was French Ambassador to Belgium Austriacum from 1778 to 1783 and to Great Britain from 1783 to 1787. Upon arriving at Brussels he joined the Heureuse Rencontre masonic lodge.

During the Count's mission to London, he liaised with the governments of Charles James Fox and then William Pitt the Younger, but was unsuccessful in securing an entente with France's ancien régime.

D'Adhémar was a Knight of Malta and of the Order of Saint-Louis. He was married to Gabrielle Pauline d'Adhémar.

== Bibliography ==
- (in French) Laure Cottignon, L’ambassade à Londres du comte d’Adhémar, Paris, 1996.
- (in French) Paul Vaucher, Recueil des instructions aux ambassadeurs et ministres de France depuis le traité de Westphalie jusqu’à la Révolution française, t. III (Angleterre), Paris, CNRS, 1965, 583 p.

== See also ==
- List of Ambassadors of France to Great Britain
- Famille d'Adhémar
