= Adèle Duchâtel =

French court official (1782–1860)

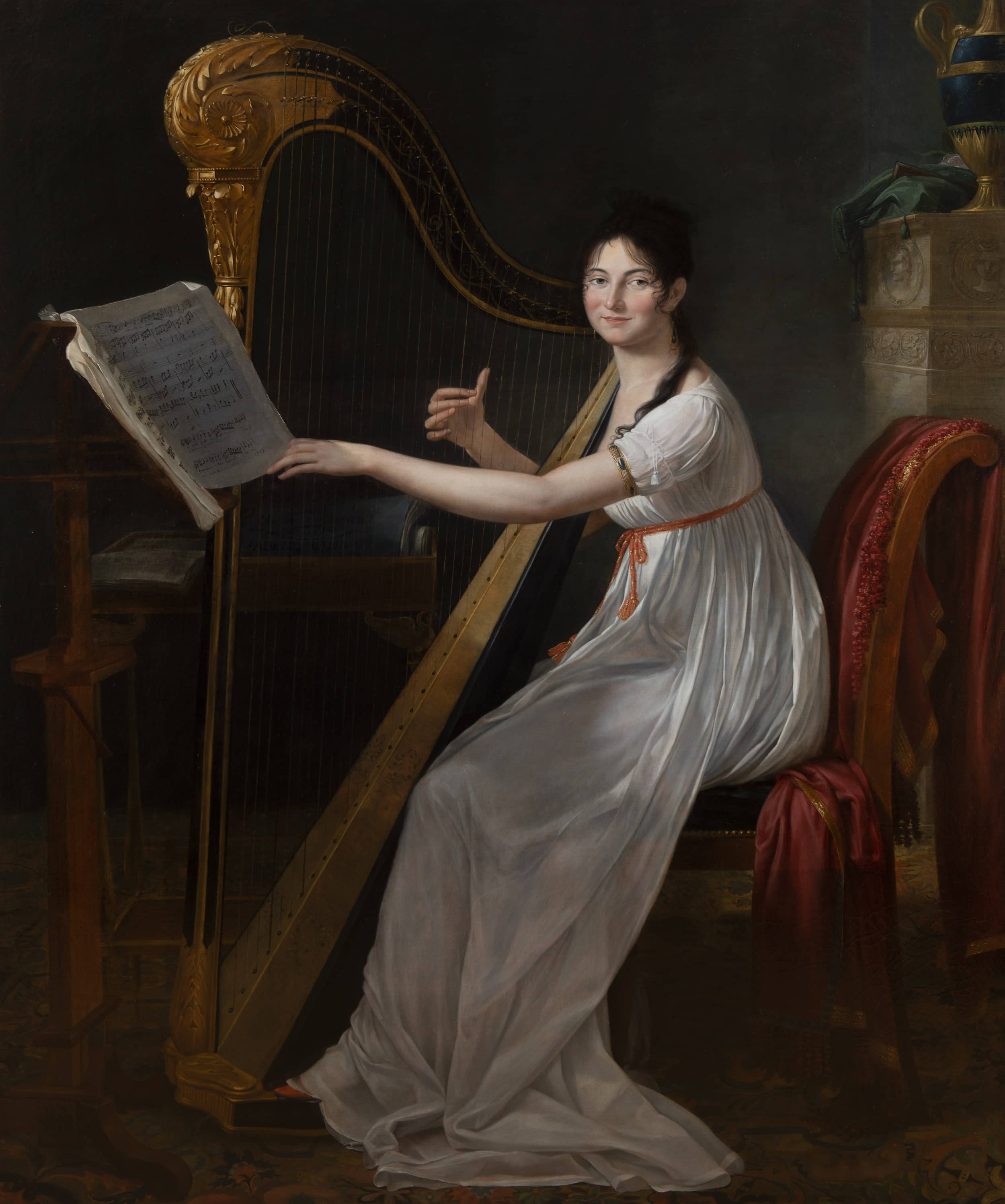
Adele Papin playing the harp - Guillon-Lethiere

Adèle Duchâtel (1782–1860), was a French court official.

She served as lady-in-waiting (Dame du Palais) to Empress Joséphine de Beauharnais in 1804–1810, and to Empress Marie Louise in 1810–1814.

She was married to politician and official Charles Jacques Nicolas Duchâtel.

She had an affair with Emperor Napoleon I in 1804.
