= Louise de Cipierre =

French court official

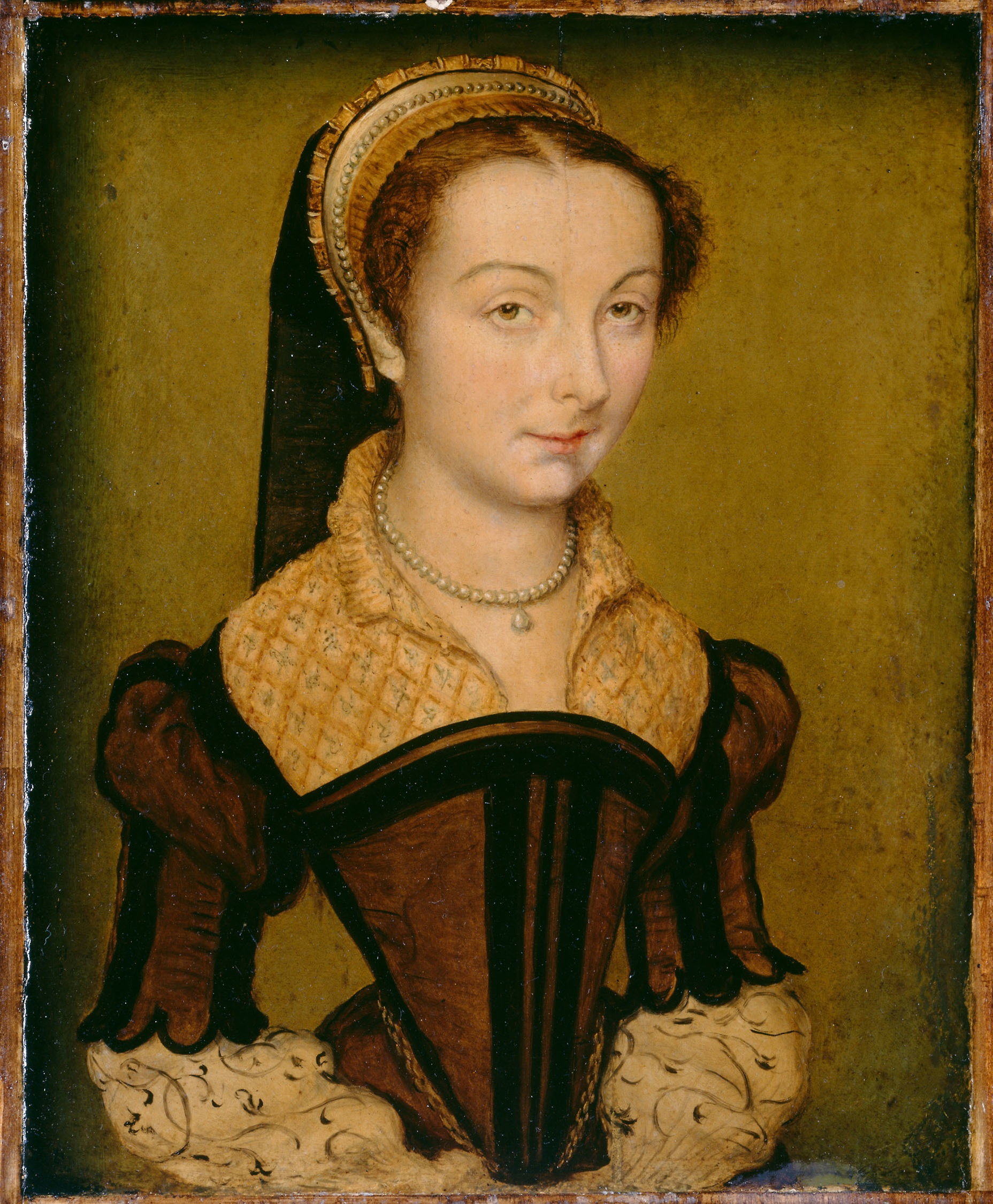
Corneille de Lyon - Portrait of Louise de Halluin, dame de Cipierre - 1933.1061 - Art Institute of Chicago

Louise de Cipierre, née d'Halluin (died 1585) was a French court official. She served as Première dame d'honneur to the queen of France, Louise of Lorraine, from 1583 until 1585.

== Life ==
Louise de Cipierre was the daughter of Antoine d'Halluin and Louise de Crèvecœur. She married Philibert de Marcilly, seigneur de Cipierre in 1556.

She served as (Dame or dame du palais) to Catherine de' Medici in 1564–1583.

In 1583, Fulvie de Randan was appointed to the office of Première dame d'honneur to the new queen of France, Louise of Lorraine. She was given the position in the request of the queen, who was attracted to her piety, but the king found her to be too austere for the royal court, and although he granted the queen's wish, he split the office in two and appointed his own candidate, the more fashionable Louise de Cipierre to share the office with her. As Première dame d'honneur, she was responsible for the female courtiers, controlling the budget, purchases, annual account and staff list, daily routine and presentations to the queen.

Court offices
Preceded by Jeanne de Dampierre	Première dame d'honneur to the Queen of France; 1583–1585	Succeeded by Fulvie de Randan
