= Fulvie de Randan =

French court official

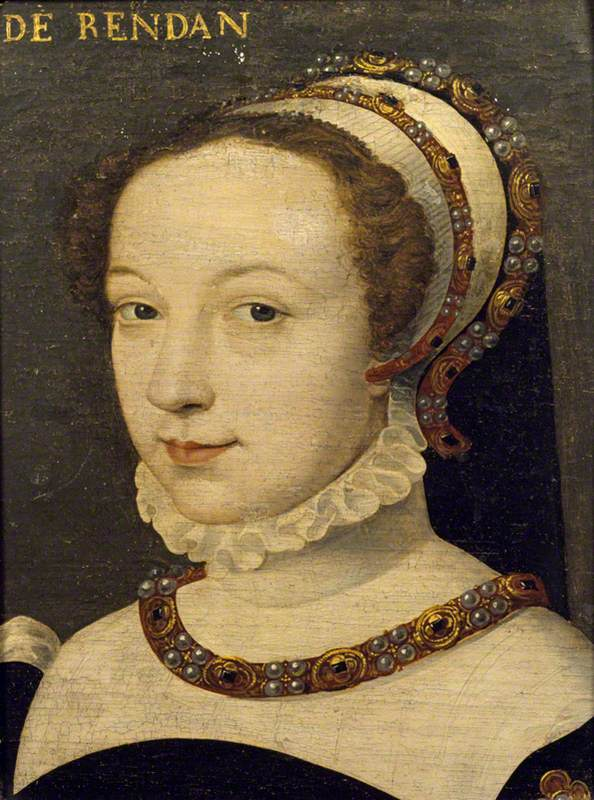
Fulvie de Randan, portrait by François Clouet

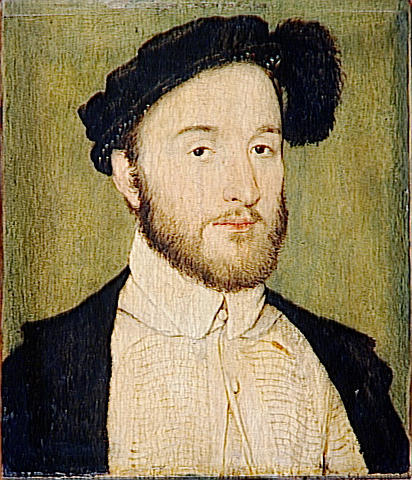
Charles de La Rochefoucauld, Comte de Randan, by Corneille de Lyon, in the Louvre

Fulvie de Randan, née Pic de Mirandole (1533–1607) was a French court official. She served as Première dame d'honneur to the queen of France, Louise of Lorraine, from 1583 until 1601.

== Life ==
Fulvie de Randan was the daughter of Galeotto II Pico della Mirandola (d.1551) and Hippolita di Gonzaga-Sabionetta. She married Charles de La Rochefoucauld, Comte de Randan (1520–1562) in 1555. Her husband was killed at the siege of Rouen in 1562. The couple had five children, among them François. Her sister Sylvie married her husband's brother François III de La Rochefoucauld, prince of Marcillac, count of Roucy and baron of Verteuil, in a double marriage of siblings.

She was a fille d'honneur, maid of honour, to Catherine de' Medici. In 1583, she was appointed to the office of Première dame d'honneur to the new queen of France, Louise of Lorraine. She was given the position at the request of the queen, who was attracted to her piety, but the king found her to be too austere for the royal court, and although he granted the queen's wish, she split the office in two and appointed the more fashionable Louise de Cipierre to share the office with her: when de Cipierre died just two years later, however, de Randan did not have to share the office anymore. As Première dame d'honneur, she was responsible for the female courtiers, controlling the budget, purchases, annual account and staff list, daily routine and presentations to the queen.

Fulvie de Randan was described as a beauty and a Catholic fanatic, determined to live out her life in an eternal mourning period after she was widowed, and known for her support for the Catholic League during the French Wars of Religion. In 1570, she was known to have supported a marriage between Margaret of Valois and Henry I, Duke of Guise. She was outspoken about her support of the Catholic League, and demonstrated them both during the Catholic uprising in 1585 as well as during the conflict between the king and the Ligue in 1588.

Brantôme described her:

"She wore a veil habitually, never showing her hair; yet spite of careless head-dress and her neglect of appearances, her great beauty was none the less manifest. The late M. de Guise, late deceased, was used always to call her naught but the nun; for she was attired and put on like a religious. This he would say by way of jest and merriment with her; for he did admire and honour her greatly, seeing how well affectioned and attached she was to his service and all his house."

Court offices
Preceded by Louise de Cipierre	Première dame d'honneur to the Queen of France; 1583–1589	Succeeded by Antoinette de Pons
