= Antoinette de Guercheville =

French court lady and countess

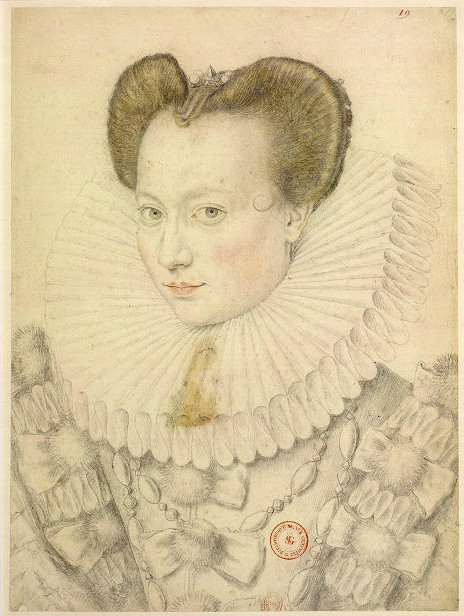
Antoinette de Pons Quesnel

Antoinette de Pons-Ribérac, comtesse de La Roche-Guyon and marquise de Guercheville (1560 - 16 January 1632) was a French court official. She served as Première dame d'honneur to the queen of France, Marie de' Medici, from 1600 until 1632. She was foremost known as Madame de Guercheville.

== Life ==
Antoinette was the daughter of Antoine de Pons-Ribérac, comte de Marennes, and Marie de Montchenu, dame de Guercheville, and married firstly to Henri de Silly, comte de La Roche-Guyon (d. 1586), and secondly, in 1594, to Charles du Plessis-Liancourt, comte de Beaumont.

Antoinette de Pons was described as a virtuous and religious beauty. She was first introduced to Henry IV of France after the Battle of Ivry in 1590, and it is known that he courted her, but it is not believed that he was successful, and she was thus never his mistress.

In 1600, she was appointed to the office of Première dame d'honneur or chief lady-of-honour to the new queen of France, Marie de' Medici, and as such had the task of supervising the female courtiers and expenses of the queen's household.

She acted as the protector of Bernard Palissy. She was known for her interest in the French colonization of North America, and supported both the French colony at Mount Desert Island and René Le Coq de La Saussaye as well as the colonial project of Jean de Biencourt de Poutrincourt et de Saint-Just in Acadia financially, and used her influence and her office at court to gather support and collect donations for them.

Court offices
Preceded by Fulvie de Randan	Première dame d'honneur to the Queen of France; 1600–1610	Succeeded by Inés de la Torre (With Laurence de Montmorency)
