= Jacquette de Montberon =

French architect

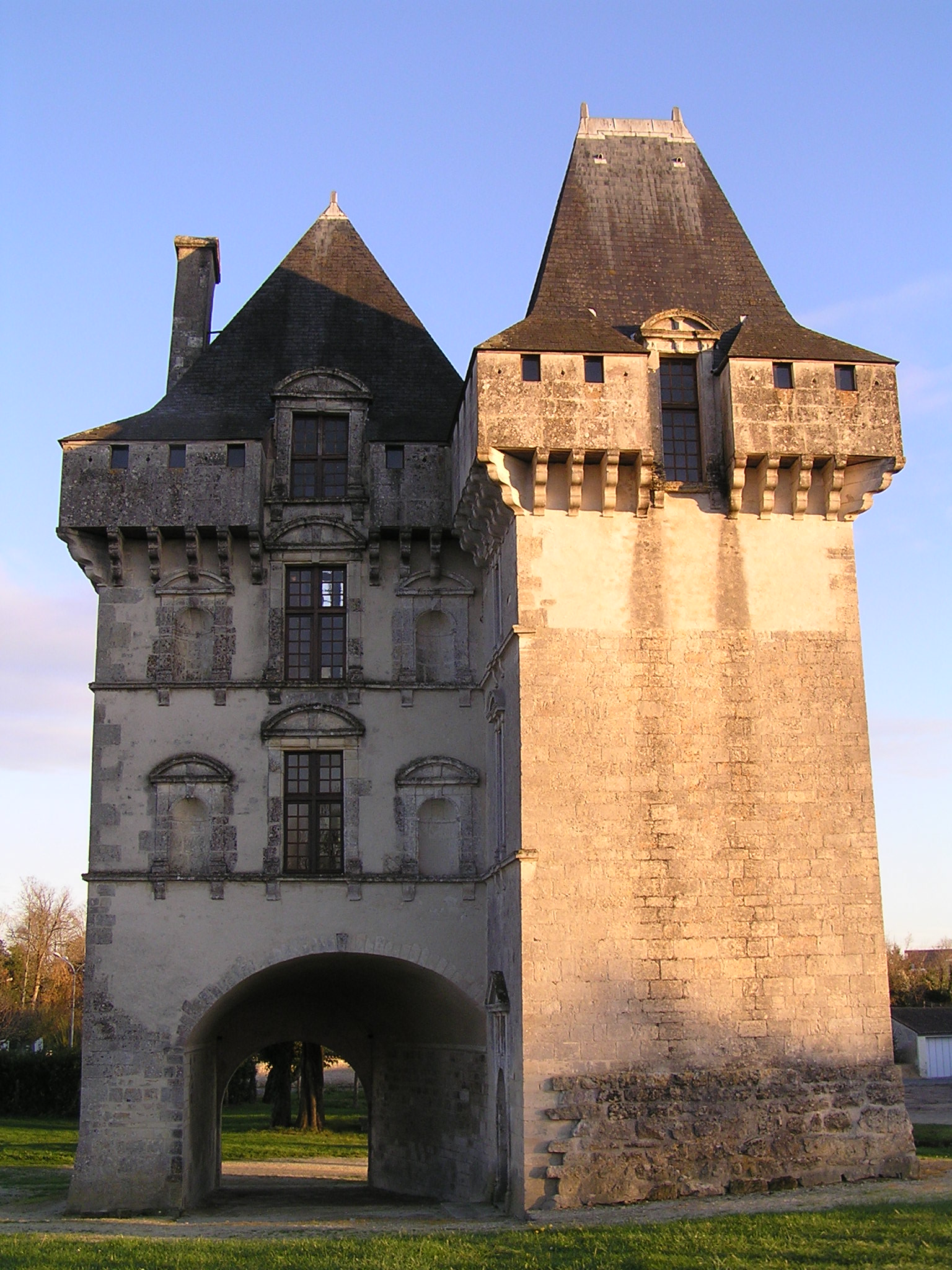
Château de Matha [Matha Castle], France, in which remains a Renaissance pavilion built under the direction of built under the direction of Jacquette of Montbron between 1582 and 1587

Jacquette de Montberon [de Montbron] (1542 – June 28, 1598) was a 16th century humanist, architect, and lady-in-waiting to Queens Catherine de' Medici and Louise de Lorraine. She is the only woman in France known to have held the title of Architect during the Renaissance.

== Biography ==
Jacquette de Montberon was born in 1542, into one of the most powerful families of the County of Angoulême. She was the third daughter of François de Montbron (or Montberon), baron of Villefort and Beaulieu, captain of Blaye, and of Marie-Jeanne de Montpezat. After the death of her older Brother René de Montbron, Baron d'Archiac, who was killed at the Battle of Gravelines, Jacquette became the sole heiress and the remaining representative of the elder branch of the House of Montbron. At the age of 16 she married André de Bourdeille (1519), older brother of writer, columnist and soldier Pierre de Bourdeilles, viscount of Bourdeilles, lieutenant of King Henry III, and governor and seneschal of Périgord. In marriage, Jacquette brought her husband properties in Matha, Archiac and Sertonville in Angoumois as dowry. Together, Montberon and Bourdeille had six children, four daughters and two sons. In 1582, after 24 years of marriage, Bourdeille died, leaving her a widow and the sole heir responsible for his properties.

Between 1582 and 1587, Jacquette had a castle built in Matha, inspired by the Italian architectural standards that she had read about in books of Sebastiano Serilo.

In 1587, Jacquette de Montbron entered the service of the Queen-Mother Catherine de' Medici, where, impressed by the courage of the now widow, Catherine de'Medici made her a Lady-in-waiting. She became one of the Queen's favourites and spent time at the Valois court up until 1588, when Jacquette regained her provincial fiefdoms and returned to her lands.

The following year in 1589, Jacquette received a bequest of 4,000 crowns from the Queen which she used to construct a Renaissance castle next to the old Bourdeille Castle, in Périgord. Her brother-in-law Brantôme specified that it was "all her own invention and design". She supervised the construction site, "taking up the L-square and the T-square and drawing her future home with her own hands".

== Humanist Acts ==
In 1588, during the War of the Three Henrys, the last of the Wars of Religion, Jacquette de Montbron gave refuge to Catholic notables who had come asking for protections. Besieged in her castle of Mathas by the Prince of Condé, Henri I of Bourbon-Condé, one of the main leaders of the Protestant party, she refused to hand over those who had taken refuge. Encouraged by her brother-in-law, she replied that she feared "neither his cannon nor his siege", and it wasn't until the death of the prince in March 1588, that the threat was lifted.

== Death & Remembrance ==
In 1596 Jacquette de Montberon is deeply affected by the loss of her daughter Renée, and falls into melancholy. Not long after, on June 28, 1598, Jacquette de Montberon dies at the age of 56, never having remarried. Her obituary was written by her brother-in-law, the writer Brantôme, and is considered one of the primary resources for facts about her life.

"Sur tous les artz, elle ayma fort la geométrie et architecture, y estant très-experte et ingénieuse, comme elle a bien faicte aproistre en ce superbe édifi ce et belle maison de Bourdeille, qu’elle fi t bastir de son invention et seule façon, qui est très-admirable. Aussy Salomon dict que la sage et honneste femme faut qu’elle fi t bastir sa maison. Tousjours elle a faict bastir et remuer pierres en toutes ses maisons, estant tousjours assidue en quelque belle action, comme à ses ouvrages, auxquelz elle fut fort industrieuse et labourieuse"

- René de Montbron

"[Of all the arts, she loved geometry and architecture, in which she was expert and ingenious, how well she has done in this superb building and beautiful house of Bourdeille, that she built of her invention and volition, which is very admirable. Aussy Salomon says that the wise and honest woman that she built her house. Always she was building and moving stones in all her houses, being always assiduous in some fine deed, as in her works, to which she was very industrious and laborious.]"

- René de Montbron
