= Claire Emilie MacDonell =

French courtier (1817–1905)

- Marquise de Las Marismas de Guadalquivir
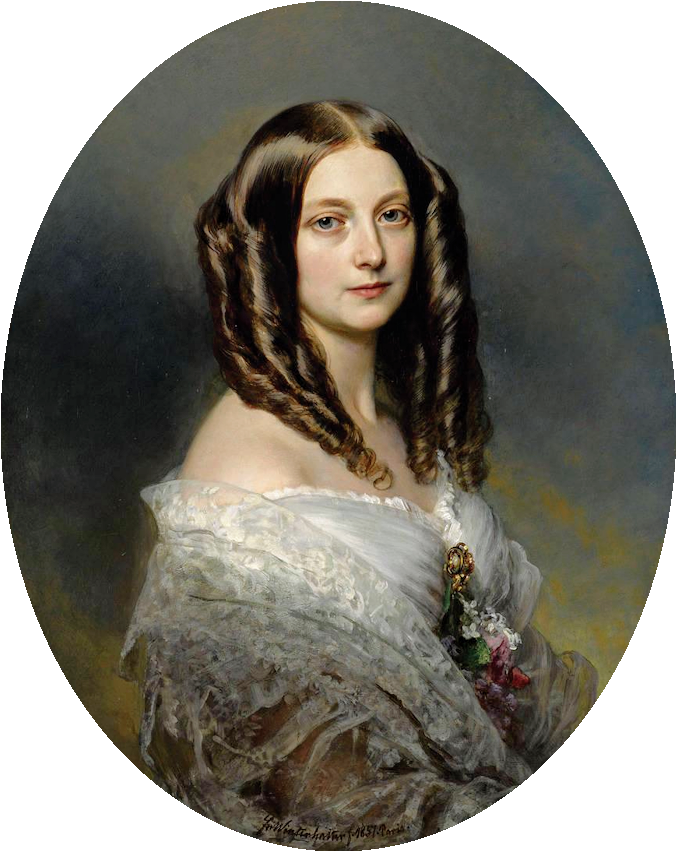
- Born: 24 October 1817
- Died: 23 April 1905 (aged 87); Paris, France
- Spouses: Alexandre Aguado Moreno; Onésipe Aguado, Vicomte Aguado
- Issue: Carmen Aguado, Duchesse de Montmorency
- Father: Hugh MacDonell
- Mother: Ida Louise Ulrich
- Occupation: Dame du Palais to Empress Eugénie de Montijo

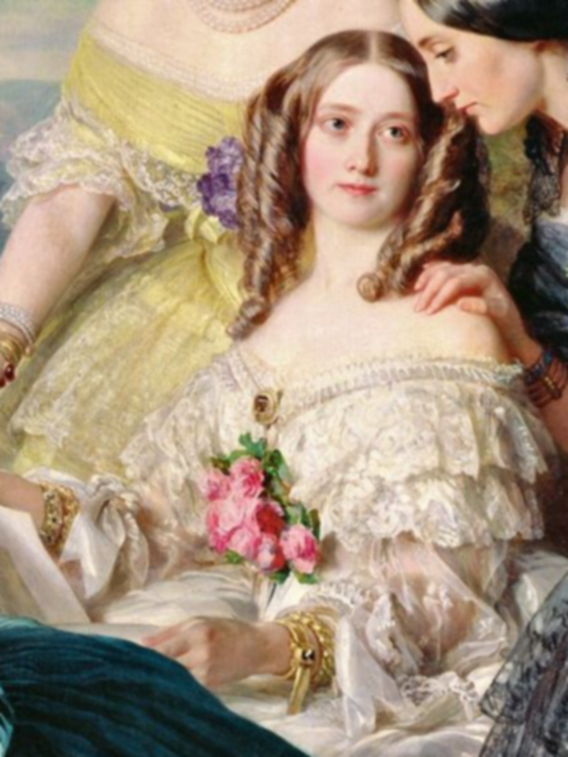
Claire Emilie MacDonell, depicted in The Empress Eugenie Surrounded by her Ladies in Waiting

Claire Emilie MacDonell, Marquise de Las Marismas de Guadalquivir (24 October 1817 – 23 April 1905) was a courtier of the French imperial court. She served as lady-in-waiting to Empress Eugénie de Montijo from 1853 to 1870.

== Life ==
=== Early life ===
Born on 24 October 1817, Claire Emilie MacDonell was the daughter of Hugh MacDonell and Ida Louise Ulrich. In 1841, Claire married Alexandre Aguado Moreno (1813–1861); the Marquis de Las Marismas de Guadalquivir had three children including Carmen Aguado, Duchesse de Montmorency. Alexandre died in a mental asylum, and Claire soon remarried her former brother-in-law, Onésipe Aguado, Vicomte Aguado (1830–1893), in 1863.

=== Lady-in-waiting ===
After the introduction of the Second Empire and the marriage of Emperor Napoleon III to Eugénie de Montijo, Claire Emilie was appointed lady-in-waiting (dame du Palais) to the new empress in 1853, and would continue to serve until 1870. The ladies-in-waiting consisted of:

- Grand-Maitresse: Anne Debelle
- Dame d'honneur: Pauline Marie Ghislaine
- Dame du Palais: Adrienne de Villeneuve-Bargemont
- Dame du Palais: Anne Eve Mortier
- Dame du Palais: Jane Mary Thorne
- Dame du Palais: Louise Poitelon
- Dame du Palais: Nathalie de Ségur
- Dame du Palais: Claire Emilie

Those of the dame du Palais rank were selected among the acquaintances to Eugénie prior to her marriage, and who alternated in pairs fulfilling the daily duties. Claire belonged to the personal friends of the empress from her upbringing in Spain.

Claire was a social success in the Parisian high society life, and was described as a beauty with an "ever lovely expression" and as "the most pleasant woman in Paris". She was a celebrated society hostess, and her home quickly became known as the meeting place of the Second Empire high society in Paris, which foreign princes frequented when visiting Paris.

=== Later life ===
After the fall of the Empire, she retired from high society life as her loyalty to the former empress made her feel it to be disloyal to participate in society life under a new administration.

Claire Emilie died on 23 April 1905 in Paris, France, at the age of 87.

== Legacy ==
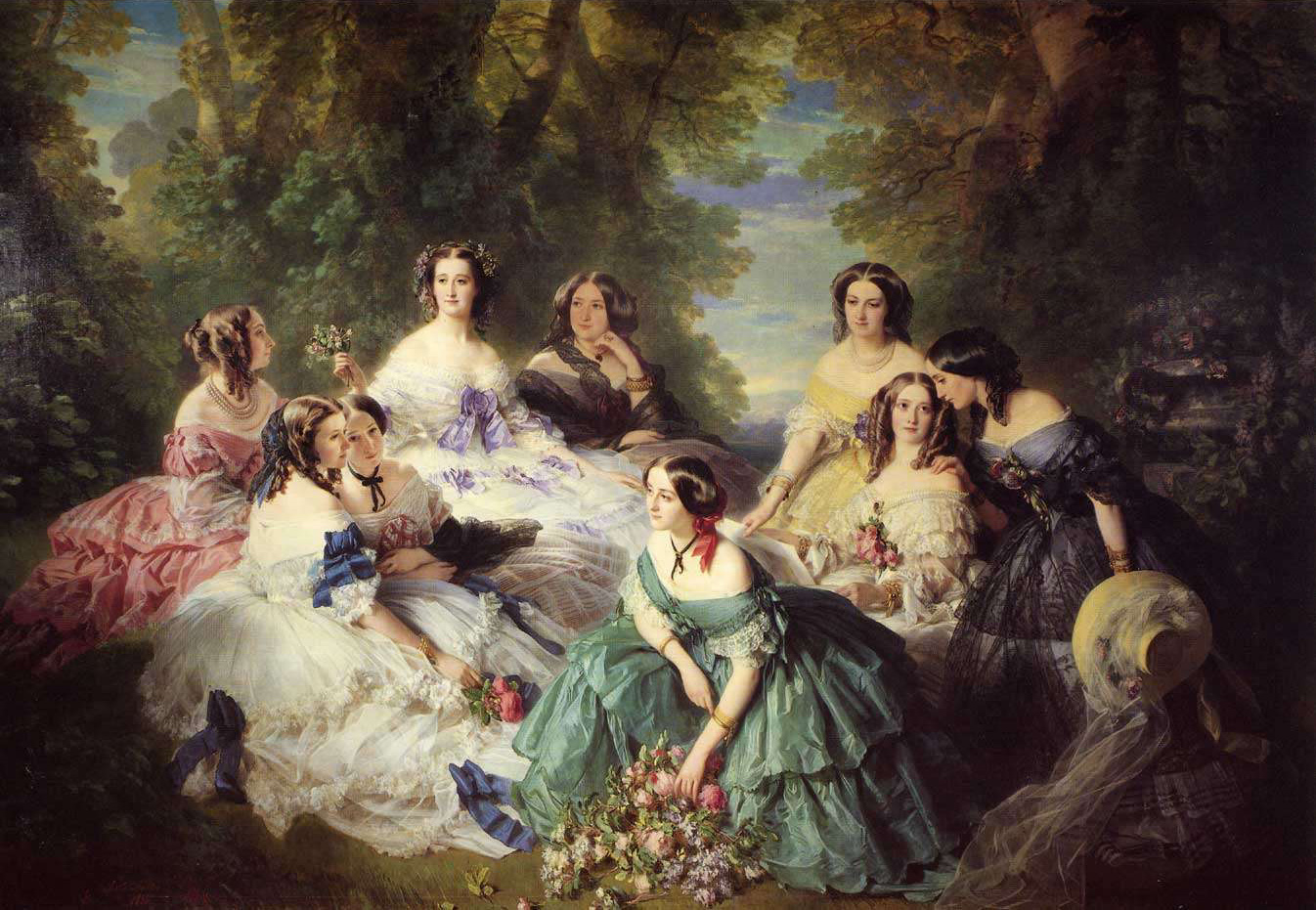
The Empress Eugenie (upper left, with the purple bow) in 1855, surrounded by her ladies in waiting, painted by her favourite artist, Franz Xaver Winterhalter.

She belongs to the ladies-in-waiting depicted with Eugenie in the famous painting Empress Eugénie Surrounded by her Ladies in Waiting by Franz Xaver Winterhalter from 1855. Her daughter, Carmen Aguado, was also subject of a portrait by Franz Xaver Winterhalter.
