= Adrienne de Villeneuve-Bargemont =

French courtier

- Comtesse de Montebello
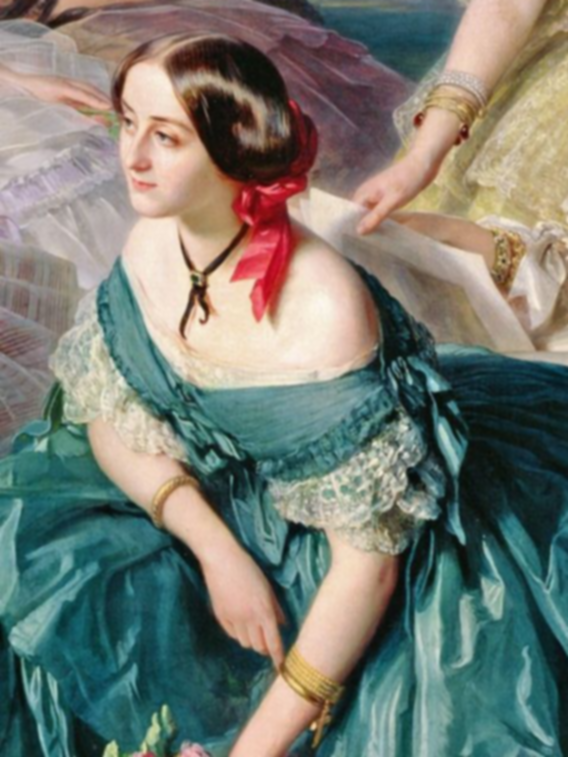
- Portrait by Franz Xaver Winterhalter, 1855
- Born: 1826
- Died: 7 June 1870 (aged 43–44)
- Noble family: de Villeneuve
- Spouse: Gustave Olivier Lannes de Montebello
- Issue: Jean Alban, 2.Baron Lannes de Montebello
- Father: Jean-Paul-Alban Villeneuve-Barcement
- Mother: Emma de Carbonnel de Canisy
- Occupation: Dame du Palais to Empress Eugénie de Montijo

Adrienne de Villeneuve-Bargemont, comtesse de Montebello (1826–1870), was a French courtier. She served as lady-in-waiting (dame de Palais) to the empress of France, Eugénie de Montijo.

== Life ==
She was the daughter of Jean-Paul-Alban Villeneuve-Barcement and Emma de Carbonnel de Canisy, and married to Gustave Olivier Lannes de Montebello in 1846.

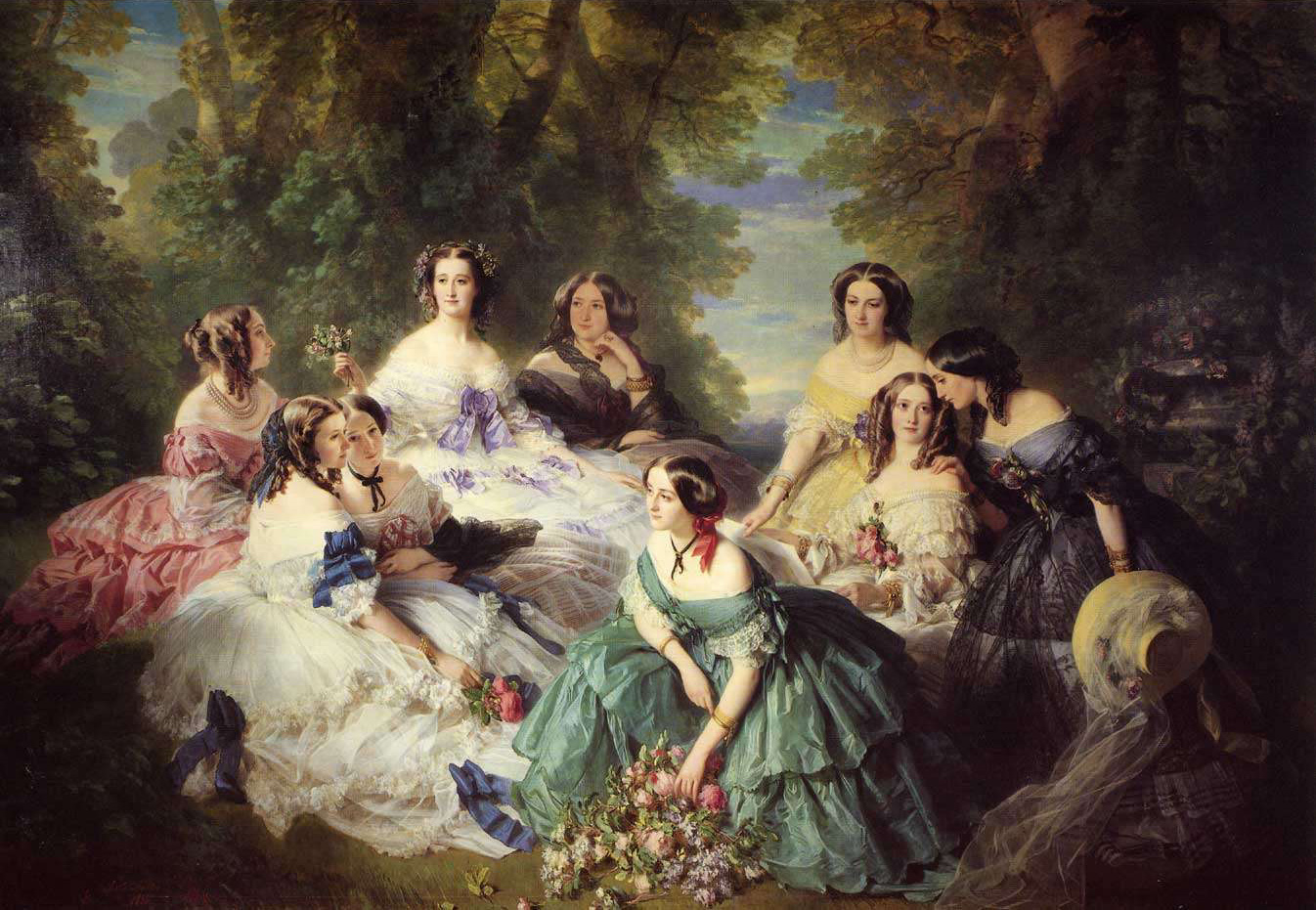
The Empress Eugenie (upper left, with the purple bow) in 1855, surrounded by her ladies in waiting, painted by her favourite artist, Franz Xaver Winterhalter.

After the introduction of the Second Empire and the marriage of Emperor Napoleon III to Eugénie de Montijo, she was appointed to the Household of the new Empress. The ladies-in-waiting of the new Empress consisted of a Grand-Maitresse or senior lady-in-waiting, the Princesse d'Essling; a Dame d'honneur or deputy, the Duchesse de Bassano, who both attended court on grand functions; and six (later twelve) Dame du Palais, who were selected from among the acquaintances to the Empress prior to her marriage, and who alternated in pairs fulfilling the daily duties. She kept her position from 1853 to 1870.

She was described as charming and "one of the most agreeable women of the court". She was also noted to have been a devout Catholic who had close contact with the priesthood, among them her personal friend the Dominican Father Hyacinthe.

When she was on duty at court, the empress often invited her son to join her, and the boy composed poems who he read to the empress. She accompanied her spouse when he was made ambassador to Rome in 1860, where she was described as a "delightful ambassadress, and was very popular in Roman society". During her years in Rome, she nevertheless returned to France, once a year, to fulfill her duties as lady-in-waiting.

The empress was reportedly "particularly attached" to her:

"Until the close of her life the Empress bestowed upon Mme. de Montebello constant proofs of her affection and interest, and mourned her loss deeply, as that of a friend." and when she died, empress Eugenie commented that she now felt that a friend waited for her on “the other side.”

She died on 7 June 1870 after an illness which had at that point affected her for several years.

== Legacy ==
She belongs to the ladies-in-waiting depicted with Eugenie in the famous painting Empress Eugénie Surrounded by her Ladies in Waiting by Franz Xaver Winterhalter from 1855.
