= Nathalie de Ségur =

French courtier (1827–1910)

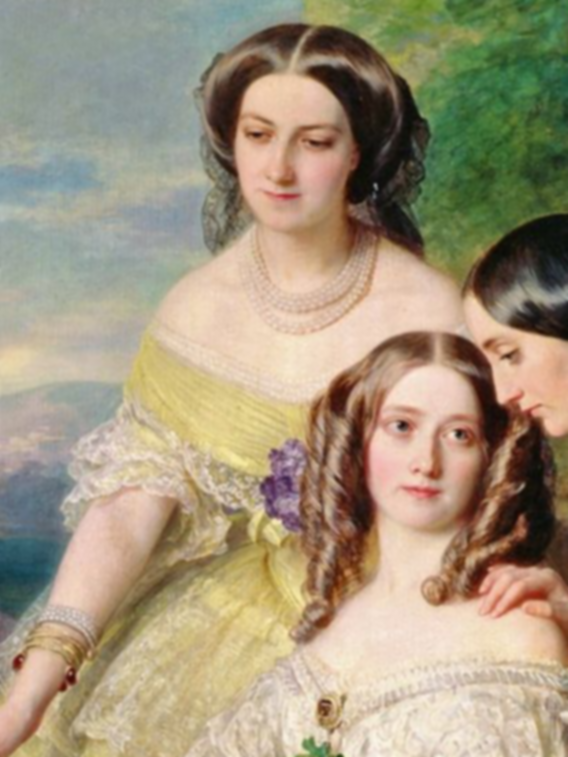
Nathalie de Ségur

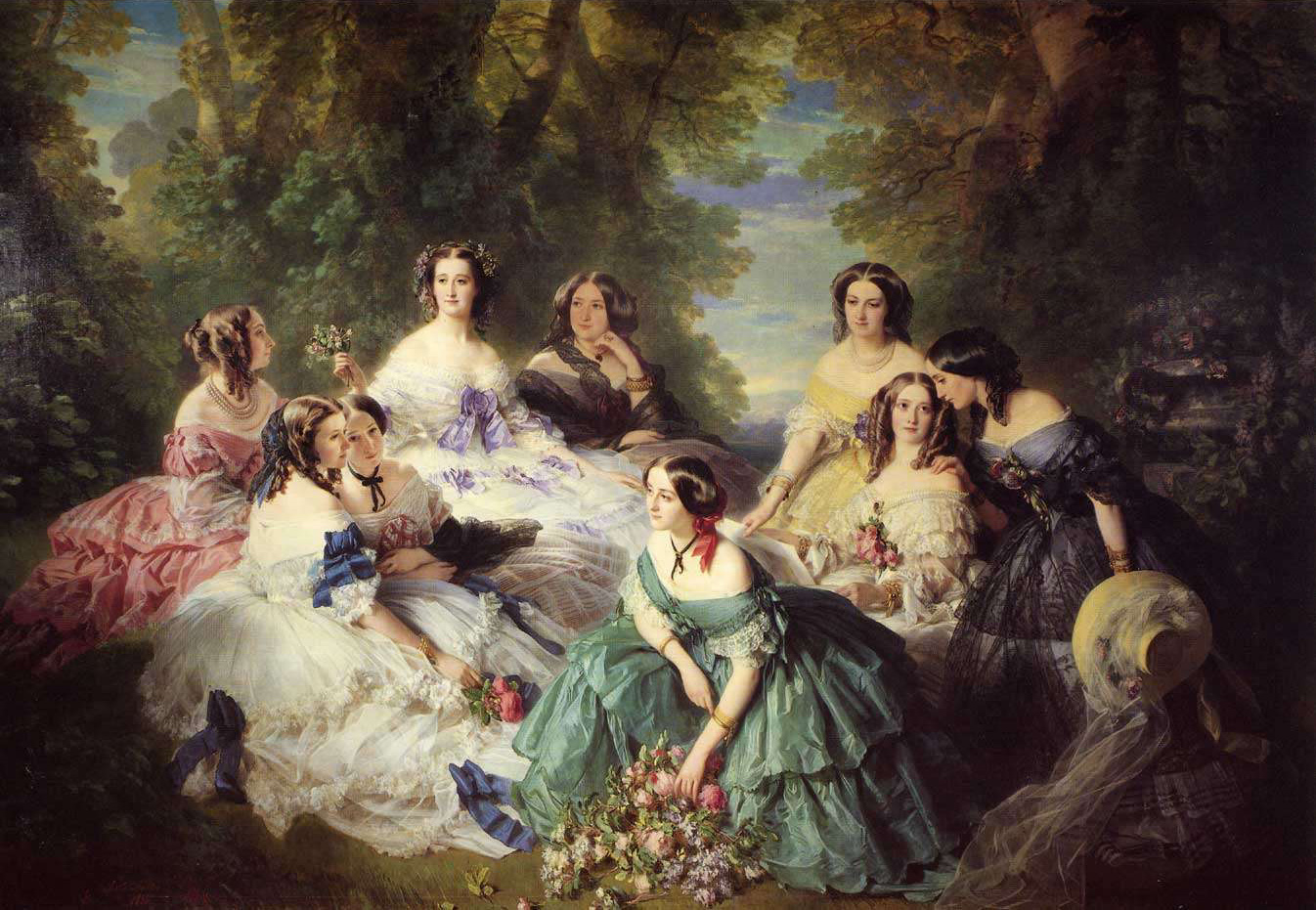
The Empress Eugenie (upper left, with the purple bow) in 1855, surrounded by her ladies in waiting, painted by her favourite artist, Franz Xaver Winterhalter.

Nathalie de Ségur, baronne de Malaret (1 May 1827 – 12 March 1910) was a French courtier. She served as lady-in-waiting (dame de Palais) to the empress of France, Eugénie de Montijo.

== Life ==
She was the daughter of Eugène Henri Raymond, Count of Ségur and Countess of Ségur, and married to the diplomat Joseph Alphonse Paul Martin d'Ayguesvives, baron de Malaret, in 1846.

After the introduction of the Second Empire and the marriage of Emperor Napoleon III to Eugénie de Montijo, she was appointed to the Household of the new Empress. The ladies-in-waiting of the new Empress consisted of a Grand-Maitresse or senior lady-in-waiting, the Princesse d'Essling; a Dame d'honneur or deputy, the Duchesse de Bassano, who both attended court on grand functions; and six (later twelve) Dame du Palais, who were selected from among the acquaintances to the Empress prior to her marriage, and who alternated in pairs fulfilling the daily duties.

She was described as "elegant in manner, with a beautiful temper and having hosts of friends, as she richly deserved." She appears not have attended court much in practice. She often accompanied her husband on his diplomatic missions (he was minister to Florence), and consequently she did not attend court often, and in fact "passed but little time in her own house". Amélie Carette, who was appointed reader to the empress in 1864, never saw her attend court.

== Legacy ==
She belongs to the ladies-in-waiting depicted with Eugenie in the famous painting Empress Eugénie Surrounded by her Ladies in Waiting by Franz Xaver Winterhalter from 1855.
