= Louise Poitelon du Tarde =

French courtier (1826–1891)

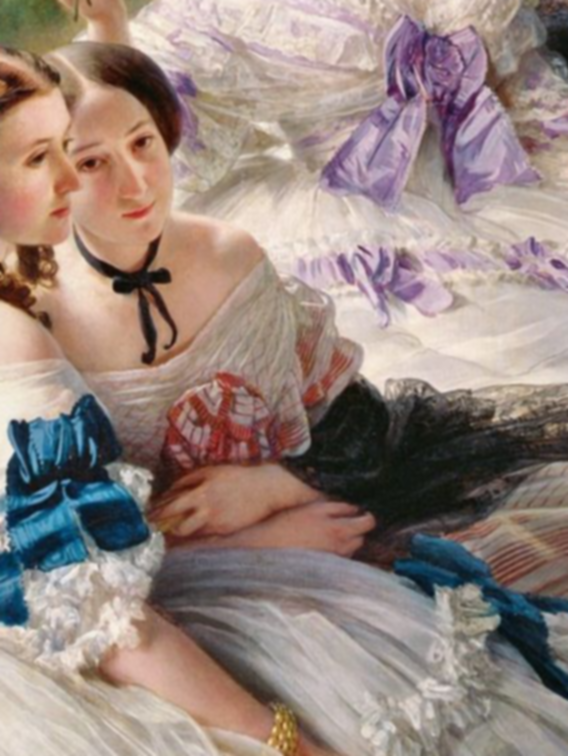
Louise Poitelon du Tarde

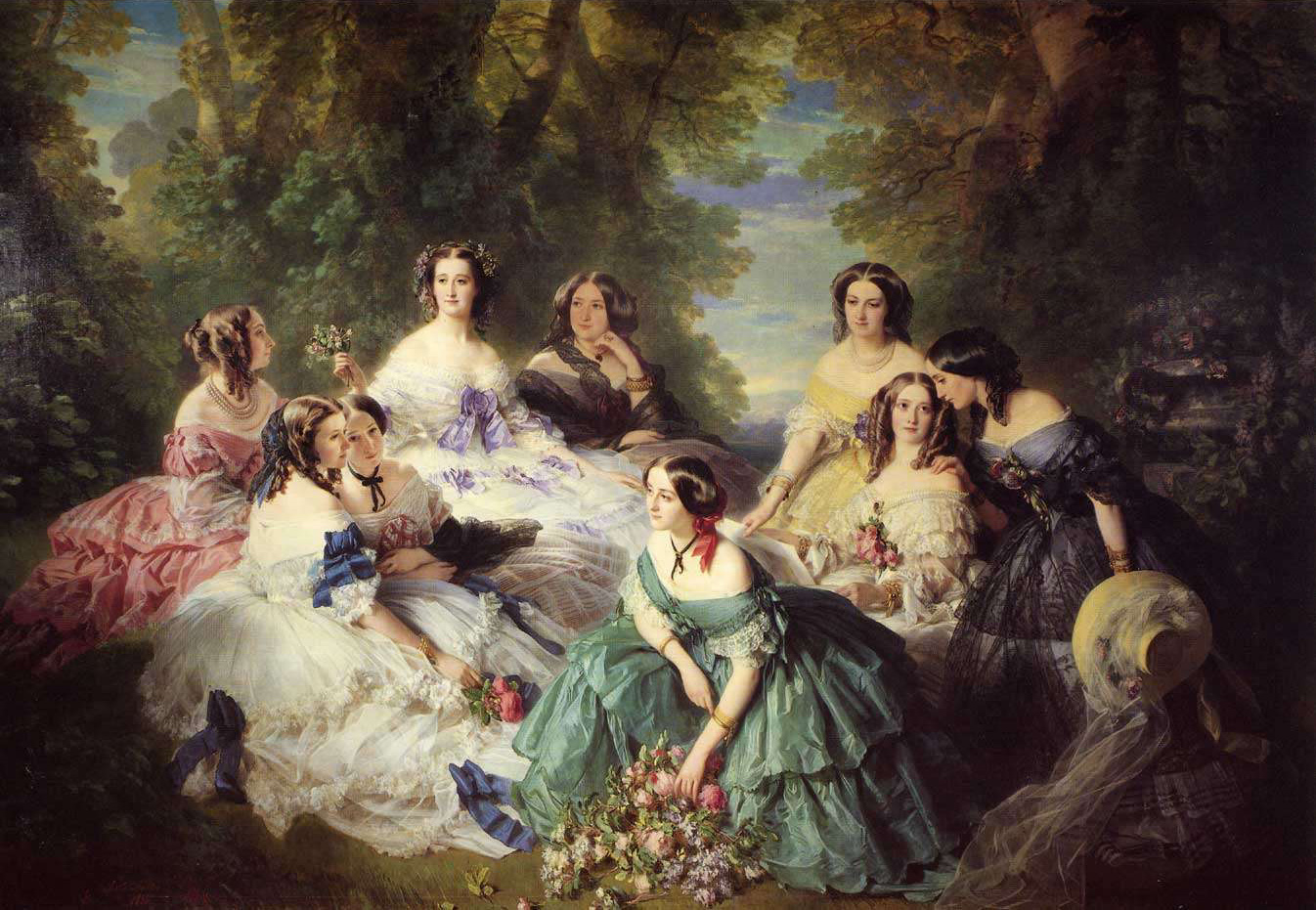
The Empress Eugenie (upper left, with the purple bow) in 1855, surrounded by her ladies in waiting, painted by her favourite artist, Franz Xaver Winterhalter.

Louise Poitelon du Tarde, vicomtesse de Lezay-Marnésia (1826–1891), was a French courtier. She served as lady-in-waiting (dame de Palais) to the empress of France, Eugénie de Montijo.

== Life ==
She was the daughter of Louis Gabriel Poitelon du Tarde and Louise Anne Vétillart du Ribert, and married to Joseph Antoine Albert de Lezay-Marnésia in 1845.

After the introduction of the Second Empire and the marriage of Emperor Napoleon III to Eugénie de Montijo, she was appointed to the Household of the new Empress. The ladies-in-waiting of the new Empress consisted of a Grand-Maitresse or senior lady-in-waiting, the Princesse d'Essling; a Dame d'honneur or deputy, the Duchesse de Bassano, who both attended court on grand functions; and six (later twelve) Dame du Palais, who were selected from among the acquaintances to the Empress prior to her marriage, and who alternated in pairs fulfilling the daily duties. Her husband was appointed chamberlain to the Empress, and served as such until 1869.

She requested to retire for health reasons in 1864, but remained honorary lady-in-waiting. She was by that time described as an invalid. Her place as Dame du Palais was given to Amélie Carette.

== Legacy ==
She belongs to the ladies-in-waiting depicted with Eugenie in the famous painting Empress Eugénie Surrounded by her Ladies in Waiting' by Franz Xaver Winterhalter from 1855.
