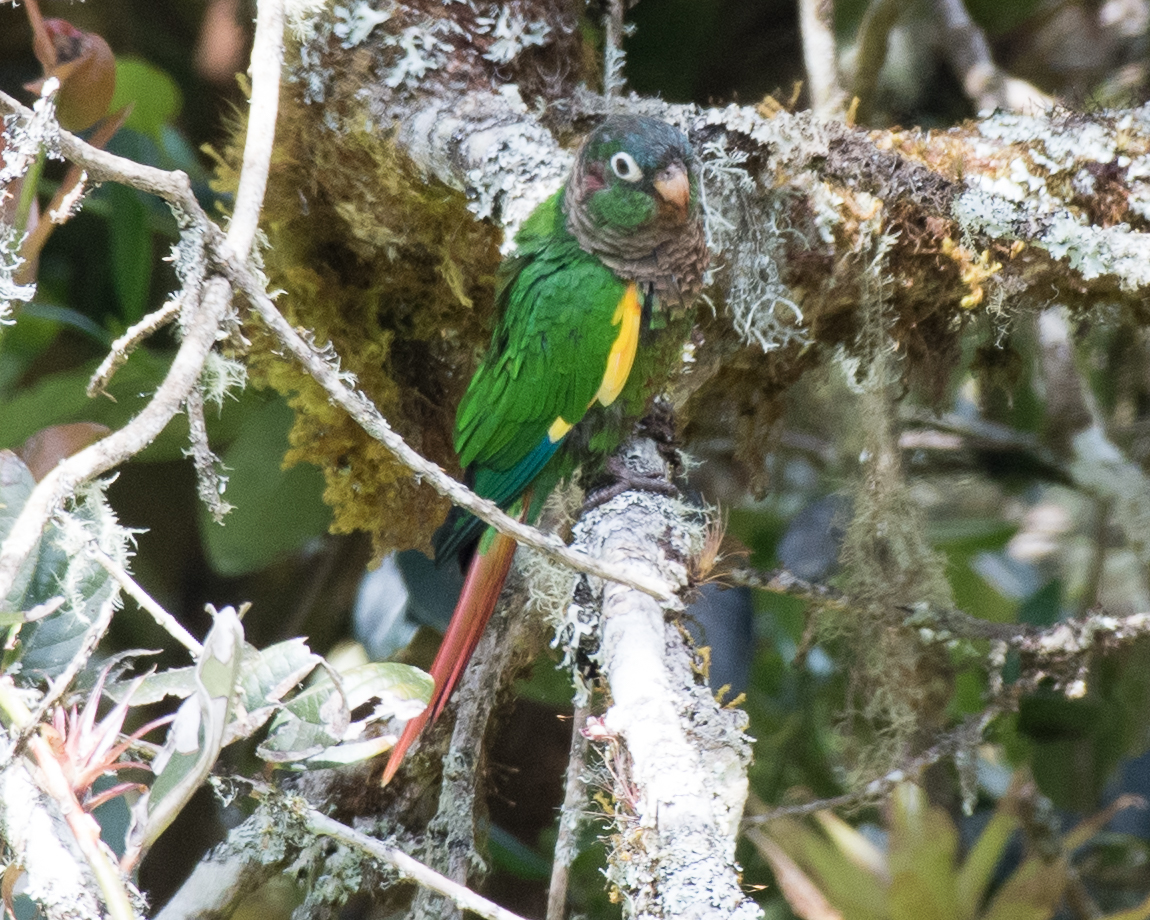

Conservation status
- Vulnerable (IUCN 3.1)

Scientific classification
- Kingdom: Animalia
- Phylum: Chordata
- Class: Aves
- Order: Psittaciformes
- Family: Psittacidae
- Genus: Pyrrhura
- Species: P. calliptera

Binomial name
- Pyrrhura calliptera (Massena & Souancé, 1854)

= Flame-winged parakeet =

Species of bird

The flame-winged parakeet (Pyrrhura calliptera), also known as the brown-breasted parakeet, is a species of parrot in the family Psittacidae. It is endemic to forest edge and shrub at altitudes of 1,700–3,400 m (5,600–11,200 ft) above sea level on the east Andean slope in Colombia. It is threatened by habitat loss.

== Taxonomy and systematics ==
The species was first formally described as Conurus callipterus in 1854 by the French ornithologist Charles de Souancé, after studying a specimen from the collection of his uncle, François Victor Massena, 3rd Duke of Rivoli.

The genus name Pyrrhura is derived from the Ancient Greek purrhos (red) and oura (tail). The species epithet calliptera is also from Ancient Greek: kallos (beauty) and pteros (winged).

The species is monotypic: no subspecies have been identified. The International Ornithologists' Union lists the species as flame-winged parakeet, the other four major taxonomic authorities refer to it as the brown-breasted parakeet.

== Description ==
A medium-sized parakeet, the brown-breasted parakeet measures 22–23 cm in length. The throat and upper breast are medium brown with light edges giving a scalloped appearance. The head of the bird is mostly greyish-brown with green cheeks and contrasting ear coverts that can appear reddish or brown. The eye has a prominent white orbital ring. The breast and belly are reddish brown, often with green shadings. The bird's back and most of its wing coverts are green, with bright yellow primary coverts and bluish primaries. The tail is dull red. In flight bright yellow and orange-red wing markings are evident, which explains the name flame-winged parakeet.

== Distribution and habitat ==
The brown-breasted parakeet is endemic to Colombia. Although its range was originally much larger, it is now only found in fragmented populations on the eastern slope of the Eastern Andes. It is known to be present in the departments of Boyacá, Cundinamarca, and Casanare, and possibly also in Meta, Santander, and Norte de Santander.

The species is found between 1700 and 3400masl in upper subtropical and temperate zone montane forests and forest edges, typically cloud forest, elfin forest, subpáramo and peatbog páramo. Populations are small and highly localized within this habitat.

== Behaviour and ecology ==
=== Breeding ===
It appears that the brown-breasted parakeet uses the strategy of Cooperative breeding, with groups of 4 to 9 birds involved in raising each clutch of chicks. These groups are made up of adult birds and juveniles, with the juveniles providing assistance while learning the skills they will need as adults.

The species uses tree cavities both for overnight roosting areas and for nesting. During the month of September nesting sites are selected, and mating occurs during September and October.

An average of 6.5 eggs are laid in each clutch. The eggs are whitish, measuring 20.9 - 22.1mm wide by 27.8 – 29 mm long. Incubation primarily occurs during October and November. The maturation period, from egg to fledged juvenile, takes 60–70 days and is complete by January of each year.

=== Food and feeding ===
This species feeds on fresh and dried fruit, seeds, and parts of flowers from a wide variety of native plants, including species from the genera Critoniella, Espeletia, Solanaceae, Brunellia, Miconia among others. It is also seen, occasionally in large numbers, feeding on grass leaves and seeds in open areas. Brown-breasted parakeets have reportedly acquired a taste for cultivated maize crops, which brings them into conflict with farmers.

== Status ==
=== Population ===
The most recent study estimates the population of brown-breasted parakeets as between 3300 and 6700 adult birds. The population is fragmented with none of the sub-populations exceeding 1000 birds. The species has been extirpated from its former territories on the western slope of the Eastern Andes. The overall population is declining rapidly and there is no reason to suspect that the rate of decline is levelling off. The species is rated as Vulnerable on the IUCN Red List and the Red Book of the Birds of Colombia (Libro rojo de aves de Colombia).

=== Threats ===
The main threats to the brown-breasted parakeet are habitat loss and habitat fragmentation caused by the encroachment of roads and agriculture into their cloud forest habitat. Pyrrhura parakeets are particularly sensitive to habitat fragmentation, and their unwillingness to move far outside of heavily forested areas means they are prone to geographic and genetic isolation. The species has lost 75% of its historical habitat, and 14.4% of that loss occurred during the period 2000–2010. With the population of Colombia growing and the significant reduction in guerilla activity in the Andean highlands this downward trend is not expected to change in the future.

Additional threats are more difficult to quantify, but is known that these birds are persecuted as agricultural pests because they feed on cultivated maize fields. The species is not affected by the international trade in wild birds but a small number are captured as household pets.

=== Conservation efforts ===
Conservation activities on behalf of this species have been undertaken by several organizations, including the national parks system (SPNN: Sistema de Parques Nacionales Naturales), environmental authorities at the regional level (CAR: Corporaciones Autónomas Regionales), environmental NGOs and community groups, though there does not seem to be a coordinated plan in effect.

Some ecological restoration activities are being led by the Aqueduct and Sewerage Company of Bogotá, the Chingaza National Natural Park in Cundinamarca, and the Sierra Nevada del Cocuy National Park in Boyacá. In the latter, a biological corridor has been designed that not only includes the extension of the park itself, but also its buffer zones.

Fundación ProAves, the main Colombian NGO aimed at bird conservation, under the aegis of the Pyrrhura Project, has been doing population estimates and reproductive monitoring in the area of the Chingaza National Natural Park since 2004. These studies are a necessary precursor to a comprehensive action plan.

An Artificial Nests Program in the village of Mundo Nuevo, municipality of La Calera, has installed 48 artificial nest cavities in an attempt to reduce the impact of habitat loss. Brown-breasted parakeets have proven willing to nest in these cavities.

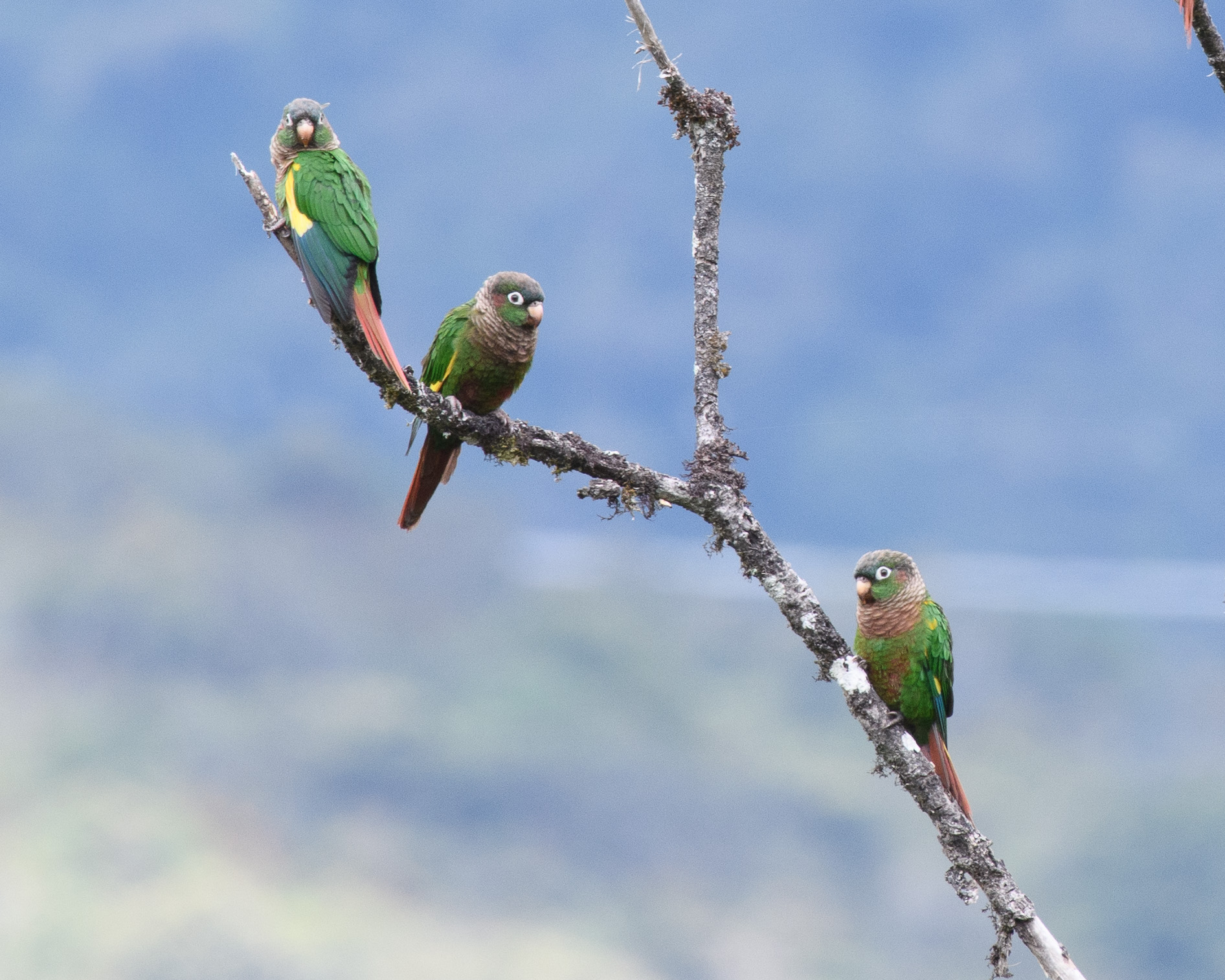
Brown-breasted Parakeet / Flame-winged Parakeet (Pyrrhura calliptera)

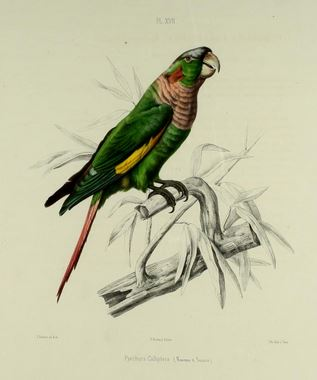
