= Jane Thorne =

Jane Mary Thorne
- Baronne de Pierres
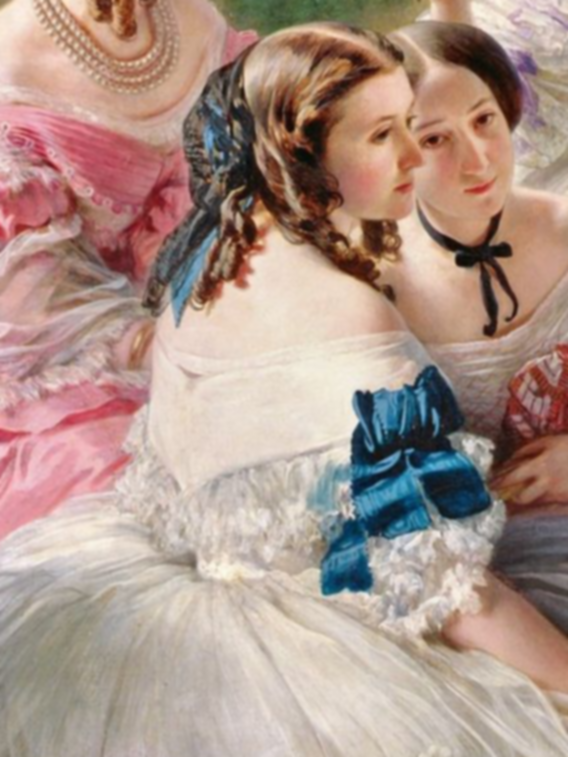
- Born: 1821; New York City
- Died: 7 February 1873 (aged 51–52)
- Spouses: Eugène Stéphane de Pierres, baron de Pierres
- Father: Colonel Herman Thorne
- Mother: Jane Mary Jauncey
- Occupation: Dame du Palais to Empress Eugénie de Montijo

Jane Mary Thorne, baronne de Pierres (1821–1873) was a French courtier of American origin. She served as lady-in-waiting (dame de Palais) to the empress of France, Eugénie de Montijo.

== Life ==
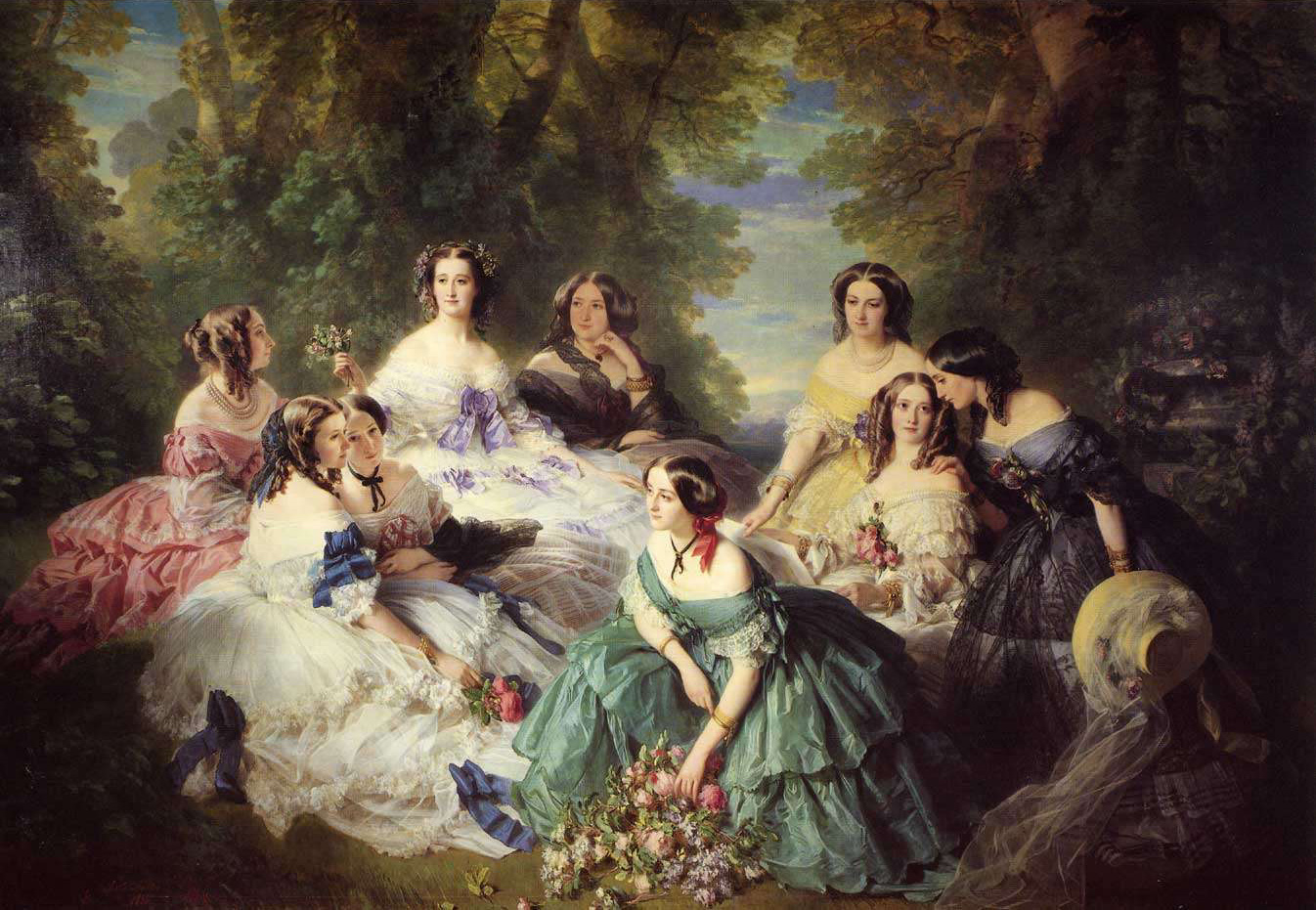
The Empress Eugenie (upper left, with the purple bow) in 1855, surrounded by her ladies in waiting, painted by her favourite artist, Franz Xaver Winterhalter.

Jane Thorne was born in New York as the daughter of the American millionaire Colonel Herman Thorne and Jane Mary Jauncey. Her father was a well known figure in the American millionaire colony in Paris during the reign of Louis Philippe I. She married the French nobleman Eugène Stéphane de Pierres, baron de Pierres, on 7 June 1842 They had three children Henri Stephane (Captain of the 7th Dragoons), Herman Fortune, and Jeanne Marie. Her two sisters, Mary and Alice, married respectively French aristocrats Baron Camille de Varaigne (on 28 March 1832) and Count Amédée d'Audebert de Férussac (on 27 August 1845).

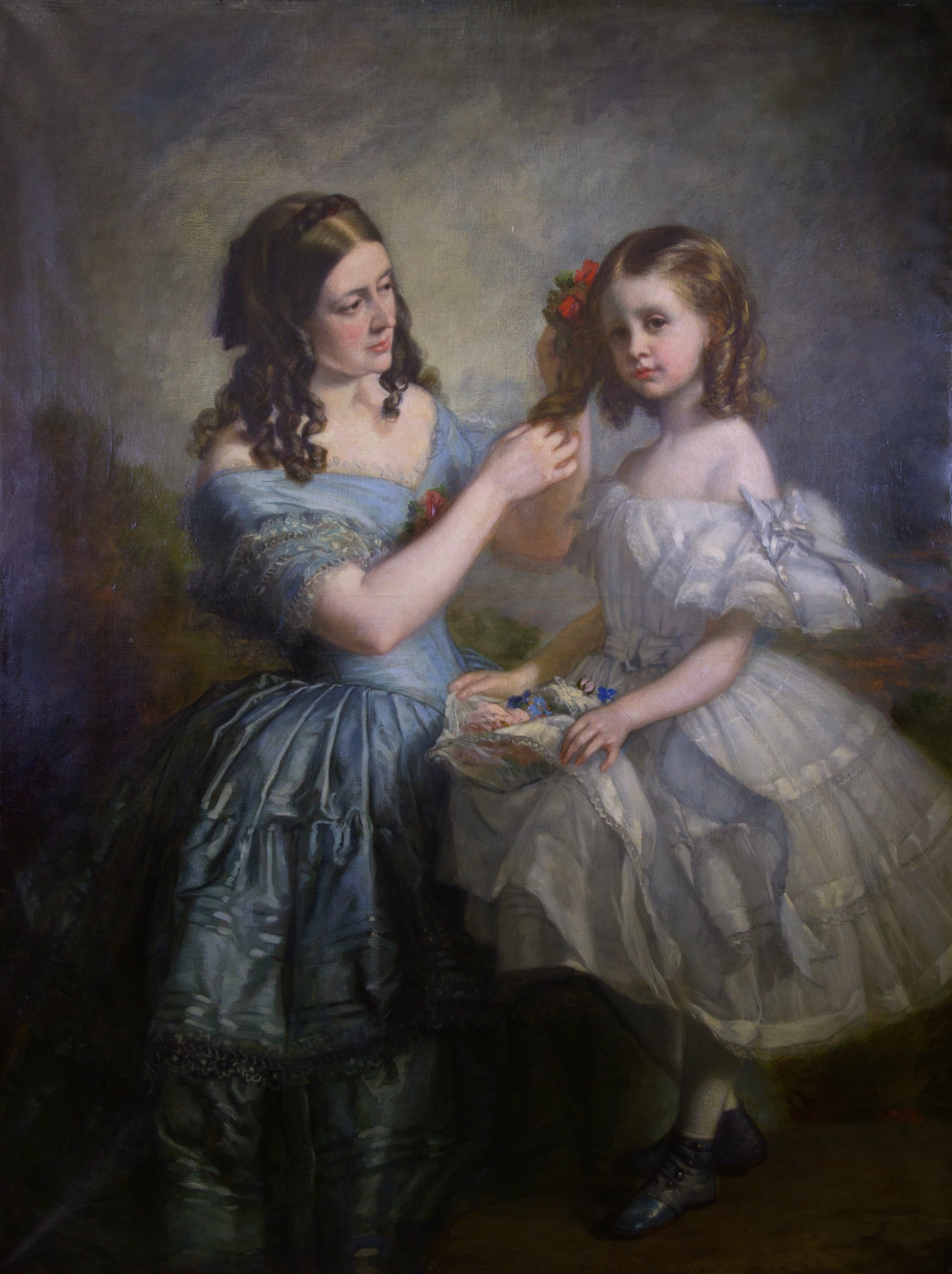
Baroness de Pierres and her daughter Jeanne Marie, oil on canvas by Healy, 1855, Chicago, Newberry Library.

After the introduction of the Second Empire and the marriage of Emperor Napoleon III to Eugénie de Montijo, she was appointed to the Household of the new Empress. The ladies-in-waiting of the new Empress consisted of a Grand-Maitresse or senior lady-in-waiting, the Princesse d'Essling; a Dame d'honneur or deputy, the Duchesse de Bassano, who both attended court on grand functions; and six (later twelve) Dame du Palais, who were selected from among the acquaintances to the Empress prior to her marriage, and who alternated in pairs fulfilling the daily duties. Her husband was appointed equerry to the Empress. Both she and her spouse kept their positions from 1853 to 1870.

Jane Thorne was a personal friend of Eugenie from before her marriage to the emperor. She was referred to as a great beauty, but also as a shy, introverted neurotic.

The empress was reportedly charmed by her American accent, but also irritated by her smoking, as she had the habit of blowing the smoke in to the empress' face. Empress Eugenie often spoke English with Jane Thorne, because she wanted to keep up her English. A contemporary said of her:

"Miss Thorne spoke English with just a slight touch of the best American accent and some of the words which she had brought with her from the other side of the Atlantic — especially that picturesque American slang, which she sometimes employed with much effect in her lively conversation — had a special charm for the Empress [...] I think it was largely due to this fascinating American woman that her fellow countrymen and women always had such a warm welcome at the Court of the Tuileries."

Jane Thorne was described as an excellent rider, and often accompanied the empress during riding or hunting, along with her husband, the equerry. A contemporary described her:

"She was the finest horsewoman, and yet the most timid person I ever knew; the least trifle terrified her. She had been very pretty and was exceedingly sweet and amiable."

== Legacy ==
She belongs to the ladies-in-waiting depicted with Eugenie in the famous painting Empress Eugénie Surrounded by her Ladies in Waiting by Franz Xaver Winterhalter from 1855.
