= Anne Eve Mortier de Trévise =

French courtier (1829–1900)

- Marquise de Latour-Maubourg
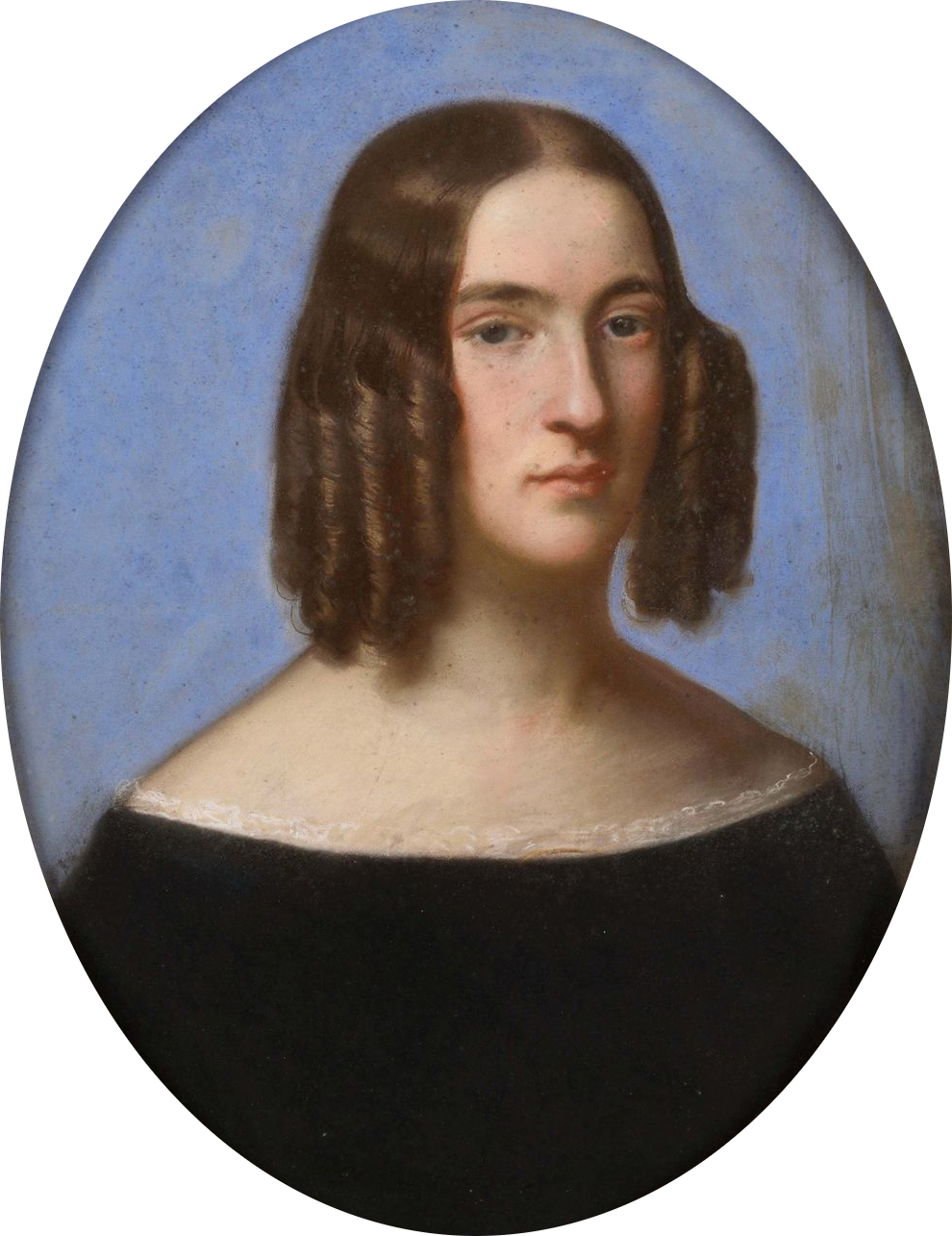
- Born: 1829
- Died: 1900 (aged 70–71)
- Spouses: César Florimond de Faÿ, marquis de La Tour-Maubourg
- Father: Napoléon Mortier, II. duc de Trévise
- Mother: Anne-Marie Lecomte-Stuart
- Occupation: Dame du Palais to Eugénie de Montijo

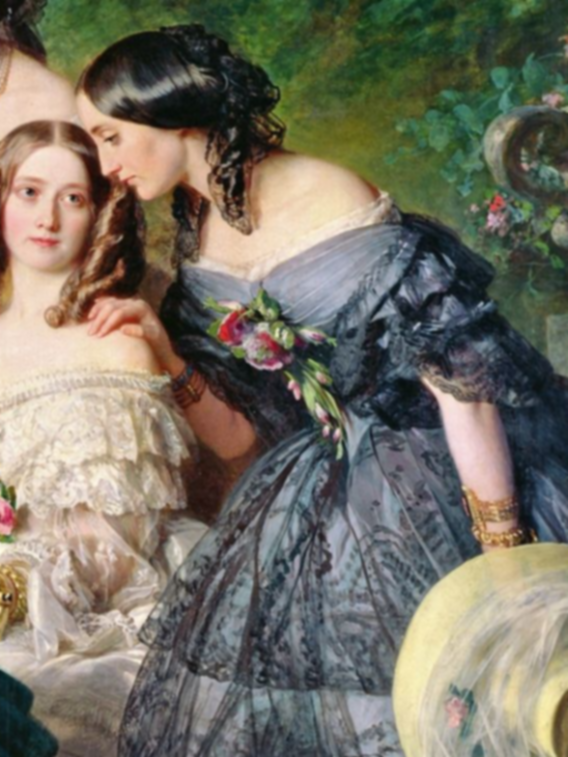
Anne Eve Mortier de Trévise

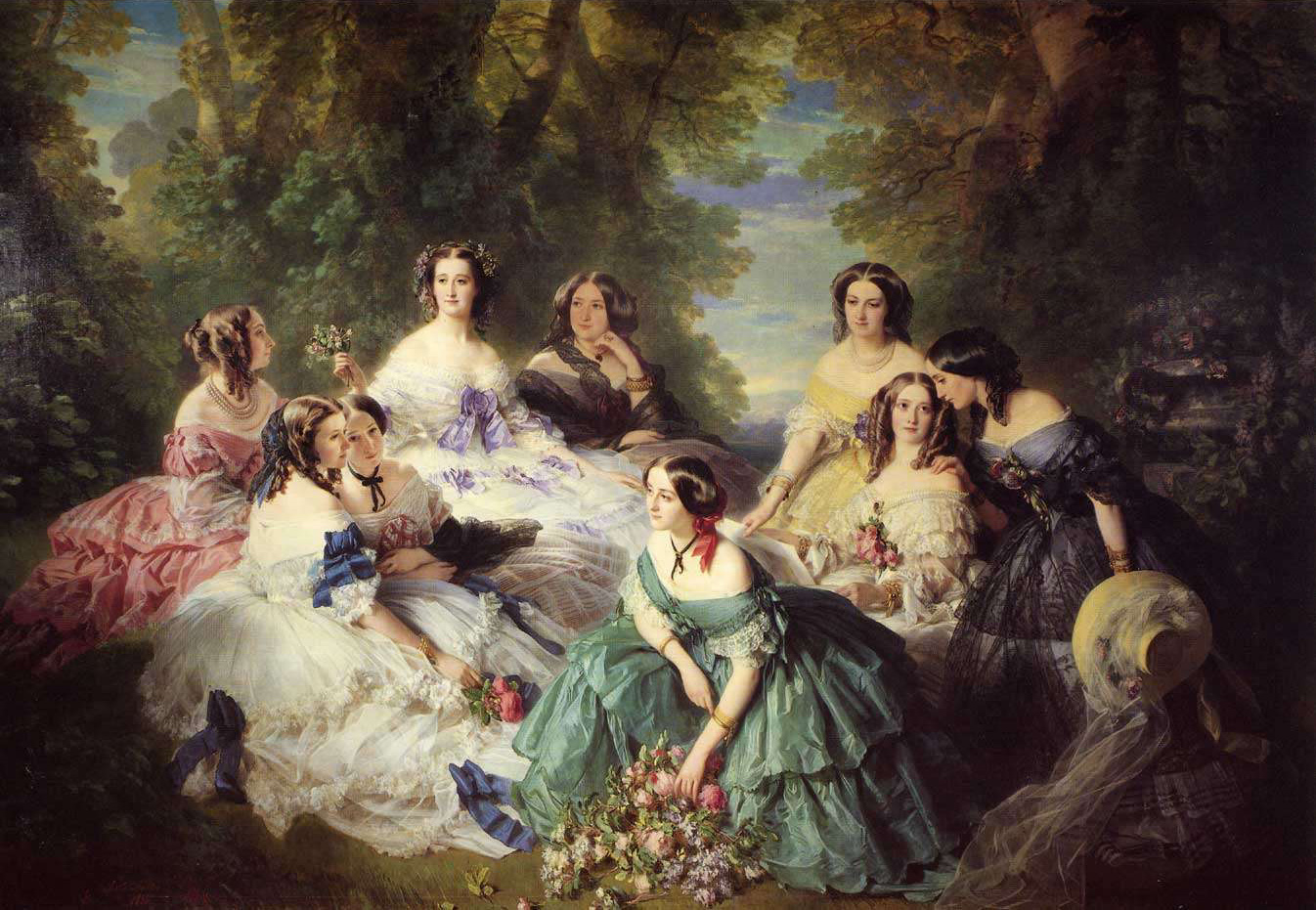
The Empress Eugenie (upper left, with the purple bow) in 1855, surrounded by her ladies in waiting, painted by her favourite artist, Franz Xaver Winterhalter.

Anne Mortier de Trévise, marquise de Latour-Maubourg (1829-1900), was a French courtier. She served as lady-in-waiting (dame de Palais) to the empress of France, Eugénie de Montijo.

== Life ==
She was the daughter of Napoléon Mortier, II. duc de Trévise and Anne-Marie Lecomte-Stuart, and married César Florimond de Faÿ, marquis de La Tour-Maubourg in 1849. After the introduction of the Second Empire and the marriage of Emperor Napoleon III to Eugénie de Montijo, she was appointed to the Household of the new Empress. The ladies-in-waiting of the new Empress consisted of a Grand-Maitresse or senior lady-in-waiting, the Princesse d'Essling; a Dame d'honneur or deputy, the Duchesse de Bassano, who both attended court on grand functions; and six (later twelve) Dame du Palais, who were selected from among the acquaintances to the Empress prior to her marriage, and who alternated in pairs fulfilling the daily duties. She kept her position from 1853 to 1870.

She was described by a contemporary as a "most interesting and amiable woman", who lived in a very happy marriage. Her open adoration of her spouse made people tease her somewhat, and when she was at one occasion asked what she would do if her husband should be unfaithful, she replied: "I should be so astonished, I should die of sheer surprise." Empress Eugenie often selected her to accompany her on her travels and journeys and preferred her as a travelling companion.

Her domestic happiness and economic security had made her life so sheltered, that when she was one day told of the mortal illness of her father, she exclaimed: "It is the first trouble of my life. God knows what may now come to me!"

Her parents both died shortly before the outbreak of the Franco-Prussian war, followed by her son, who died in battle, and her daughter, who died in childbirth shortly after the peace. This succession of blows caused her husband a deep depression, and she devoted herself to nursing him. By the time of his death, she was described as deeply pious, and reportedly wished to enter a convent.

== Legacy ==
She belongs to the ladies-in-waiting depicted with Eugenie in the famous painting Empress Eugénie Surrounded by her Ladies in Waiting by Franz Xaver Winterhalter from 1855.
