= Elizabeth Train =

Elizabeth Train may refer to:

- Elizabeth L. Train, United States Navy admiral
- Elizabeth Phipps Train, American novelist and translator
