= Empress Eugénie Surrounded by her Ladies in Waiting =

1855 painting by Franz Xaver Winterhalter

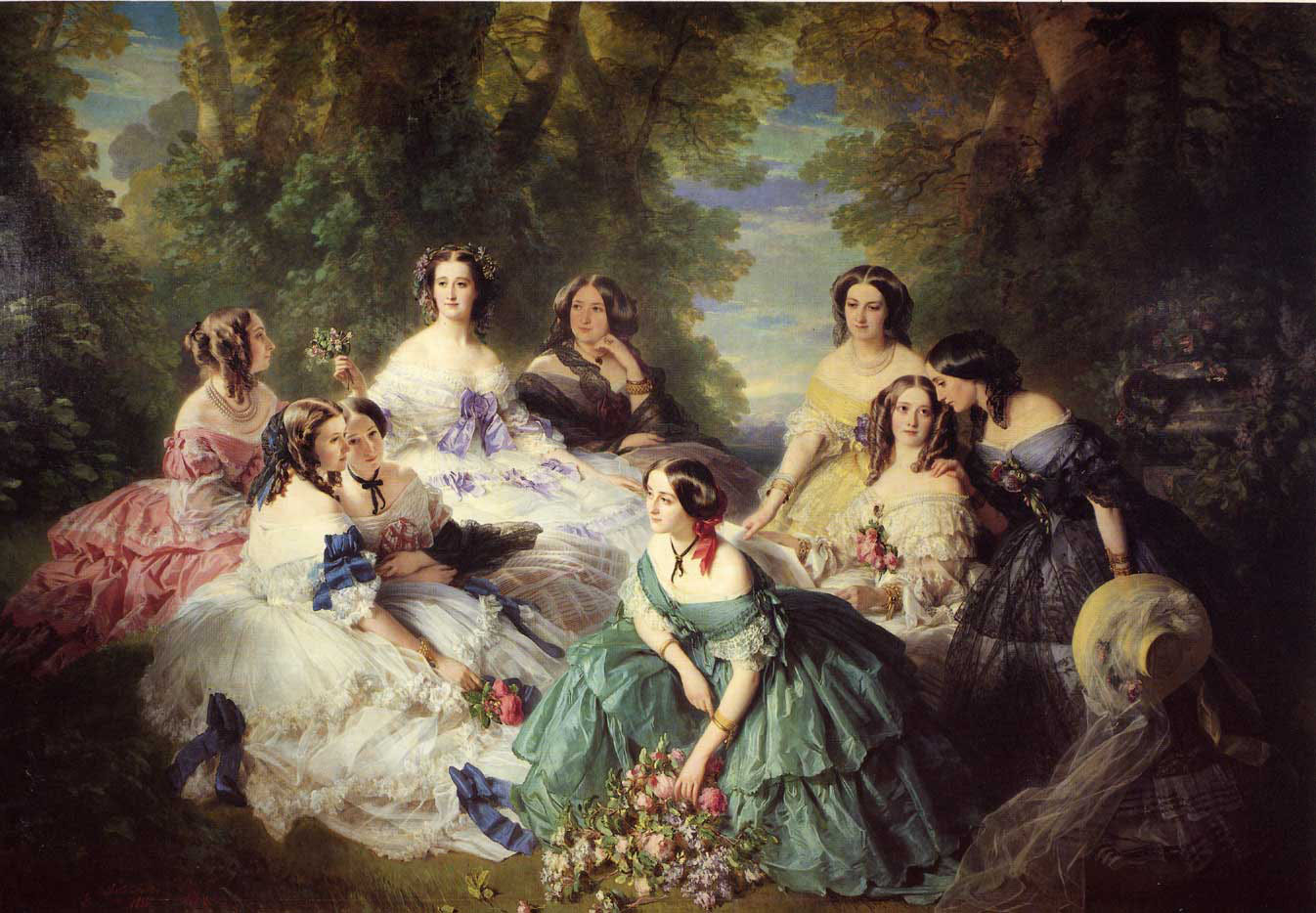
- Artist: Franz Xaver Winterhalter
- Year: 1855
- Medium: Oil on canvas
- Dimensions: 300 cm × 420 cm (120 in × 170 in)
- Location: Château de Compiègne, Compiègne

Empress Eugénie Surrounded by her Ladies in Waiting is an oil on canvas painting by the German artist Franz Xaver Winterhalter completed in 1855. It features depictions of the Empress of France, Eugénie de Montijo, and eight of her ladies-in-waiting. The painting was displayed at the Palace of Fontainebleau during the regime of Eugénie's husband, Napoleon III. After Eugénie's exile to England, the painting was given to her, and later displayed in the entrance to her house at Farnborough Hill. It is currently on display at the Château de Compiègne.

== History ==
The painting was commissioned by Empress Eugénie de Montijo to be exhibited at the painting salon of the Exposition Universelle, which opened in May. The painting was supposed to represent the sovereign in the midst of her ladies-in-waiting, who took turns around her throughout the week. They are in the number of ten when the first sketch was made by the painter. However, the seventh lady, Léonie Bugeaud de la Piconnerie d'Isly, Comtesse de Feray, resigned in January 1855, which forced the painter to completely rethink the composition of the painting in few weeks. He managed to complete it in four months with the help of his studio to be ready for the opening of the exhibition.

The reception of the painting was mixed. The Parisian critics did not fail to underline the sloppy aspect of the painting and reproached him for having been apparently more interested in the details of the dresses than in the personality of her characters. On the other hand, it was met with great success by the general public as well as by the circles of the imperial court, with the painting seen as symbolizing the splendor of the new regime. It was then exhibited at the Kunstverein in Vienna in 1856. Widely distributed in the form of prints, it became a symbol of the Second Empire.

== Description ==
The scene, bathed in a cold, bright light, depicts Eugénie de Montijo, Empress of the French for seventeen years, surrounded by eight ladies-in-waiting in a fictional country setting. She is represented with a crown of honeysuckle on her head and a branch of the same plant in her hand, acting as a scepter. She slightly dominates the other characters. She is facing the Grand Mistress of her household, on her right, Anne Debelle, Princess of Essling (1802–1887), wife of François Victor Massena, 3rd Duke of Rivoli. To her left stands her lady-in-waiting, Pauline van der Linden d'Hooghvorst, Duchess of Bassano (1814–1867), wife of Napoléon Maret. Below are the ladies of the palace, who followed the empress daily: on the left, Jane Thorne, baroness of Pierres (1821–1873), wife of Stéphane de Pierres and Louise Poitelon du Tarde, viscountess of Lezay-Marnésia (1826–1891), wife of Joseph-Antoine-Albert de Lezay-Marnesia; in the center, Adrienne de Villeneuve-Bargemont, countess of Montebello (1826–1870), wife of Gustave Olivier Lannes de Montebello, and on the right, Anne Eve Mortier de Trévise, marquise of Latour-Maubourg (1829–1900), wife of César de Faÿ de La Tour-Maubourg, Claire Emilie MacDonnel, Marquise de Las Marismas de Guadalquivir (1817–1905), wife of Alexandre Aguado Moreno, and behind them, standing, Nathalie de Ségur, Baroness of Malaret (1827–1910), wife of Paul Martin d'Ayguesvives, and daughter of the Countess of Ségur).

The composition, incorporating many characters, recalls other paintings by Winterhalter, like The Decameron (1837), one of the painter's first successes. In these two paintings, the landscape forms a simple decor placed behind the characters, as on a theater stage. It was also quickly executed and still contains drips. The characters give the impression of being arranged on an inclined plane to justify the protocol order. The costumes, on the other hand, are much more detailed, with crinolines, ruffles and ruches in bright colors. A rumor has retrospectively suggested that the models present in this painting had also served as models in another work by Winterhalter, a little earlier, Florinda (Royal Collection, 1852), which uses the same composition. This comparison did not fail to cause scandal because the women are represented naked in this last work.

In addition to the sketch already mentioned, a drawing and a small autograph canvas made the same year are kept in private collections.

== Gallery ==
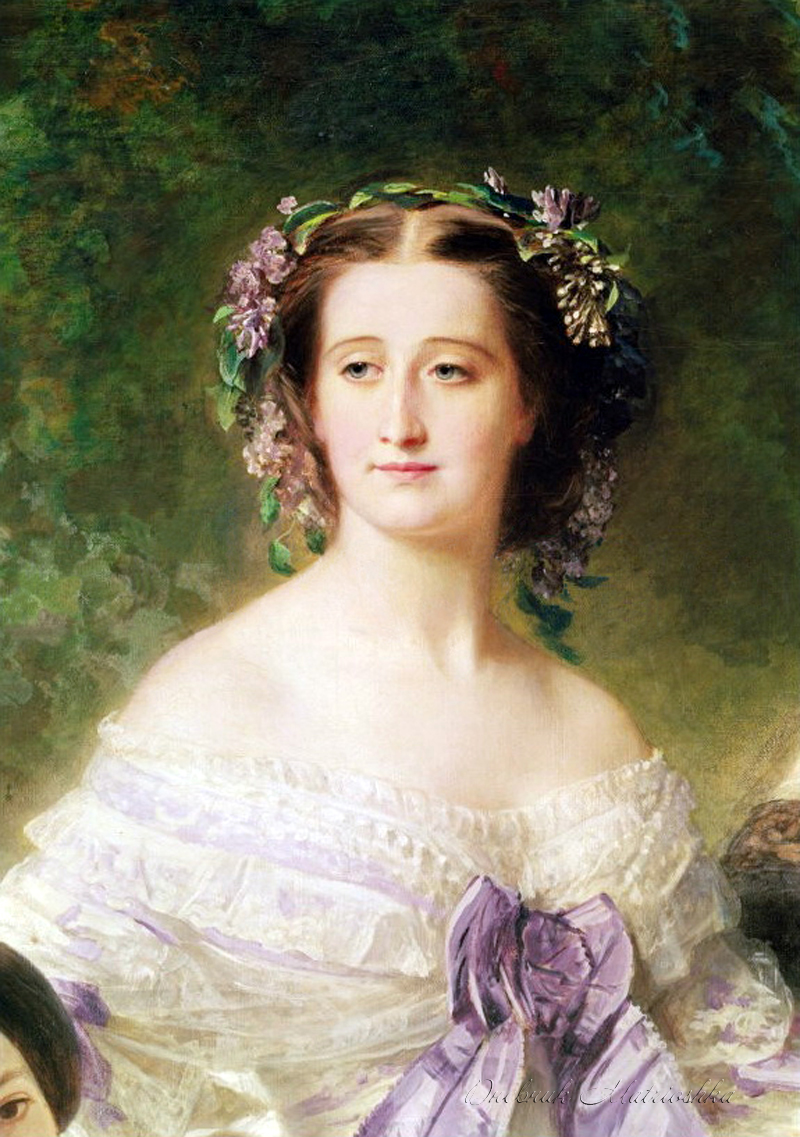
Eugénie de Montijo

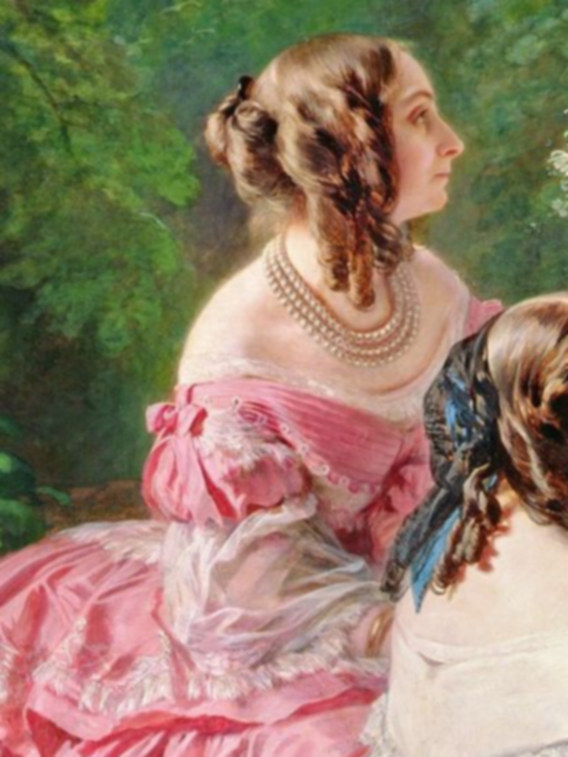
Anne d'Essling

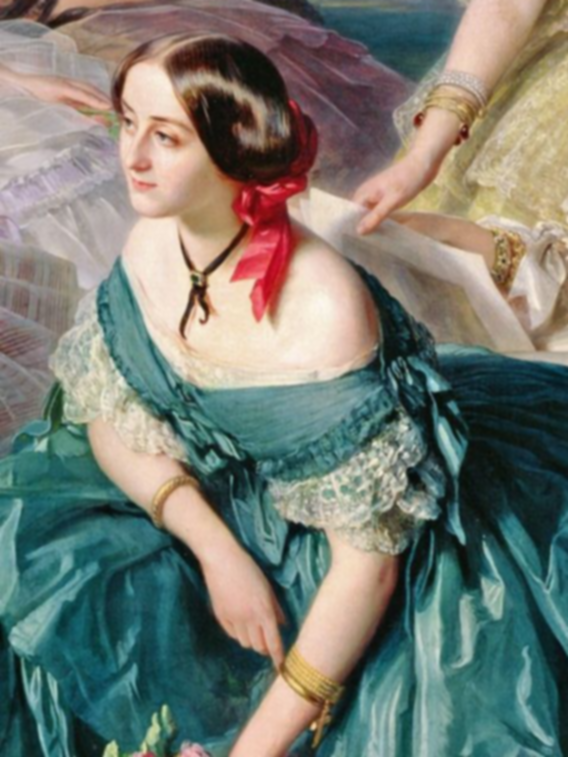
Adrienne de Villeneuve-Bargemont

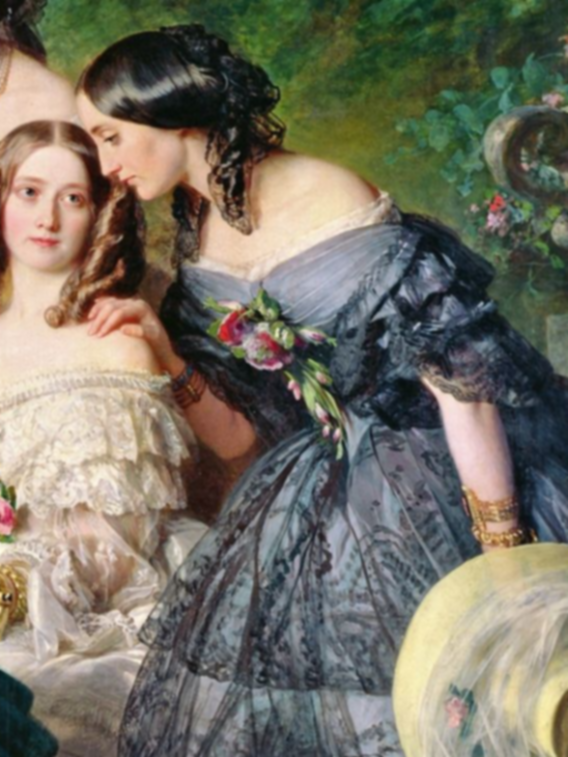
Anne Eve Mortier de Trévise

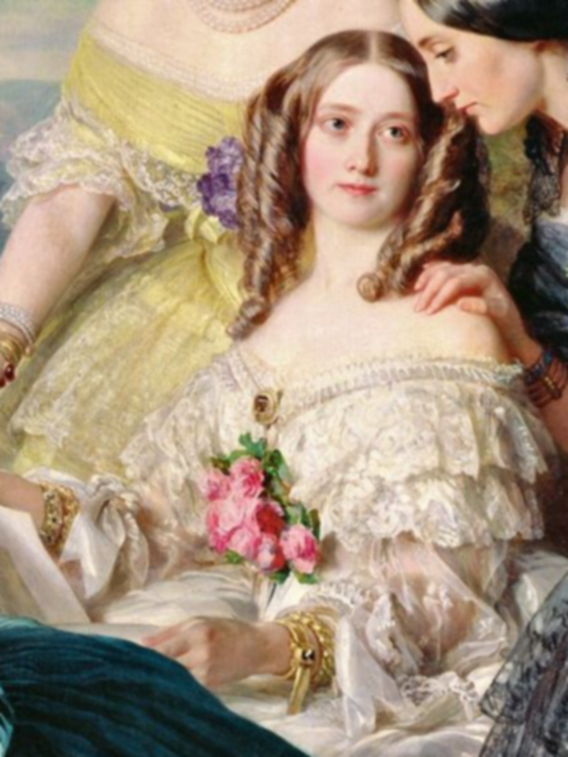
Claire Emilie MacDonnel

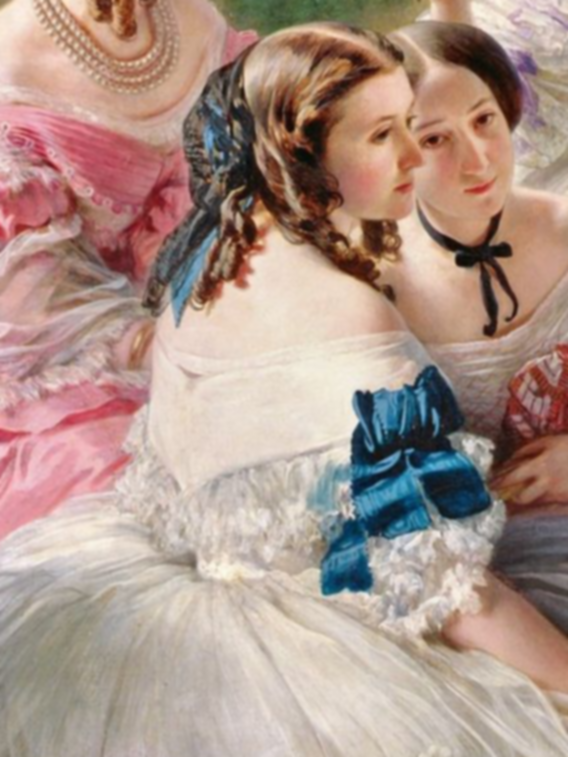
Jane Thorne

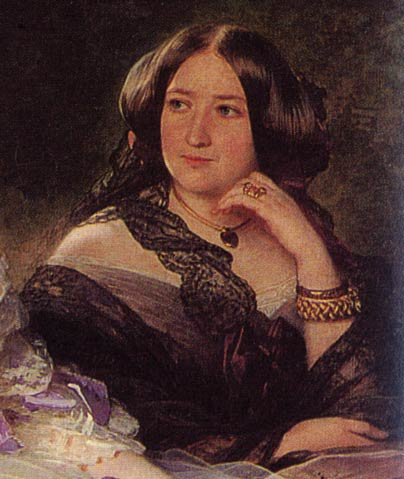
Pauline de Bassano

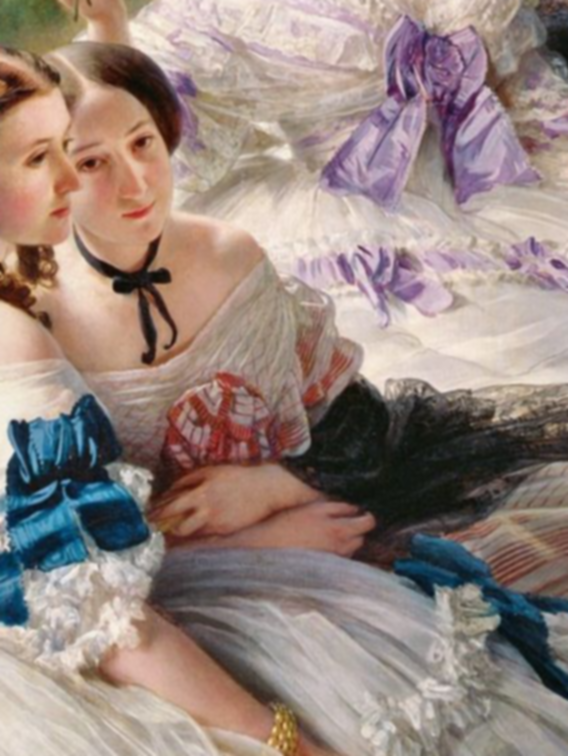
Louise Poitelon du Tarde

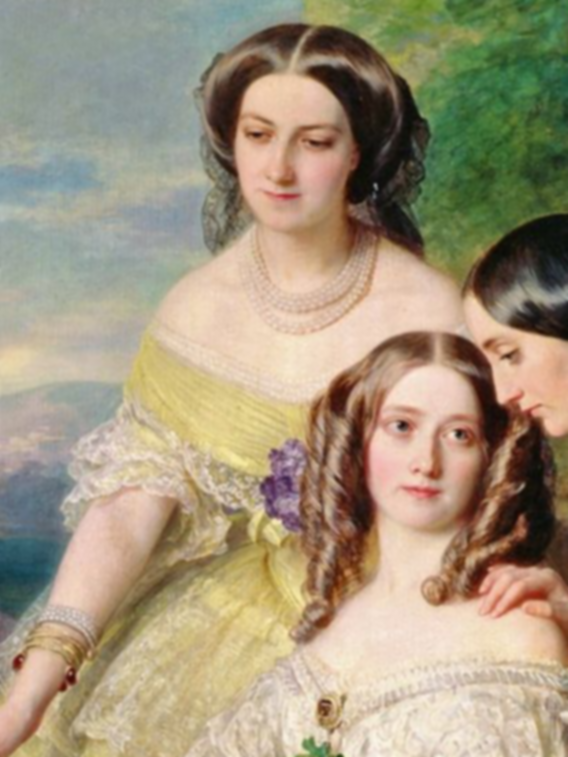
Nathalie de Ségur
