= Massena (disambiguation) =

Massena may refer to:

- André Masséna, French-Italian military commander during the Revolutionary and Napoleonic Wars
- Massena, the post-2025 campus of Simon's Rock at Bard College, named after the commander
- François Victor Massena, 3rd Duke of Rivoli, French nobleman and ornithologist, son of André Masséna
- French battleship Masséna, a French pre-dreadnought battleship, named after the commander
- Massena, New York, a town in New York, United States, named after the commander
- Massena (village), New York, partly located in the Town of Massena
- Massena, Iowa, a city in Iowa, United States, named after Massena, New York
- Alternative transliteration of Masinissa (c. 240 or 238-c. 148 BC), ancient Numidian king
