= Elizabeth Phipps Train =

American novelist

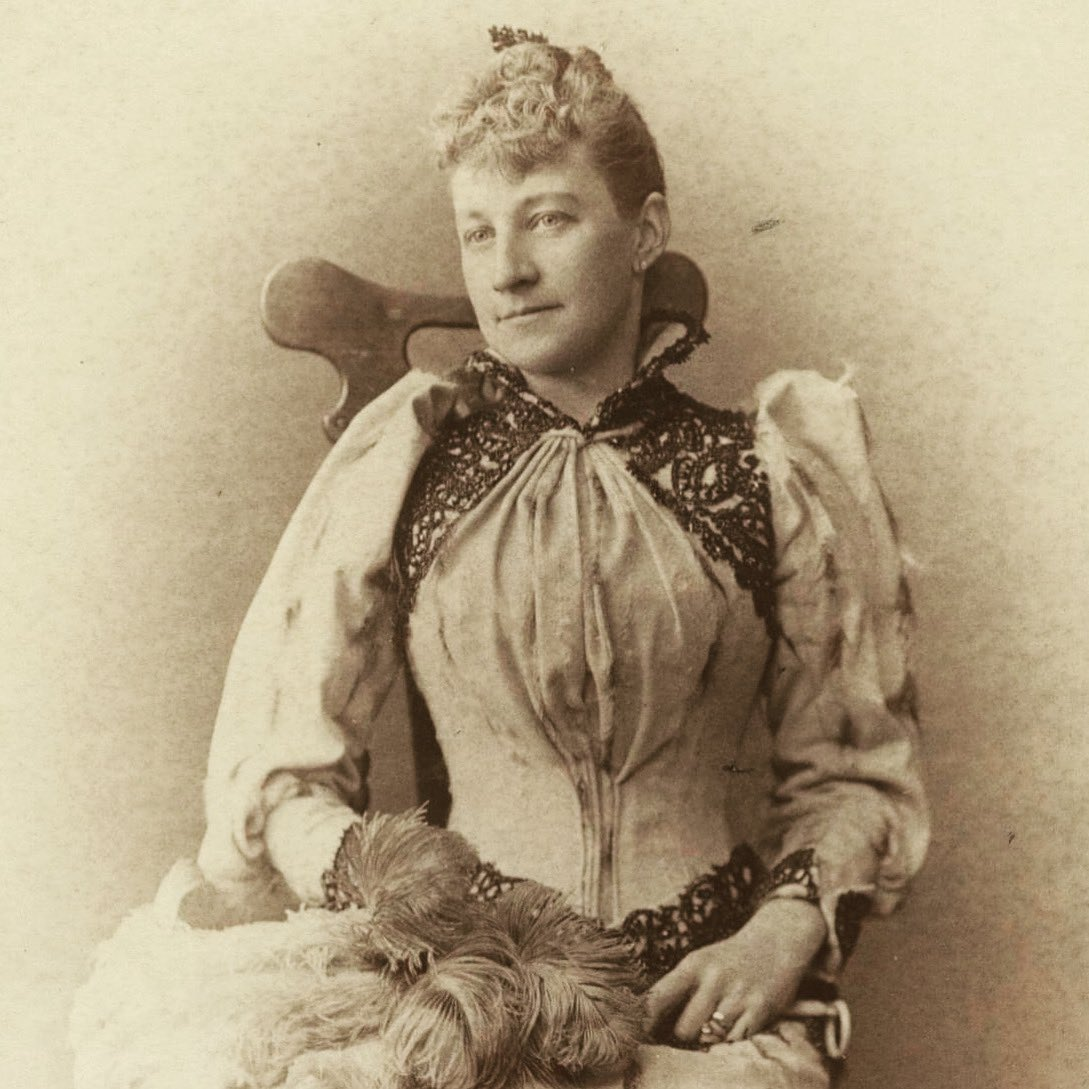
- Elizabeth Phipps Train
- Born: September 1, 1856; Boston, Massachusetts, United States
- Died: July 16, 1940 (aged 83); Brookline, Massachusetts, United States
- Occupations: novelist, translator

Elizabeth Phipps Train (September 1, 1856 – July 16, 1940) was an American novelist, short-story writer, and translator. Active primarily during the 1890s, she wrote several novels and translated works by French authors including Jules Mary, Ernest Daudet, and Amélie Carette. Her best-known novel, A Social Highwayman (1896), first appeared in Lippincott's Monthly Magazine and was subsequently adapted for the stage.

== Early life and education ==
Elizabeth Phipps Train was born on September 1, 1856, in the Dorchester neighborhood of Boston, to William G. Train and Mary Elizabeth Phipps Train. She later moved to Roxbury, where she attended public schools from 1866 to 1870, before studying at Wells College in Aurora, New York, from 1870 to 1872.

== Career ==
Train published a number of translations from the French, as well as original novels. She began her career with an English translation of The Shadow of Roger Laroque (1890) by Jules Mary.

Her most well-known work, A Social Highwayman (1896), originally appeared in the July 1895 issue of Lippincott's Monthly Magazine. According to the Daily True American, the issue sold out following the story's publication due to its populariy. A Social Highwayman follows the rise and fall of Courtice Jaffrey, a socialite turned jewel thief. His story is narrated by his valet Jenkins Hanby.

In 1895, Mary T. Stone adapted the story for the stage; the play opened at New York's Garrick Theatre on September 24, 1895. The Philadelphia Record noted the play’s success in New York and that it had also earned Philadelphia’s approval. The Daily True American's review of the play praised its skillful plot.

Train's next novel was A Marital Liability (1897). A reviewer for the Boston Evening Transcript criticized the novel’s treatment of social hierarchy and its melodramatic plot, which follows Mr. Van Vorst, a New York aristocrat recently released from prison. However, she subsequently published two more novels, A Queen of Hearts, A Deserter from Philistia, and Madam of the Ivies.

Train continued to publish short stories and a final translation from the French, Recollections of the Court of the Tuileries by Amélie Carette (1899). Three of Train's works were featured in the 1900 edition of Short Story Masterpieces by the Best American Authors: "Easter Day", "Debtors to Chance", and "A Held-up Ball Gown".

Train lived in Boston and Duxbury, Massachusetts. She died on July 16, 1940 in Brookline, Massachusetts, after a long illness.

== Bibliography ==
=== Novels ===
- Doctor Lamar (New York: Thomas Y. Crowell & Co., 1891)
- The Autobiography of a Professional Beauty (Philadelphia, J.B. Lippincott Company, 1896)
- A Social Highwayman (Philadelphia: J.B. Lippincott Company, 1896)
- A Marital Liability (Philadelphia: J.B. Lippincott Company, 1897), illustrated by Violet Oakley
- A Queen of Hearts (Philadelphia: J.B. Lippincott Company, 1898, c1897)
- A Deserter from Philistia: A Tale (1897)
- Madam of the Ivies (Philadelphia: J.B. Lippincott Company, c1898)

=== Translations from the French ===
- The Shadow of Roger Laroque by Jules Mary (1890)
- The Apostate: A Novel by Ernest Daudet (New York, D. Appleton and Company, 1893)
- Recollections of the Court of the Tuileries by Amélie Carette (1899)
