= Thomas Bellerby Wilson =

American naturalist (1807-1865)

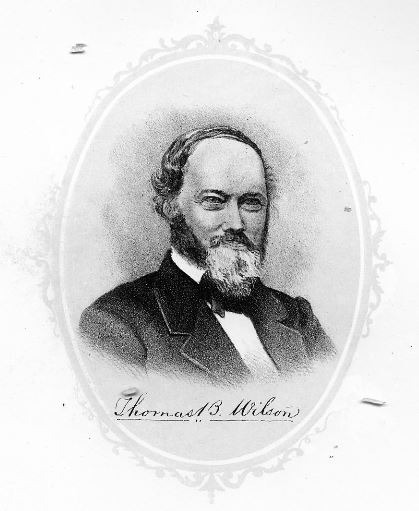
Thomas Bellerby Wilson (1807–1865)

Thomas Bellerby Wilson (1807–1865) was an American naturalist. Wilson was born in Philadelphia, Pennsylvania and educated first at a Quaker school there, then in Darlington, England, and then at the University of Paris, France and Trinity College in Ireland. In 1828, he entered the University of Pennsylvania training as a physician. He lived in Philadelphia until 1833, then moved to New London, Pennsylvania. In 1841, he moved to Newark, Delaware. He joined the Academy of Natural Sciences of Philadelphia and was their principal benefactor and donor. His 26,000 specimens bird collection was housed in the academy building, which was enlarged for the purpose of its display.

Wilson made many field trips in the US to collect birds, reptiles, fish and insects, minerals, fossils and shells . He also purchased entire collections of specimens and libraries by mail and during his five trips to Europe. One such collection was that of François Victor Masséna (12,500 bird specimens).

Wilson was one of the founders of the American Entomological Society
