= Christine-Zoë de Montjoye =

French courtier (1779–1849)

Christine-Zoë de Tuillière-Montjoye, Marquise de Dolomieu (1779–1849) was a French courtier. She was the Première dame d'honneur of the French queen Maria Amalia of Naples and Sicily.

She was the daughter of comte Gustave de Montjoye; she married Alphonse de Gratet, marquis de Dolomieu. Her father was a personal friend of Louis Philippe I, and had followed him into exile during the French Revolution.

She was appointed dame pour accompagner (lady-in-waiting) of Maria Amalia, the duchess of Orléans. When Maria Amalia became queen in 1830, Montjoye served as the senior lady-in-waiting of the queen. She was the personal friend and confidante of the queen and was able to exert some influence; the diplomat attributed the start of his diplomatic career to her support.

She accompanied Maria Amalia into exile to England after the French Revolution of 1848, and her presence was noted in Claremont when Queen Victoria visited the former king and queen there on their first meeting after the revolution.

== See also ==
- Isabella Charlotte de Rohan-Chabot

Court offices
Preceded by Louise Antoinette de Montebello	Première dame d'honneur 1830–1848	Succeeded by Pauline de Bassano
