= Sambre-et-Meuse =

Former French department

Department of Sambre-et-Meuse Département de Sambre-et-Meuse (French)
- 1795–1814
- Location of Sambre-et-Meuse in France (1812)
- Status: Department of the French First Republic and the French First Empire
- Chef-lieu: Namur; 50°28′N 4°52′E
- Official languages: French
- History
  - Creation: 1 October 1795
  - Treaty of Paris, disestablished: 30 May 1814

Population
  - 1814: 180,655
Preceded by	Succeeded by
Austrian Netherlands; Prince-Bishopric of Liège	Province of Namur
- Today part of: Belgium

Sambre-et-Meuse (French: [sɑ̃bʁ e møz]) was a department of the French First Republic and French First Empire in present-day Belgium. It was named after the rivers Sambre and Meuse. It was created on 1 October 1795, when the Austrian Netherlands and the Prince-Bishopric of Liège were officially annexed by the French Republic. Prior to this annexation, the territory included in the department had lain in the County of Namur, the Prince-Bishopric of Liège and the Duchies of Brabant and Luxembourg.

Sambre-et-Meuse within the northern French Empire (1811)

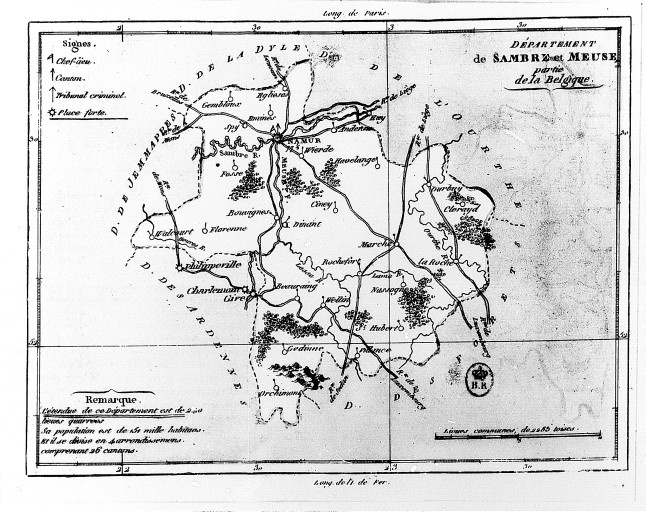
Map of the former Sambre-et-Meuse département

The Chef-lieu of the department was Namur. The department was subdivided into the following four arrondissements and cantons:

- Namur: Andenne, Dhuy, Fosses, Gembloux and Namur (2 cantons).
- Dinant: Beauraing, Ciney, Dinant, Florennes and Walcourt.
- Marche: Durbuy, Érezée, Havelange, La Roche, Marche and Rochefort.
- Saint-Hubert: Gedinne, Nassogne, Saint-Hubert and Wellin.

After Napoleon was defeated in 1814, the department was dissolved and later became part of the United Kingdom of the Netherlands. Its territory is now divided between the Belgian provinces of Namur and Luxembourg.

== Administration ==
=== Prefects ===
The Prefect was the highest state representative in the department.

Term start	Term end	Office holder
2 March 1800	17 April 1806	Emmanuel Pérès de la Gesse
3 January 1814	30 May 1814	Jean Paul Alban de Villeneuve-Bargemon

=== Secretaries-General ===
The Secretary-General was the deputy to the Prefect.

Term start	Term end	Office holder
2 March 1800	?? ?? 1803	Corneille Joseph Bauchau
?? ?? 1803	30 May 1814	L.A. Fallon

=== Subprefects of Dinant ===
Term start	Term end	Office holder
23 April 1800	7 April 1813	Louis Joseph Delevingne
7 April 1813	30 May 1814	Claude François Prudhomme

=== Subprefects of Marche ===
Term start	Term end	Office holder
23 April 1800	24 May 1800	Dewal
24 May 1800	30 May 1814	Jacques François Joseph Briart

=== Subprefects of Namur ===
The office of Subprefect of Namur was held by the Prefect until 1811.

Term start	Term end	Office holder
14 January 1811	30 May 1814	Edouard Auxy

=== Subprefects of Saint-Hubert ===
Term start	Term end	Office holder
23 April 1800	30 May 1814	Louis Dieudonné Joseph Dewez
