= Critoniella =

Scientific classification
- Kingdom: Plantae
- Clade: Embryophytes
- Clade: Tracheophytes
- Clade: Spermatophytes
- Clade: Angiosperms
- Clade: Eudicots
- Clade: Asterids
- Order: Asterales
- Family: Asteraceae
- Subfamily: Asteroideae
- Tribe: Eupatorieae
- Genus: Critoniella; R.M.King & H.Rob.

Genus of flowering plants

Critoniella is a genus of South American flowering plants in the family Asteraceae.

Species

- Critoniella acuminata (Kunth) R.M.King & H.Rob. - Venezuela, Ecuador, Colombia, Peru
- Critoniella albertosmithii (B.L.Rob.) R.M.King & H.Rob. - Colombia
- Critoniella lebrijensis (B.L.Rob.) R.M.King & H.Rob. - Colombia
- Critoniella leucolithogena (B.L.Rob.) R.M.King & H.Rob. - Ecuador, Colombia
- Critoniella tenuifolia (Kunth) R.M.King & H.Rob. - Colombia, Venezuela
- Critoniella vargasiana (DC.) R.M.King & H.Rob. - Venezuela
