= Alban de Villeneuve-Bargemon =

Alban de Villeneuve-Bargemont
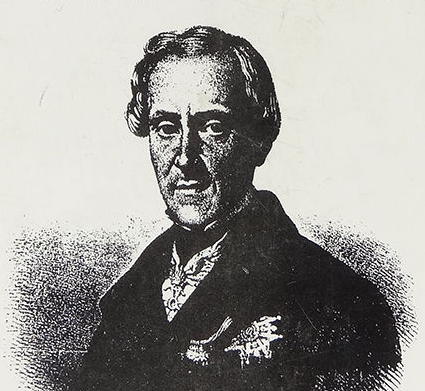

Personal details
- Born: August 8, 1784 Saint-Auban, Kingdom of France
- Died: June 8, 1850 (aged 65) Paris, Second French Republic
- Occupation: Economist, Politician
- Awards: Commander of the Legion of Honour

The Viscount Alban de Villeneuve-Bargemont (August 8, 1784 – June 8, 1850) was a French economist and politician. A Catholic nobleman, he was among the first, alongside Armand de Melun, to denounce industrial exploitation and to introduce early social legislation.

He was a member of the Académie des Sciences Morales et Politiques and a Commander of the Legion of Honour.

== Biography ==
Alban de Villeneuve-Bargemont came from one of the oldest noble families in Provence. He was the eighth of fourteen children of Joseph de Villeneuve, Lord of Bargemont, a prosecutor in Aix, and Sophie de Bausset de Roquefort. His brothers included Christophe de Villeneuve-Bargemont, Emmanuel-Ferdinand de Villeneuve-Bargemont, Joseph de Villeneuve-Bargemont, Jean-Baptiste de Villeneuve-Bargemont, and historian Louis-François de Villeneuve-Bargemont.

He was the nephew of Pierre-Ferdinand de Bausset-Roquefort, Archbishop of Aix, and the great-nephew of Barthélémy-Joseph de Villeneuve-Bargemont and Louis Jean Baptiste Le Clerc de Lassigny de Juigné, notable deputies of the Estates-General of 1789.

== Administrator ==
Villeneuve-Bargemont served as an auditor at the Council of State in 1810, sub-prefect of Zierikzee (1811), prefect of Bouches-de-l'Èbre (1812), and prefect of Sambre-et-Meuse (1814). During the Bourbon Restoration, he held several prefecture posts, including Tarn-et-Garonne, Charente, Creuse, Meurthe, Loire-Inférieure, and Nord. He was appointed Councillor of State in 1828 but as a Legitimist refused to the oath to Louis Philippe following the July Revolution of 1830.

== Parliamentary Career ==
Villeneuve-Bargemont was elected as a deputy in 1830 and aligned with the Legitimists. He re-entered politics in 1840, representing Lille until 1848, where he focused on social legislation. He was instrumental in introducing laws regulating child labor.

== Contributions to Social Catholicism ==
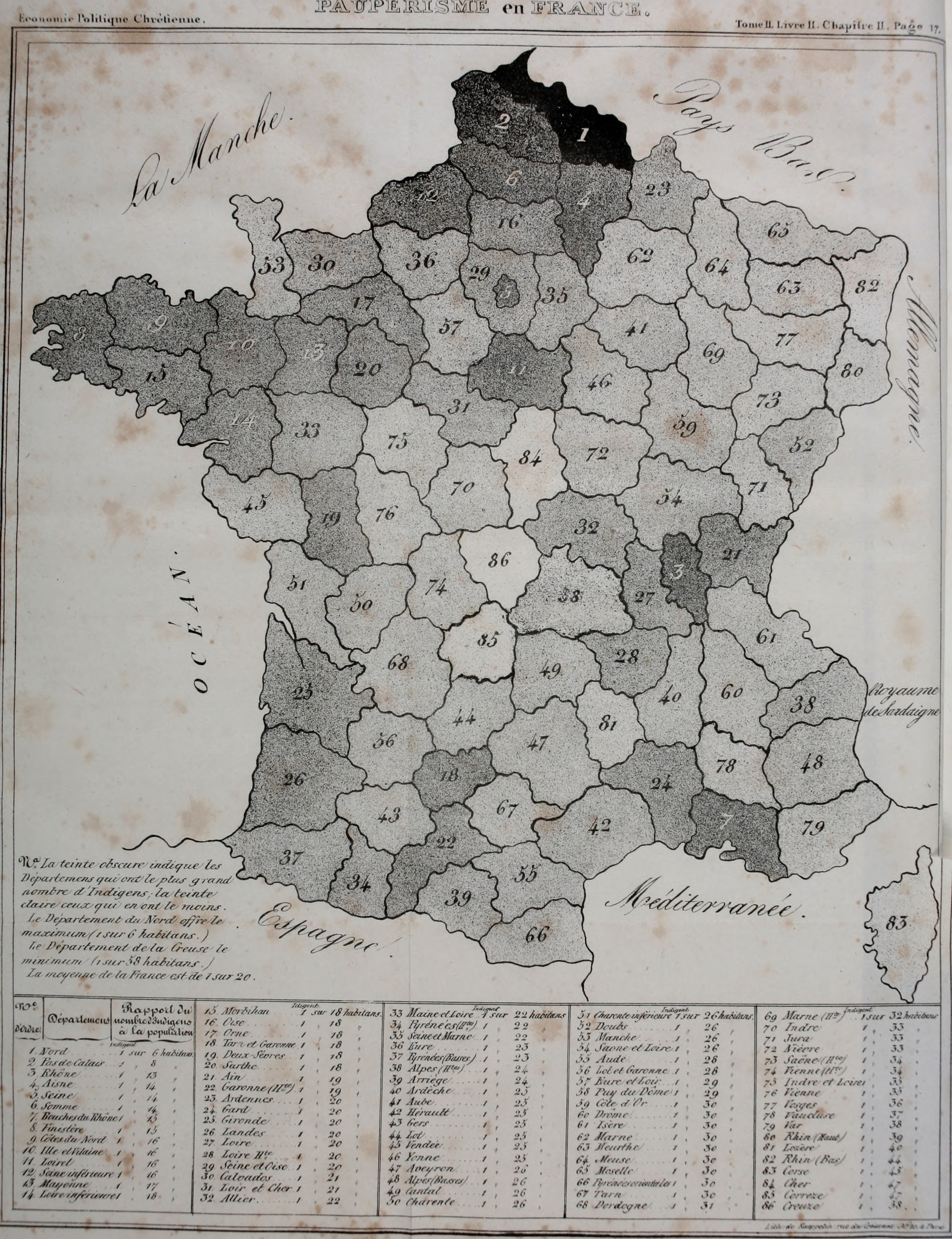
Map about poverty in France, from Villeneuve-Bargemont's 1834 book Économie politique chrétienne

Villeneuve-Bargemont is recognized for addressing the "social question" in France before Karl Marx. He criticized industrial capitalism for exploiting workers without moral or physical safeguards, from a Catholic perspective.

=== Publications ===
His notable works include:

- Christian Political Economy (1834)
- History of Political Economy (1835–1837)
- Discourses on Child Labor Laws (1840)
- The Book of the Afflicted (1841)
- On the State of Political Economy in Spain (1844)

== Personal life ==
Villeneuve-Bargemont was married twice, to Mathilde Dubreil de Frégose (d. 1822) and Emma de Carbonnel de Canisy. He had five children, including Adrienne de Villeneuve-Bargemont, a lady-in-waiting to Empress Eugénie, and Elzéar de Villeneuve, a cavalry officer.

His papers are preserved at the National Archives of France.
