= Amélie Carette =

French memoir writer and courtier (1839–1926)

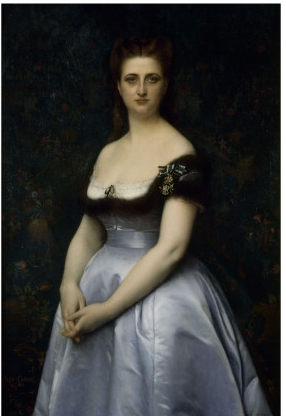
- Portrait by Alexandre Cabanel (1868)
- Born: Amélie Césarie Bouvet; 28 January 1839
- Died: 1926 (aged 86–87)
- Other name: Madame Carette
- Spouse: Henry Carette (m. 1866)

Signature
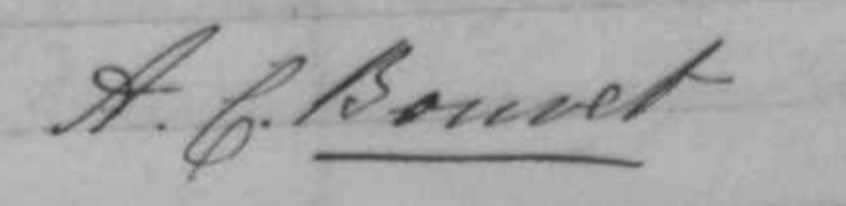

Amélie Césarie Carette (/kæˈrɛt/, French: [ameli sezaʁi kaʁɛt]; née Bouvet; 28 January 1839 – c. 1926), commonly known as Madame Carette, was a French memoirist and lady-in-waiting at the court of Napoleon III. She is best remembered for her memoirs, Souvenirs intimes de la cour des Tuileries, which provide a detailed account of life at the French Imperial court during the Second Empire.

== Biography ==
=== Early life and family ===
Amélie Césarie Bouvet was born on 28 January 1839 and raised in Brittany, the daughter of Colonel Pierre-Auguste Bouvet (1809–1864) and granddaughter of Pierre François Étienne Bouvet de Maisonneuve (1775–1860). When her father died in 1864, Amélie and her mother were left in financial hardship.

Her introduction to the imperial court came in August 1858, during a ball held on the occasion of the visit of the Emperor Napoleon and the Empress Eugénie to Saint-Malo and Saint-Servan. It was there that she was first introduced to, and impressed, the Empress.

=== Marriage ===
On 22 April 1866 Amélie married Jean Pierre Henry Carette (1822–1896), member of the General Council of Aisne. His fortune was estimated to exceed three million francs. The couple had three sons: Eugène Louis (born 1867), Pierre Amédée (born 1869), and François Pierre (born 1874).

So valued was Amélie at court, and so generous the Empress, that when her engagement was announced, Eugénie offered a dowry of 300,000 francs and the title of Honorary Chamberlain to Amélie's future husband. Out of love for his fiancée, Henry declined both offers.

=== Life at court ===
Following the death of her father in 1864, Amélie was appointed second reader to Empress Eugénie after Henri Conneau conveyed the news of his decease to the Empress, who then decided to offer Amélie a position at court remembering their encounter in 1858. In 1866 she then filled the vacant position of Louise Poitelon du Tarde as lady-in-waiting (Dame du Palais) to the Empress until 1870. While the Empress's reader, in contrast to what was normally the case, she was housed in the Tuileries Palace rather than having her own residence and merely visiting the court during work hours, though this may have changed after her marriage to Carette and promotion to lady-in-waiting, as she describes in her memoirs being collected by the court carriage during her week of service to the Empress and being driven to the Tuileries.

She was well regarded by the Empress, who often chose her to accompany her on incognito trips around Paris. One notable occasion was on a visit the Empress made to sufferers of the cholera outbreak in October 1865, when they visited the hospitals of Beaujon, Lariboisière and Saint-Antoine. Amélie did accompany the Empress on this trip, but was forbidden by the Emperor from leaving the carriage to enter the wards with her, despite her reluctance. In her memoir she describes the visit, including their return to Saint-Cloud in which "the Empress had the sweet emotion of noticing that her dress was cut into large pieces. The women of the people had distributed these shreds of her garment to preserve them as one preserves relics."

She was described as bearing a remarkable likeness to the Empress, and was considered to be quite beautiful as well. It was after Amélie's marriage that the Empress urged her to sit for a portrait with Alexandre Cabanel, in order to see how he would do, before deciding if he would paint one of her as well. Due to scheduling issues with the Empress, a portrait of her never came to fruition.

=== Later life ===
Following the fall of the Second Empire after France's defeat in the Franco-Prussian War and the royal family's exile in Great Britain, little is known of Amélie's later years. She seemed to have remained connected to Empress Eugenie, and was noted as part of her entourage during the lying-in-state of Napoleon during his funeral at Camden Place in 1873. There is no record of her holding any further official court position, but it is noted that Eugénie gave Amélie a portrait of herself in 1880 in Camden Place, just before her visit to her son's death site in Zululand.

It is unclear whether she continued writing beyond her memoirs, which she published in 1889, but Amélie's memoirs remain an important source on the customs, intrigues, and personalities of the Second Empire's court life.

== Bibliography ==
- Michelet, Maxime (16 January 2020). L'impératrice Eugénie - Une vie politique [Empress Eugenie - A Political Life] (in French). Éditions du Cerf. ISBN 9782204137614.
- Legge, Edward (1911). The comedy and tragedy of the second empire, Paris society in the sixties, including letters of Napoleon III, M. Pietri, and Comte de la Chapelle, and portraits of the period. Scribner's.
- Bicknell, Anna L. (1895). Life in the Tuileries under the second empire. The Century Company.
- Fleury, Comte (1920). Memoirs Of The Empress Eugenie. Vol. 1.
