= François Victor Masséna =

French amateur ornithologist (1799–1863)

François Victor Masséna, 3rd Prince of Essling and 3rd Duke of Rivoli (born 2 April 1799 in Antibes, died 16 April 1863) was a French amateur ornithologist. He was the youngest of four children of Marshal André Masséna, Prince of Essling and Duke of Rivoli, and Anne Marie Rosalie Lamare. His siblings were Victoire Thècle Masséna, Marie Anne Elisabeth Masséna and Jacques Prosper Masséna.

Masséna accumulated a large bird collection of 12,500 specimens, which he sold to Dr. Thomas Bellerby Wilson in 1846. Wilson gave the collection to the Philadelphia Academy of Natural Sciences. Masséna described a number of new parrots with his nephew Charles de Souancé, including the green-cheeked parakeet. The slaty-tailed trogon, crimson-mantled woodpecker and Rivoli's hummingbird were all named in his honor.

In 1823 he married Anna Masséna, Duchess of Rivoli and they had four children. Anna's hummingbird was named in her honor by fellow ornithologist René Primevère Lesson.
