= Anne d'Essling =

French courtier (1802–1887)

- Duchess of Rivoli; Princess d'Essling
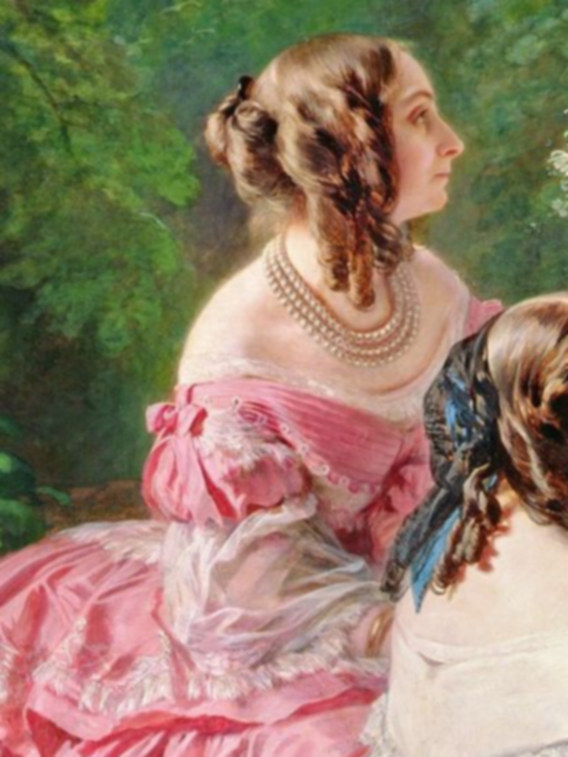
- Portrait by Franz Xaver Winterhalter, 1855
- Born: Anne Debelle; 28 July 1802
- Died: 28 January 1887 (aged 84); Nice, France
- Noble family: Debelle
- Spouse: François Victor Massena, 3rd Duke of Rivoli
- Issue: Victor Masséna d'Essling; Anna Masséna
- Father: Jean-François Joseph Debelle
- Mother: Marguerite Justine Deschaux
- Occupation: Grand-Maitresse to Empress Eugénie de Montijo

Anne Debelle, Princesse d'Essling (28 July 1802 – 28 January 1887), was a French courtier. She served as Grand-Maitresse (senior lady-in-waiting) to Empress Eugénie de Montijo in 1853–1870.

== Life ==
She was the daughter of Jean-François Joseph Debelle and Marguerite Justine Deschaux. She married the amateur ornithologist François Victor Masséna, 2nd Duke of Rivoli and 3rd Prince d'Essling, in 1823. She had four children.

=== Court career ===
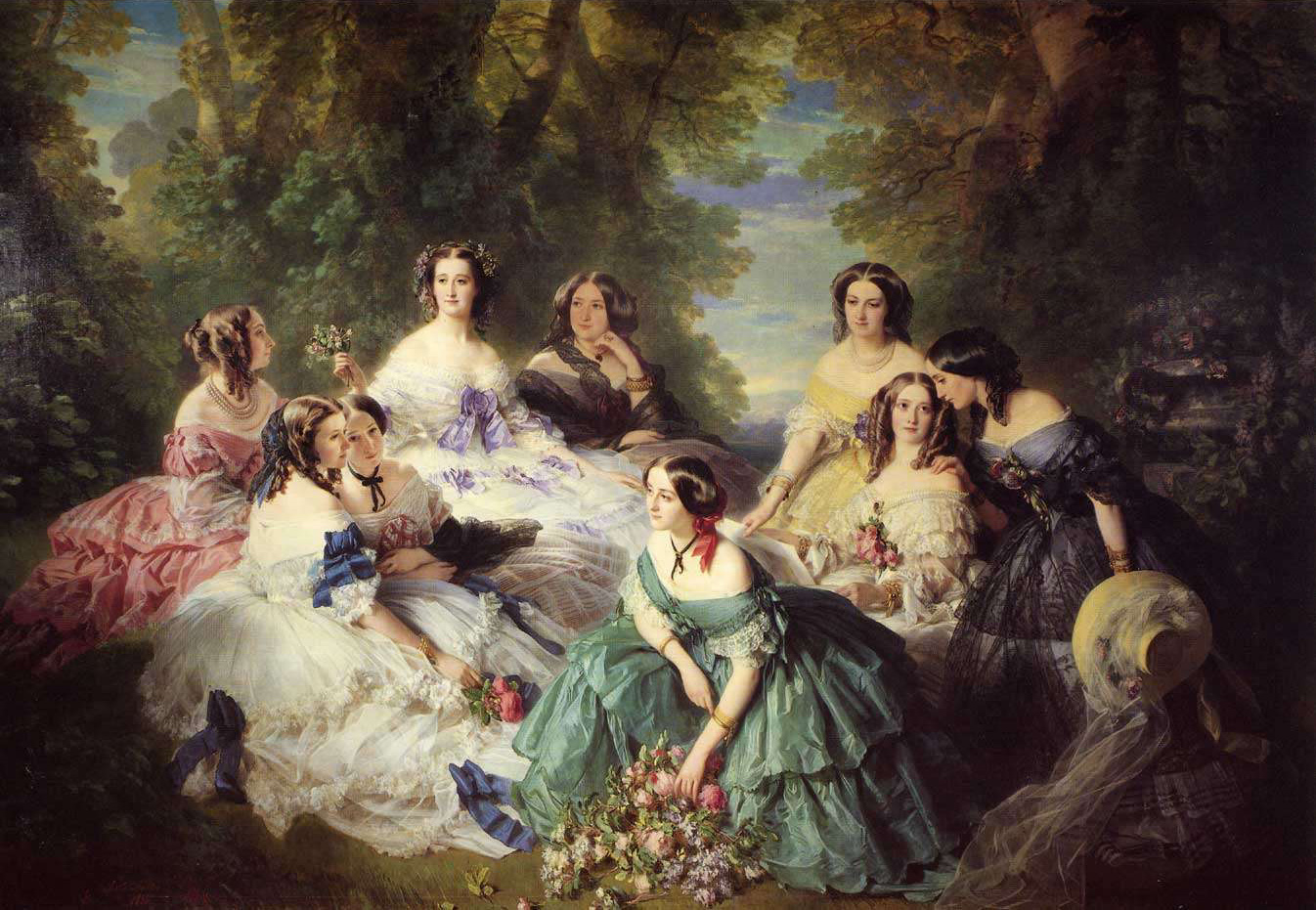
The Empress Eugenie (upper left, with the purple bow) in 1855, surrounded by her ladies in waiting, painted by her favourite artist, Franz Xaver Winterhalter. Anne d'Essling is the one in the pink dress on the far left.

After the introduction of the Second Empire and the marriage of Emperor Napoleon III to Eugénie de Montijo, she was appointed to the Household of the new Empress. The ladies-in-waiting of the new Empress consisted of a Grand-Maitresse or senior lady-in-waiting, the Princesse d'Essling; a Dame d'honneur or deputy, the Duchesse de Bassano, who both attended court on grand functions; and six (later twelve) Dame du Palais, who were selected from among the acquaintances to the Empress prior to her marriage, and who alternated in pairs fulfilling the daily duties.

As Grande-Maitresse, Anne d'Essling was first in rank of all female courtiers. It was her task to supervise all the other ladies-in-waiting and their schedule, and receive all applications from people wishing to be given an audience with the empress. In practice, however, she normally delegated this to the next in rank, dame d'honneur Pauline de Bassano. Alongside the dame d'honneur, it was also her task to be present at the side of the empress at all grander public representational state occasions, and she was as such a well known public figure. She did not attend court daily but only on state functions and important events, such as state dinners. She did, however, make a formal visit to the Tuilieres each day when Eugenie was in Paris, to learn the empress' wishes, and then leave again. It was noted how she often saved the empress from making a blunder with her naming list, as the functions Eugenie was required to host was so large that she often forgot the names of her guests. She accompanied the emperor and empress on the state visit to Great Britain in 1857.

She also hosted a salon on Rue Jean Goujon that was frequented by members of Parisian society.

Anne d'Essling has been described as thin and fragile in her appearance, and stiff, formal and proud in her behavior, though closer acquaintances saw her as friendly and intelligent. She was described in retrospect:

Pretty and refined in appearance, with an exceedingly lofty manner, though small in stature, the Princesse d'Essling occupied throughout the entire duration of the empire the highest position in her Majesty's service. Scrupulously particular regarding her dignity, she never went out unless she rode in state. [...] She was the sort of woman to mount the steps of the scaffold with dignity, like the ladies of Marie-Antoinette's court. She seemed, on first acquaintance, somewhat stiff and formal, but was in reality extremely kindhearted and intelligent. After the war, being old and feeble, she withdrew almost entirely from social activity; but the number of friends who still clung to her and who remained her faithful adherents proved the high esteem in which she was held.

She remained in service until the fall of the monarchy and was present with the Empress in the Tuileries Palace during the fall of the Second Empire in 1870. She then retired from high society life.

== Legacy ==
She belongs to the ladies-in-waiting depicted with Eugenie in the famous painting Empress Eugénie Surrounded by her Ladies in Waiting by Franz Xaver Winterhalter from 1855.

René Primevère Lesson named the “Anna's hummingbird” after her.
