= Pauline de Bassano =

French courtier (1814–1867)

- Duchess de Bassano
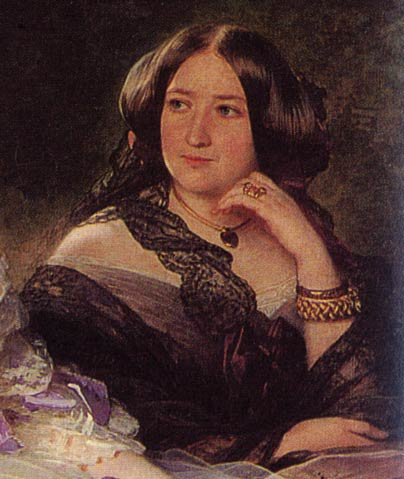
- Born: Pauline Marie Ghislaine van der Linden d'Hooghvorst; 23 September 1814; Meise
- Died: 9 December 1867 (aged 53)
- Spouses: Napoléon Maret, 2nd Duke of Bassano
- Issue: Napoléon Maret de Bassano
- Father: Emmanuel van der Linden d'Hoogvorst
- Occupation: Dame d'honneur to Empress Eugénie de Montijo

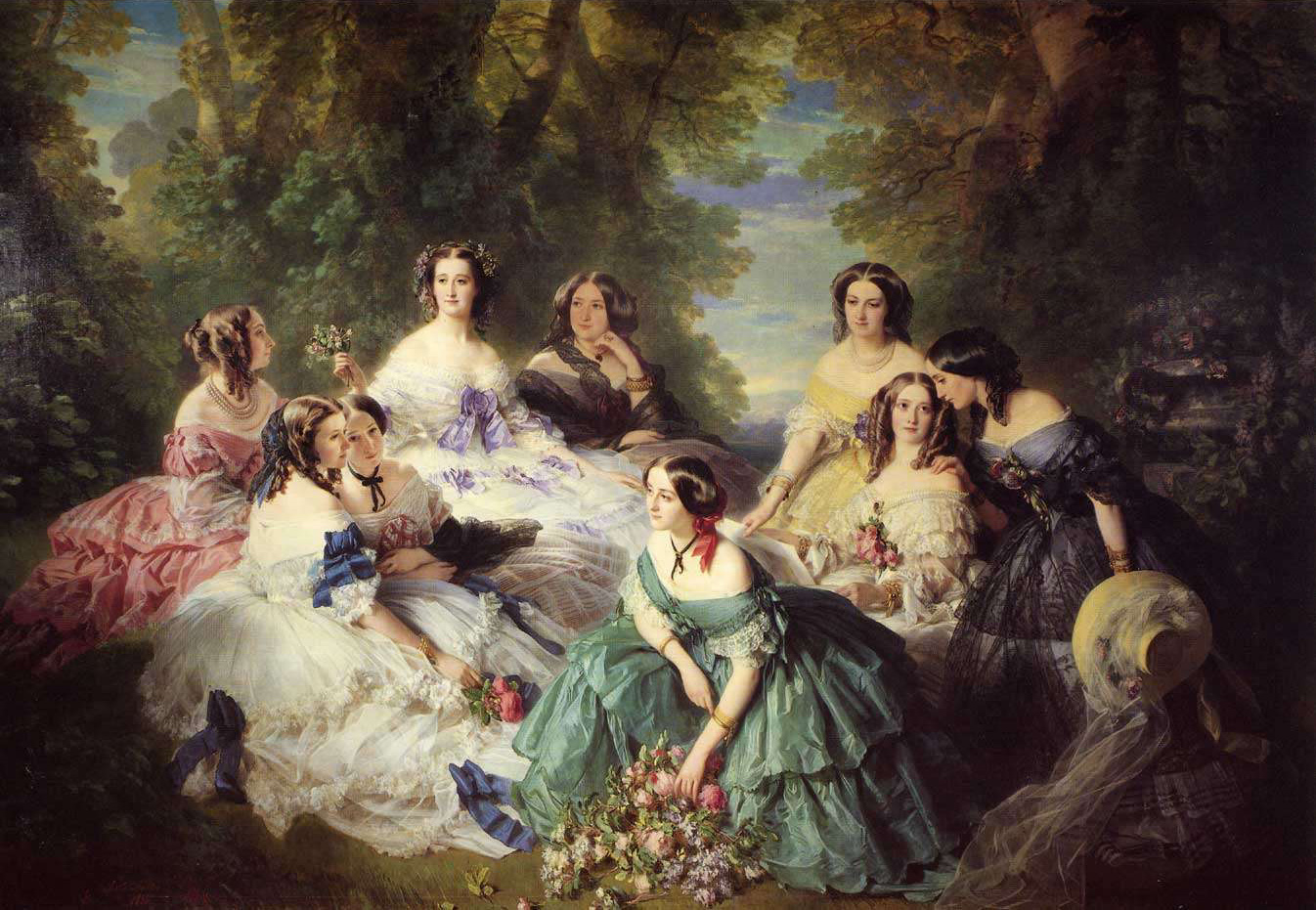
The Empress Eugenie (upper left, with the purple bow) in 1855, surrounded by her ladies in waiting, painted by her favourite artist, Franz Xaver Winterhalter. Pauline de Bassano is the one sitting beside the empress on her right.

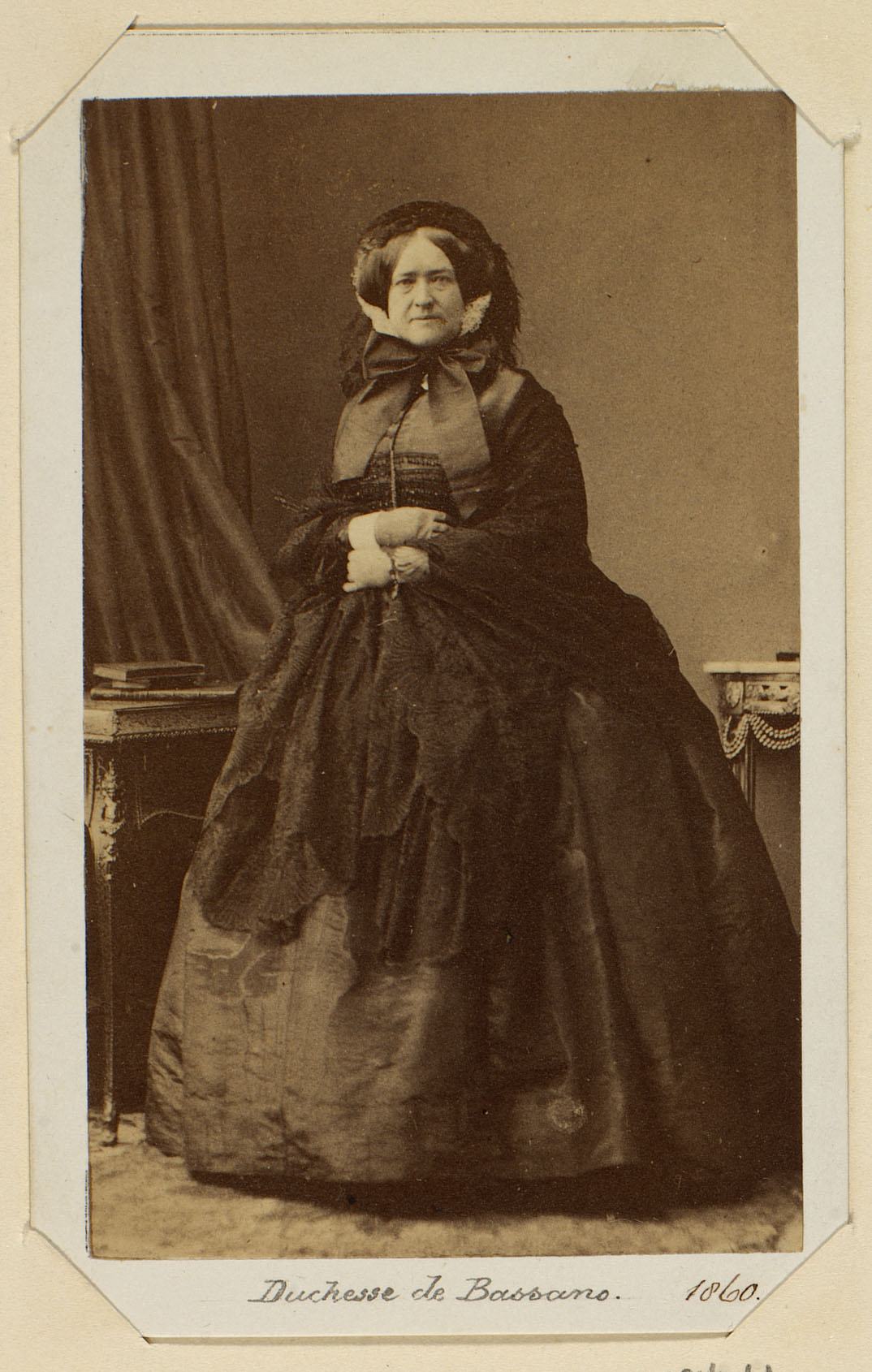
Pauline de Bassano (1814-67) 1860

Pauline Marie Ghislaine de Bassano, née van der Linden d'Hooghvorst (23 September 1814 in Meise – 9 December 1867), was a French courtier. She served as dame d'honneur to Empress Eugénie de Montijo in 1853–1867.

== Life ==
She was born to the Belgian politician Emmanuel van der Linden d'Hoogvorst. In 1843, she married the French diplomat Napoléon Hugues Charles Marie Ghislain Maret de Bassano, 3rd Duc de Bassano. Her mother-in-law, Madeleine Lejéas-Carpentier, had been dame du palais to the Empresses Josephine and Marie-Louise.

=== Court career ===
In 1853, her spouse was appointed chamberlain to Emperor Napoleon III of France, and she appointed Dame d'honneur to the Empress. The ladies-in-waiting of the new Empress consisted of a Grand-Maitresse or senior lady-in-waiting, the Princesse d'Essling; a Dame d'honneur or deputy, the Duchesse de Bassano, who both attended court on grand functions; and six (later twelve) Dame du Palais, who were selected from among the acquaintances to the Empress prior to her marriage, and who alternated in pairs fulfilling the daily duties.

It belonged to her task to receive the applications from the women wishing to be presented at court, instruct them in etiquette, approve them and finally present them, which was an important part of the Imperial protocol of representation. She also supervised the other female courtiers. Alongside the princesse d'Essling, de Bassano had a very visible public position as it belonged to her duty to accompany the empress at all grander representational public events. Being a public figure who dealt with those wishing admission to the court, she is also frequently depicted in contemporary memoirs.Pauline de Bassano have been described as attractive, stable, imposing and somewhat arrogant. A contemporary described her as "a very distinguished looking woman, had a most charming manner and performed her duties with much discretion."

She had an apartment in the Tuileries, and hosted private functions attended by the Parisian elite, which the empress sometimes attended, and which played a valuable role in recruiting connections and supporters of value for the Second Empire regime. She served until her death in 1867, and was replaced by Marie-Anne Walewska.

== Legacy ==
She belonged to the ladies-in-waiting depicted with Eugenie in the famous painting Empress Eugénie Surrounded by her Ladies in Waiting by Franz Xaver Winterhalter from 1855.

Court offices
Preceded by Christine-Zoë de Montjoye	Première dame d'honneur 1853–1867	Succeeded by Marie-Anne Walewska
