= Dame d'honneur =

Dame d'honneur (French pronunciation: [dam dɔnœʁ], lit. 'lady of honour') was a common title for two categories of French ladies-in-waiting, who are often confused because of the similarity.

Dame d'honneur can be:

- Short for Première dame d'honneur, which were commonly shortened to Dame d'honneur, or;
- The full, formal title for Dame du Palais, which until 1674 was formally called Dame d'honneur, though commonly shortened to Dame.
