= Philippe Charles =

Philippe Charles is a compound given name that may refer to:

- Philippe-Charles, 3rd Count of Arenberg (1587―1640)
- Philippe Charles, 3rd Duke of Arenberg (1663―1691)
- Philippe Charles, Duke of Anjou (1668-1671)
- Philippe Charles, Duke of Valois (1664―1666)
- Philippe Charles de La Fare (1687―1752)
- Philippe Charles Lucien Christanval (1978―)
- Philippe-Charles Schmerling (1791―1836)
- Philippe Charles Tronson du Coudray (1738–1777)

== See also ==
- Charles-Philippe
