= Philippe of Anjou =

Philippe of Anjou (Philippe d'Anjou) may refer to:

- Philip I, Prince of Taranto (1278–1332)
- Philip II, Prince of Taranto (1329–1374)
- Philippe I, Duke of Orléans (1640–1701), second son of Louis XIII of France, titled Duke of Anjou at birth
- Philippe-Charles, Duke of Anjou (1668–1671), second son of Louis XIV of France
- Philip V of Spain (1683–1746), titled Duke of Anjou at birth
- Philippe of France (1730–1733), son of Louis XV of France
