= Philip of France =

Philip of France might refer to:

- Philip I of France (1053–1108), King of France
- Philip of France (1116–1131), co-king of France, son of Louis VI of France aka Louis the Fat
- Philip of France, Archdeacon of Paris (1132–1161), son of Louis the Fat
- Philip II of France, known as Philip Augustus, (1165–1223), King of France
- Philippe Hurepel (1200–1234), count of Boulogne, son of Philip II of France
- Philip of France (1209–1218), son of Louis VIII of France
- Philip of France (1218–1220), son of Louis VIII of France
- Philip Dagobert (1222–1232), son of Louis VIII of France
- Philip III of France (1245–1285), called Philip the Bold, King of France
- Philip IV of France (1268–1314), called Philip the Fair, King of France
- Philip V of France (1291–1322), called Philip the Tall, King of France
- Philip of France (1313–1321), son of Philip V of France
- Philip VI of France (1293–1349), called Philip of Valois, King of France
- Philip of Valois, Duke of Orléans (1336–1375), son of Philip VI of France
- Philip the Bold, aka Philip II, Duke of Burgundy (1342–1404), son of John II of France
- Philip of France (1407–1407), son of Charles VI of France
- Philip de France (1436–1436), son of Charles VII of France
- Philippe I, Duke of Orléans (1640–1701), son of Louis XIII of France
- Philippe Charles, Duke of Anjou (1668–1671), son of Louis XIV of France
- Philip V of Spain (1683–1746), formerly Philip, Duke of Anjou, grandson of Louis XIV of France
