= Pierre de Villars =

French diplomat

Pierre de Villars (1623, Paris - 20 March 1698, Paris), known by courtesy as the Marquis de Villars, was a French diplomat and Councillor of State.

He was the son of Claude de Villars, mestre de camp and gentleman of the King's bedchamber, and of his wife Charlotte Louvet de Nogaret-Calvisson, and grandson of René of Savoy, known as the Bastard of Savoy (Bâtard de Savoie), and thus (illegitimately) the great-grandson of Philip II, Duke of Savoy.

He was married to Marie Gigault de Bellefonds and they had two sons, Armand (died 1712) and Claude-Louis-Hector (1653–1734) who inherited his father's title, Marquis de Villars.

Between 1679 and 1681, Villars and his wife were assigned to the royal court in Madrid to represent French King Louis XIV to Spanish King Charles II and his new French-born wife: Marie Louise d'Orléans, the young and beautiful niece of Louis XIV.

== Sources ==
- (in French) Ferdinand Hoefer, Nouvelle Biographie générale, t. 45, Paris, Firmin-Didot, 1866, p. 166-7
