= Henrietta of England =

English and French princess (1644–1670)

- Duchess of Orléans
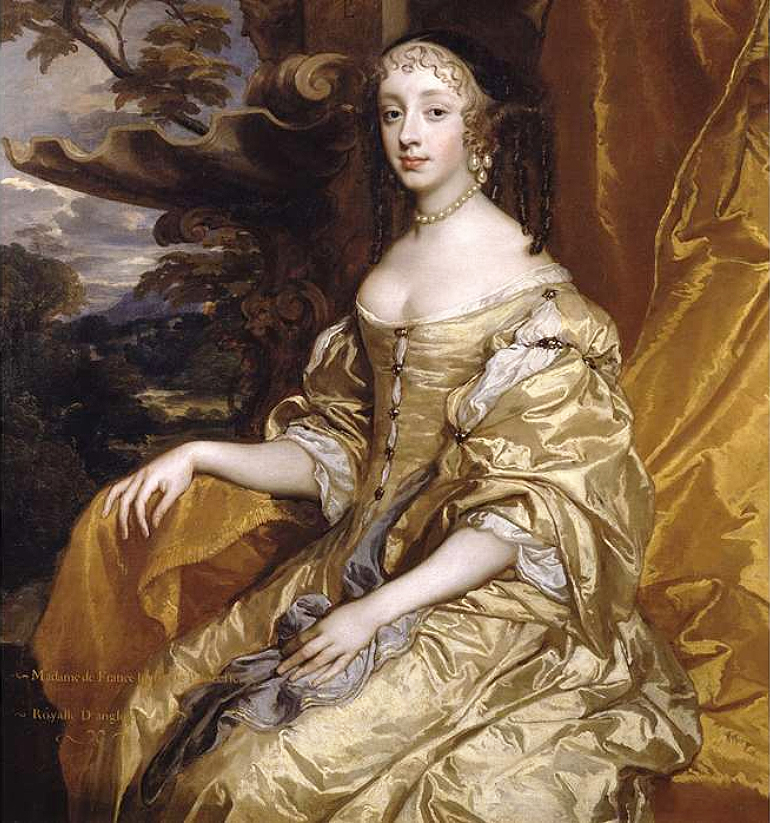
- Portrait by Sir Peter Lely, 1669
- Born: 16 June 1644; Bedford House, Exeter, England
- Died: 30 June 1670 (aged 26); Château de Saint Cloud, France
- Burial: 4 July 1670; Basilica of St Denis
- Spouse: Philippe I, Duke of Orléans (m. 1661)
- Issue more...: Marie Louise, Queen of Spain; Philippe Charles, Duke of Valois; Anne Marie, Queen of Sardinia
Names
- Henrietta Anne Stuart
- House: Stuart (by birth); Orléans (by marriage)
- Father: Charles I of England
- Mother: Henrietta Maria of France

Henrietta of England (Henrietta Anne Stuart; 16 June 1644 O.S. [26 June 1644 N.S.] – 30 June 1670) was the youngest child of King Charles I of England and Henrietta Maria of France. She was Duchess of Orléans through her marriage to Philippe I, Duke of Orléans.

Fleeing England with her mother as an infant in the midst of the English Civil War, Henrietta moved to the court of her first cousin King Louis XIV of France, where she was known as Minette. She married her cousin Philippe d'Orléans and became a fille de France, but their relationship was marked by frequent tensions over suitors common to the two.

Henrietta played an instrumental role in negotiating the Secret Treaty of Dover between France and England against the Dutch Republic in June 1670, the same month as her unexpected death at the age of 26. Jacobite claims to the British throne after Henry Benedict Stuart's death descend from her daughter Anne Marie.

== Infancy in England ==
Henrietta was born on 16 June 1644, on the eve of the Second Battle of Newbury during the Civil War, at Bedford House in Exeter, a seat of William Russell, 5th Earl of Bedford, who had recently returned to the Royalist side. Her father was King Charles I of England, and her mother, Queen Henrietta Maria, was the youngest daughter of Henry IV of France and Marie de' Medici. All her life, Henrietta had a close relationship with her mother. Her connections with the French court as niece of Louis XIII and cousin of Louis XIV proved very useful later in life.

Shortly before Henrietta's birth, her mother had been forced to leave Oxford for Exeter, where she arrived on 1 May 1644. Many thought she would not survive the birth due to her state of health. After a particularly difficult birth, Henrietta was put in the care of Anne Villiers, Countess of Morton, known at that time as Lady Dalkeith. For Henrietta's safety, the queen made her way to Falmouth and then returned to France to ask Louis XIV to assist her husband's war efforts. Arriving at Falmouth in mid-July, the queen was informed that Henrietta had been taken ill with convulsions, from which she recovered. On 26 July, Henrietta met her father, Charles I of England, for the first time. Before his arrival, he had ordered that Henrietta be baptised in accordance with the rites of the Church of England, and she was baptised Henrietta at Exeter Cathedral on 21 July. A canopy of state was erected in honour of her dignity as a princess of England. Henrietta was moved to Oatlands Palace outside London, where she and her household lived for three months before fleeing secretly in June 1646; Lady Dalkeith ensured Henrietta's safe arrival in France, where she was reunited with her mother.

== Life and marriage in France ==
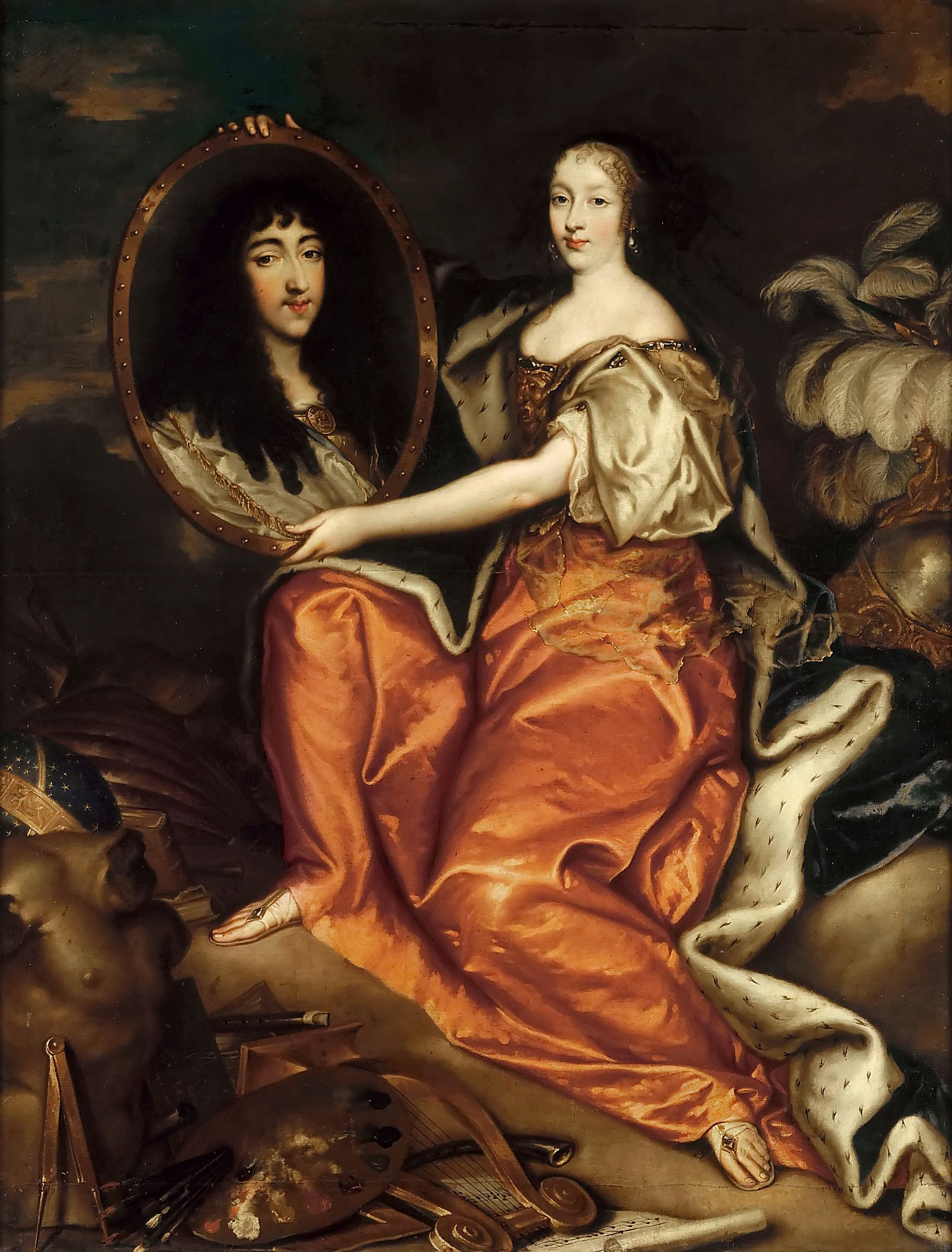
Henrietta as Minerva holding a painting of Monsieur by Antoine Mathieu

While living at the French court, Henrietta was given the name Anne in honour of her aunt, the French queen Anne of Austria. When she first arrived, she was known as Henriette d'Angleterre or the princesse d'Angleterre in France. She and her mother were given apartments at the Louvre, a monthly pension of 30,000 livres and the use of the Château de Saint-Germain-en-Laye. This lavish establishment soon diminished, as all the money Queen Henrietta Maria received was given to her husband in England or to exiled cavaliers who had fled to France. During the Fronde, the civil war that raged in France from 1648 to 1653, Henrietta and her mother stayed at the Louvre.

In February 1649, Henrietta's mother was informed of the execution of her husband, who had been beheaded on 30 January. At the end of the Fronde, Queen Henrietta Maria and her daughter moved into the Palais Royal with the young Louis XIV and his mother and brother Philippe. At the same time, Queen Henrietta Maria decided to have her daughter, who had been baptised in the Church of England, brought up as a Catholic. With the arrival of Henrietta's brother, Henry Stuart, Duke of Gloucester, in 1652, their small court was increased.

After the Fronde was over, the French court made it a priority to find a bride for the young king of France. Queen Henrietta Maria hinted at the idea of a union between Henrietta and Louis, but Queen Anne rejected the idea, preferring instead her niece by blood, Maria Theresa of Spain. Louis and Maria Theresa married in June 1660, after which Queen Anne turned her attention to her unmarried son Philippe. While residing at the Château de Colombes, Henrietta Maria's personal residence outside Paris, mother and daughter heard of the restoration of the monarchy in England under Henrietta's brother Charles II and returned to Paris. This change of fortunes caused the flamboyant Philippe, a reputed bisexual who had been party to a series of sexual scandals, to propose to Henrietta. Before this, there were rumours at court that Henrietta had received proposals from Charles Emmanuel of Savoy and the Grand Prince of Tuscany, but nothing came of them as a result of her status as an exile.

The impatient Philippe was eager to make sure he married Henrietta as soon as possible, but Queen Henrietta Maria was intent on going to England to sort out her debts, secure a dowry for Henrietta, and prevent the Duke of York's announcement of his marriage to Anne Hyde, a former maid-of-honour to the Princess Royal. During this time, Henrietta became distraught when her brother the Duke of Gloucester died of smallpox in September 1660. In October, Henrietta and her mother embarked at Calais for Dover, where they stayed at Dover Castle. The French court officially asked for Henrietta's hand on 22 November and her dowry was arranged. Charles II agreed to give his sister a dowry of 840,000 livres and a further 20,000 towards other expenses. She was also given, as a personal gift, 40,000 livres annually and the Château de Montargis as a private residence.

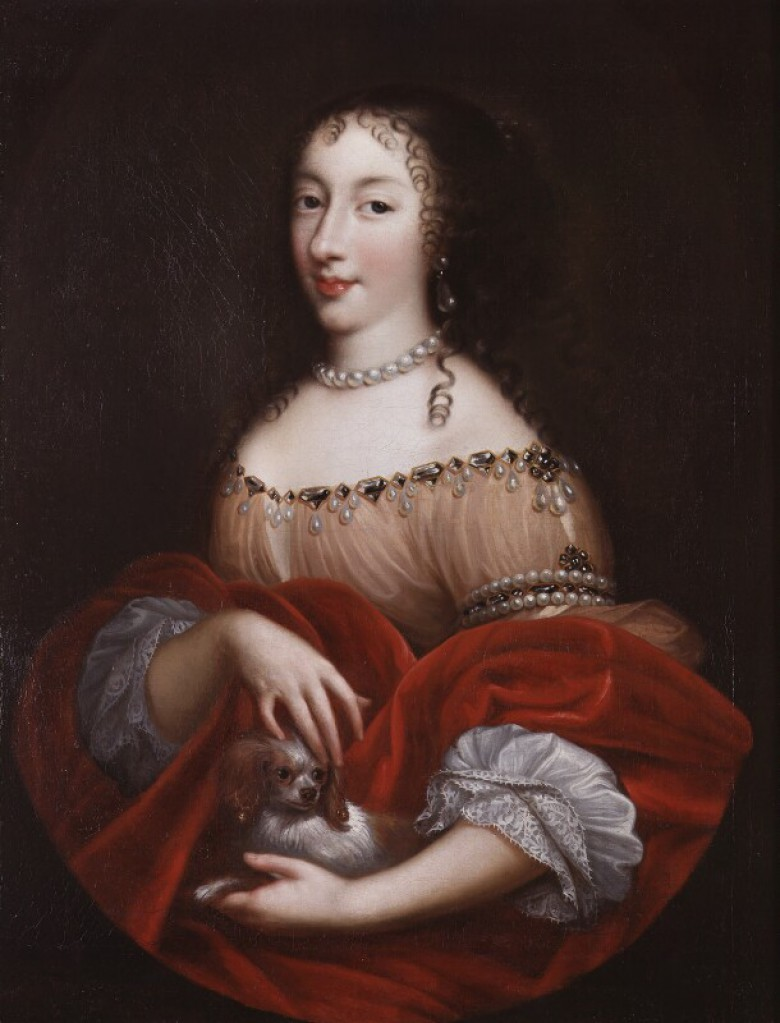
Portrait of Henrietta holding a dog, possibly painted in 1665

Henrietta's return to France was delayed by the death from smallpox of her elder sister the Princess Royal. She finally left England in January 1661. She and Philippe signed their marriage contract at the Palais Royal on 30 March 1661; the ceremony took place the next day. The marriage was elaborately celebrated and she and her husband moved into the Palais des Tuileries. As she had married Monsieur, Henrietta was styled Madame, la duchesse d'Orléans. The marriage started well and Philippe seems to have been a doting husband. A year into the marriage, Henrietta gave birth to a daughter later baptised Marie Louise. The child's paternity was doubted by some of the court, who insinuated Louis XIV or the Count of Guiche was the father. Henrietta and Guiche may have started an affair early in her marriage, despite his having been an alleged former lover of Philippe. These flirtations made the once-adoring Philippe intensely jealous, and he complained to Queen Anne.

Soon after, Louis started an affair with one of Henrietta's ladies-in-waiting, Louise de La Vallière, who had joined her household at the end of 1661 and protected Henrietta with regard to the affair of Guiche. The couple's next child was a son born in July 1664 who was given the title Duke of Valois. The son died in 1666 of convulsions after being baptised Philippe Charles hours before death. The loss of the little Duke of Valois affected Henrietta greatly. She gave birth to a stillborn daughter in July 1665, but another daughter was born in 1669 who was baptised Anne Marie in 1670. In 1666, her husband's most prominent alleged lover, Philippe, Chevalier de Lorraine, became attached to the Orléans household. Lorraine often vied for power within Philippe's household, an unusual arrangement for the time. Henrietta has often been praised as a cultured princess, and her correspondence with Moliere, Racine, La Fontaine, Bussy-Rabutin, and others is notable. She was also a lover of gardening and created a water garden at the Palais Royal. Henrietta also amassed a large and prestigious picture collection that included paintings by Van Dyck and Corregio. Her active personality has caused historians to think that she showed signs of anorexia nervosa. Late in 1669, Queen Henrietta Maria died after taking an excessive quantity of opiates as a painkiller. Henrietta was devastated, and the situation was not helped by Philippe's immediate rush to claim all her possessions before she had even been buried.

=== Secret Treaty of Dover ===
Henrietta was instrumental in diplomatic negotiations between her native England and adopted France. Her brother Charles II, to whom she had always been very close (it was he who gave her the nickname Minette), had been trying to establish a closer relationship with France since 1663, but only in 1669 did he set the wheels in motion by secretly promising that he would become a Catholic and bring England back to Catholicism. Henrietta was eager to visit her homeland and Louis XIV encouraged her in order for the treaty to take place. Philippe, annoyed with Henrietta for flirting with Guiche and his previous lovers, remained adamant that she should not be allowed to go, complaining to Charles II that she should remain at his side in France. Appealing to Louis XIV, she managed to arrange to travel to England, where she arrived in Dover on 26 May 1670, remaining there until 1 June, the day the treaty was signed.

Charles abandoned England's Triple Alliance with Sweden and the Dutch Republic in favour of assisting Louis XIV in conquering the Dutch Republic, which he claimed for his wife Queen Maria Theresa as part of her unpaid dowry. Provided that the conquest was successfully completed, England was promised several very profitable ports along one of the major rivers that ran through the Dutch Republic. The treaty did not become public until 1830. After Henrietta's time in England, she returned to France on 18 June.

== Death, burial and aftermath ==
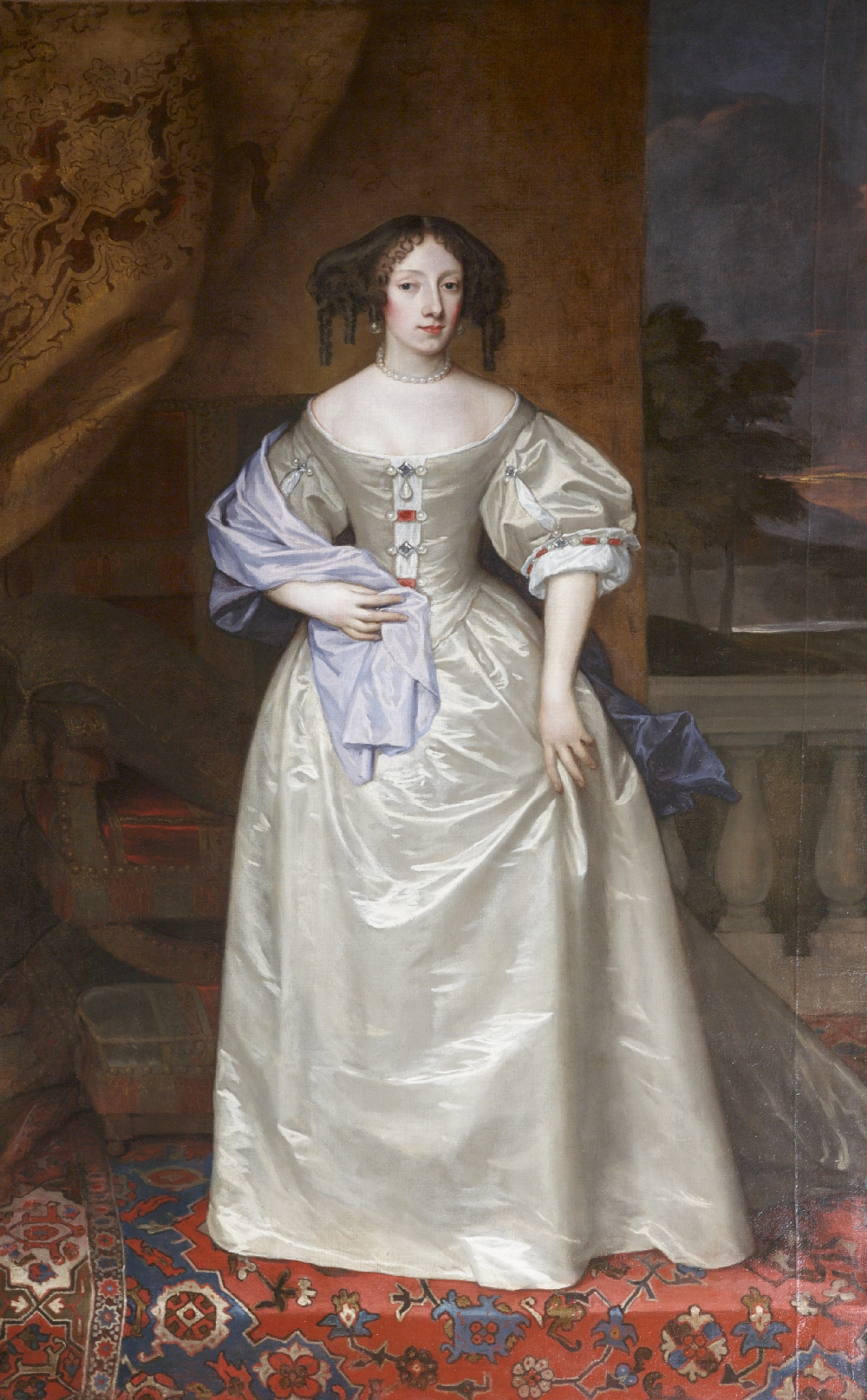
A posthumous painting by Peter Lely of Henrietta commissioned by her brother Charles II and presented to Exeter Guildhall, in which it still hangs, in recognition of her birth in the city

In 1667, Henrietta began complaining of intermittent, intense pain in her side. Beginning in April 1670, according to reports, she began having digestive problems so severe that she could consume only milk. Returning to France after the treaty, Henrietta went to stay at Saint-Cloud with her husband on 26 June. On 29 June, at five o'clock, Henrietta drank a glass of iced chicory water. According to reports, immediately after drinking the water she felt a pain in her side and cried out, "Ah! What a pain! What shall I do! I must be poisoned!" She immediately assumed she had been poisoned and asked both for an antidote and for someone to examine the chicory water. She was given common contemporary treatments for colic, as well as anti-poisons. The royal family arrived at Saint-Cloud within hours. Bishop Bossuet was called and later administered Extreme Unction. At 2 o'clock in the morning of 30 June 1670, Henrietta died. The Chevalier de Lorraine and the Marquis d'Effiat were rumoured by many to be accomplices in poisoning Henrietta, among them Philippe's second wife, Elizabeth Charlotte, Madame Palatine, and the Duc de Saint-Simon. Seventeen French and two English physicians, the English ambassador, and roughly 100 other onlookers observed the autopsy, and though the official report stated "death from cholera morbus (gastroenteritis) caused by heated bile," many observers disagreed. Despite the suspicions surrounding her death, the expert consensus since the 20th century is that she died of peritonitis from a ruptured ulcer, not poison.

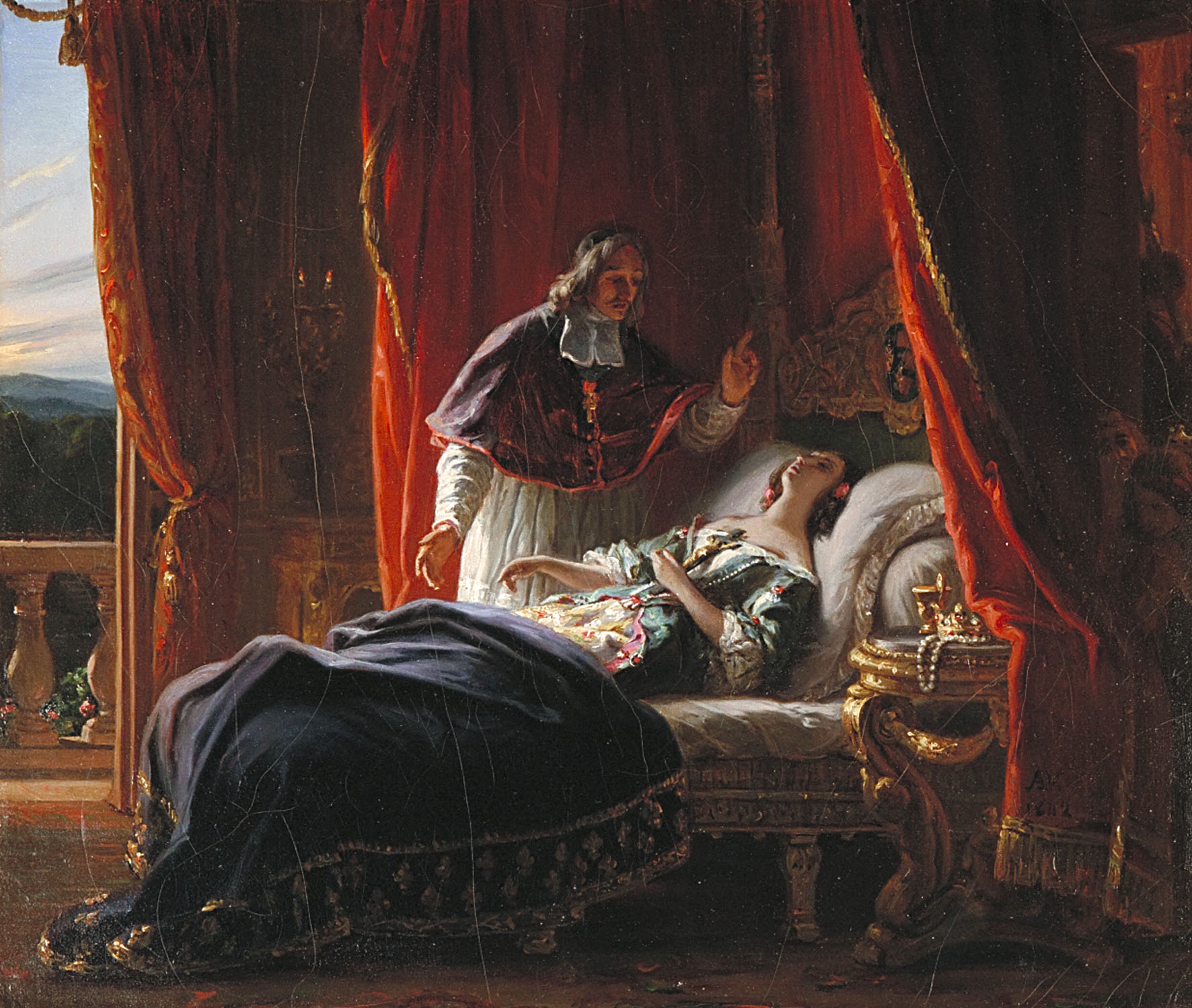
Depiction of the death of Henrietta by Auguste Vinchon

Henrietta was interred at the Basilica of St Denis on 4 July, with another service held on 21 July. All chief public bodies, including Parliament, courts of Law, Assembly of the Clergy, and the City Corporations, were represented, as well as members of the nobility and general public. Queen Maria Theresa was present with the former king of Poland, John II Casimir Vasa, and the English ambassador, the Duke of Buckingham. French princes of the blood were present as well as masses of the nobility. Her funeral oration by Bishop Bossuet became a famous piece of French oratory.

"Last of all came the members of Monsieur and Madame's household, bearing torches in their hands. A mausoleum, surrounded with altars and silver urns, and adorned with a crowd of mourning allegorical statues, among which Youth, Poetry and Music were conspicuous, had been erected in the centre of the choir. There the coffin rested, covered with cloth of gold, edged with ermine, and embroidered with the arms of France and England in gold and silver. Everyone having taken their places, hundreds of candles burst into flame giving a cloud of incense; and the Archbishop of Reims assisted by other bishops, began the Mass, which was chanted by the King's musicians organised by Lully." Monsieur married again in 1671 to Elizabeth Charlotte of the Palatinate, who, like Henrietta, was descended from Mary, Queen of Scots, sharing James VI and I as a common ancestor. Monsieur and the "new Madame" had a further two surviving children.

Henrietta's eldest daughter, Marie Louise, died, like her mother, at age 26 in Spain in 1689. The circumstances of her death were almost identical to those of her mother's, and she was also believed to have been poisoned. Her youngest daughter, Anne Marie, married in 1684 and was the mother of eight children, the eldest of whom, Maria Adélaïde, was the mother of Louis XV. Monsieur himself died in 1701. Her descendants include Jacobite claimants to the English throne, Jean, Count of Paris, the Orléanist pretender to the French throne, the king of Spain, the king of the Belgians, the grand duke of Luxembourg, and a pretender to the Italian throne.

== Issue ==
Henrietta's arms as Duchess of Orléans with the coronet of a daughter of France

1. Marie Louise d'Orléans (26 March 1662 – 12 February 1689); married Charles II of Spain, no issue
2. Miscarriage (1663)
3. Philippe Charles d'Orléans, Duke of Valois (16 July 1664 – 8 December 1666); died in infancy
4. Stillborn daughter (9 July 1665)
5. Miscarriage (1666)
6. Miscarriage (1667)
7. Miscarriage (1668)
8. Anne Marie d'Orléans (27 August 1669 – 26 August 1728); married Victor Amadeus II, Duke of Savoy (future king of Sardinia) and had issue

== Ancestry ==
Ancestors of Henrietta of England

8. Henry Stuart, Lord Darnley
4. James I of England (VI of Scotland)
9. Mary, Queen of Scots
2. Charles I of England
10. Frederick II of Denmark
5. Anne of Denmark
11. Sophia of Mecklenburg
1. Princess Henrietta Anne of England
12. Anthony, Duke of Vendôme
6. Henry IV of France
13. Joan III of Navarre
3. Henrietta Maria of France
14. Francesco I de' Medici, Grand Duke of Tuscany
7. Marie de' Medici
15. Joanna of Austria

== In popular culture ==
- In the British television miniseries Charles II: The Power and the Passion (2003), released in America as The Last King, "Minette" is played by Anne-Marie Duff.

== See also ==
- Antoine II Coëffier de Ruzé

== Bibliography ==
- Barker, Nancy Nichols (1989). Brother to the Sun King, Philippe, Duke of Orléans. Johns Hopkins University Press. ISBN 9780801837913.
- Cartwright, Julia (1900). Madame: A life of Henrietta, daughter of Charles I and Duchess of Orléans (Second ed.). London: Seeley and Co. Ltd.
- Fraser, Antonia (2006). Love and Louis XIV: The Women in the Life of the Sun King. London: Anchor Books. ISBN 978-0-7538-2293-7.
- Fraser, Antonia (1979). King Charles II. New York: Alfred A. Knopf. ISBN 0-297-77571-5.
- Louda, Jiří; Maclagan, Michael (1999) [1981], Lines of Succession: Heraldry of the Royal Families of Europe (2nd ed.), London: Little, Brown, ISBN 978-0-316-84820-6
- Mitford, Nancy (1966). The Sun King. London: Penguin Publishing. ISBN 0-14-023967-7.
- Weir, Alison (2011). Britain's Royal Families: The Complete Genealogy. Random House. p. 400. ISBN 978-1-446-44911-0.
