= Philippe Charles, Duke of Valois =

Philippe Charles
- Duke of Valois
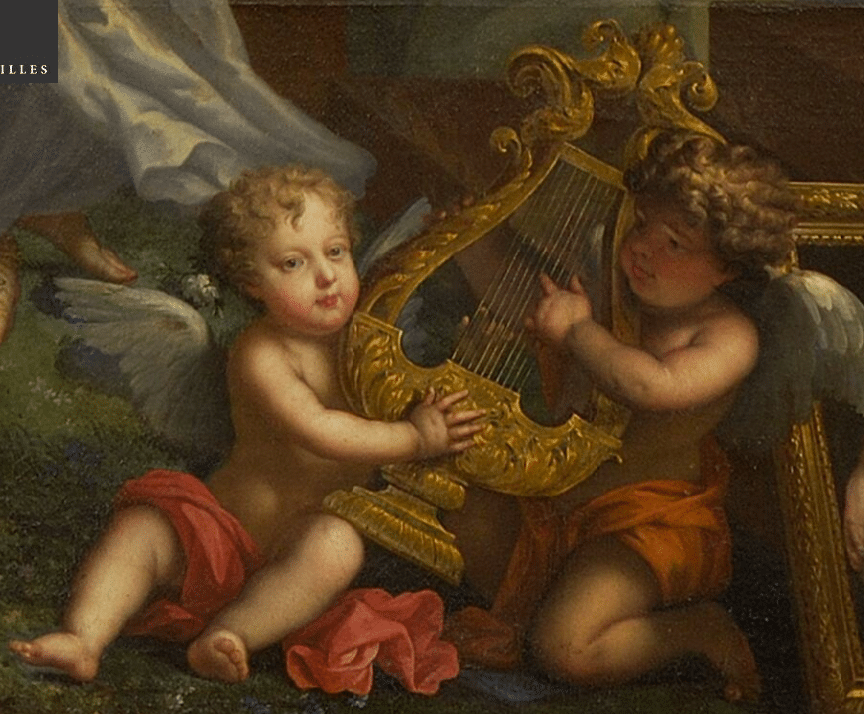
- Philippe Charles and his younger sister Anne Marie by Jean Nocret, 1670.
- Born: 16 July 1664; Fontainebleau, France
- Died: 8 December 1666 (aged 2); Palais Royal, Paris, France
- Burial: Royal Basilica, Paris, France
Names
- Philippe Charles d'Orléans
- House: Orléans
- Father: Philippe I, Duke of Orléans
- Mother: Henrietta of England

Philippe Charles d'Orléans, petit-fils de France, Duke of Valois (16 July 1664 – 8 December 1666) was a French prince and Grandson of France. He was styled Duke of Valois at the time of his birth. He was a short lived nephew of Louis XIV.

== Biography ==
Born at the Palace of Fontainebleau in July 1664, he is known from birth by his father's lesser title of Duke of Valois. His father, Philippe of France, Duke of Orléans, known at court as Monsieur was married to Henrietta of England, daughter of the murdered Charles I of England and the French born Queen Henriette Marie. As such, his parents were first cousins. He had one elder sister, Princess Marie Louise and a younger sister, Princess Anne Marie who was born after his death.

He received the names of his father, Philippe and his maternal grandfather, Charles.

Philippe Charles birth helped to smooth over the difficult relationship his parents had; his father was a renowned homosexual who was under the domination of his long term lover the "Chevalier de Lorraine". Monsieur complained that Henriette (known simply as Madame) flirted with men at court including the king himself. Court gossip claimed that Philippe Charles' own older sister Marie Louise, was the product of Louis XIV's and Madame's flirting.

After the death of the Queen mother, Anne of Austria in January 1666, Louis XIV promised to raise Philippe Charles with his first cousin le Grand Dauphin. At the end of the year, Philippe Charles himself succumbed and died at the Palais Royal in Paris, the grace and favour residence of his parents. He was buried at the Royal Basilica of Saint Denis, outside Paris.

== Ancestors ==
Ancestors of Philippe Charles, Duke of Valois

8. Henry IV of France
4. Louis XIII of France
9. Marie de' Medici
2. Philippe I, Duke of Orléans
10. Philip III of Spain
5. Anne of Austria
11. Margaret of Austria
1. Philippe Charles, Duke of Valois
12. James I of England and VI of Scotland
6. Charles I of England
13. Anne of Denmark
3. Henrietta of England
14. Henry IV of France (= 8)
7. Henrietta Maria of France
15. Marie de' Medici (= 9)
