= Philippe I, Duke of Orléans =

French prince (1640–1701)

Philippe I
- Duke of Orléans
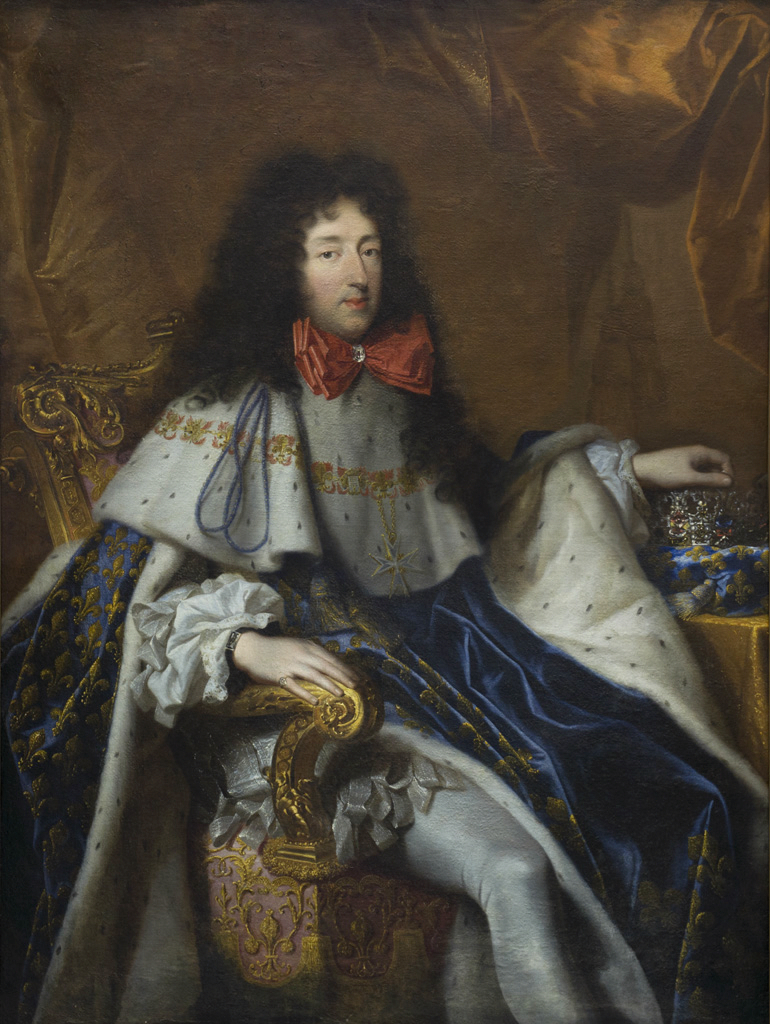
- Portrait by Pierre Mignard
- Born: Philippe, Duke of Anjou; 21 September 1640; Château de Saint-Germain-en-Laye, Kingdom of France
- Died: 9 June 1701 (aged 60); Château de Saint-Cloud, Kingdom of France
- Burial: 21 June 1701; Basilica of St Denis, France
- Spouses: Henrietta of England (m. 1661; died 1670) Elizabeth Charlotte of the Palatinate (m. 1671)
- Issue more...: Marie Louise, Queen of Spain; Philippe Charles, Duke of Valois; Anne Marie, Queen of Sardinia; Philippe II, Duke of Orléans; Élisabeth Charlotte, Duchess of Lorraine
- House: Bourbon (by birth); Orléans (founder)
- Father: Louis XIII
- Mother: Anne of Austria

Philippe I, Duke of Orléans (21 September 1640 – 9 June 1701), was the younger son of King Louis XIII of France and Anne of Austria, and the younger brother of King Louis XIV. He was the founder of the House of Orléans, a cadet branch of the ruling House of Bourbon.

Styled Duke of Anjou from birth, Philippe became Duke of Orléans upon the death of his uncle Gaston in 1660. He was also granted the dukedoms of Valois, Chartres and Nemours. Known as le Petit Monsieur or simply Monsieur, Philippe was a distinguished military commander and took part in the War of Devolution and the Franco-Dutch War, the latter of which saw his victory over William of Orange at the Battle of Cassel. Through careful personal administration, he greatly augmented the fortunes of the House of Orléans, which came to rival that of the Bourbons.

Throughout his life, Philippe was open about his preference for male lovers, most notably the Chevalier de Lorraine, and freely acted with effeminacy. He married twice, first to Henrietta of England and then to Elizabeth Charlotte of the Palatinate. The two daughters of his first marriage, Marie Louise and Anne Marie, became queens consort of Spain and Sardinia, respectively, while his son Philippe II served as regent of France from 1715 to 1723.

== Early years ==
=== Birth ===
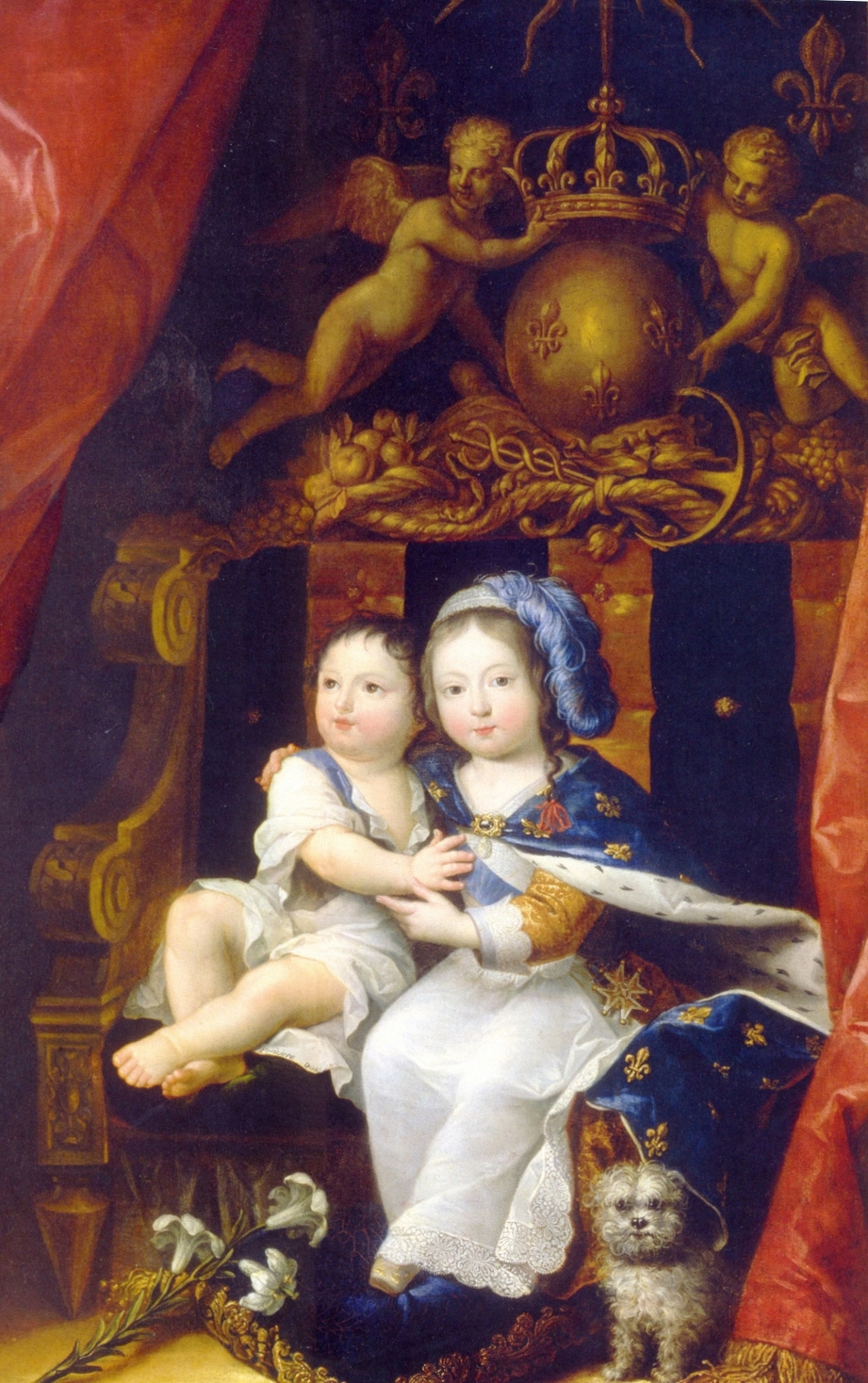
Philippe and his elder brother, the future Louis XIV, by an unknown painter

Philippe de Bourbon was born on 21 September 1640 at the Château de Saint-Germain-en-Laye in the town of Saint-Germain-en-Laye, France, the day before his mother Anne's 39th birthday. As the son of a ruling king, the infant Philippe held the rank of a Fils de France (son of France). As such, he ranked immediately behind his older brother Louis, Dauphin of France, who inherited the French throne before Philippe reached the age of three. From his birth until the birth of his brother's first son, Philippe was second in line to the throne of France and he was entitled to the style of Royal Highness.

Philippe was born in the presence of his father Louis XIII, the Princess of Condé, and the Duchess of Vendôme, prominent members of the Bourbon dynasty. Philippe's cousin, Anne Marie Louise d'Orléans, noted in her memoirs that the child's birth was marked by celebratory cannons in Paris. An hour after his birth, he was baptised in a private ceremony by Dominique Séguier, Bishop of Meaux, and given the name Philippe. Louis XIII had wanted to give the infant the title Count of Artois in honour of a recent French victory in Arras within the county of Artois. However, Louis respected tradition and gave him the title of Duke of Anjou instead, a title commonly granted to the younger sons of French kings since the fourteenth century. After his baptism, Philippe was put in the care of Françoise de Souvré, marquise de Lansac, who also looked after his older brother, in 1643 succeeded by Marie-Catherine de Senecey.

=== Le Petit Monsieur ===
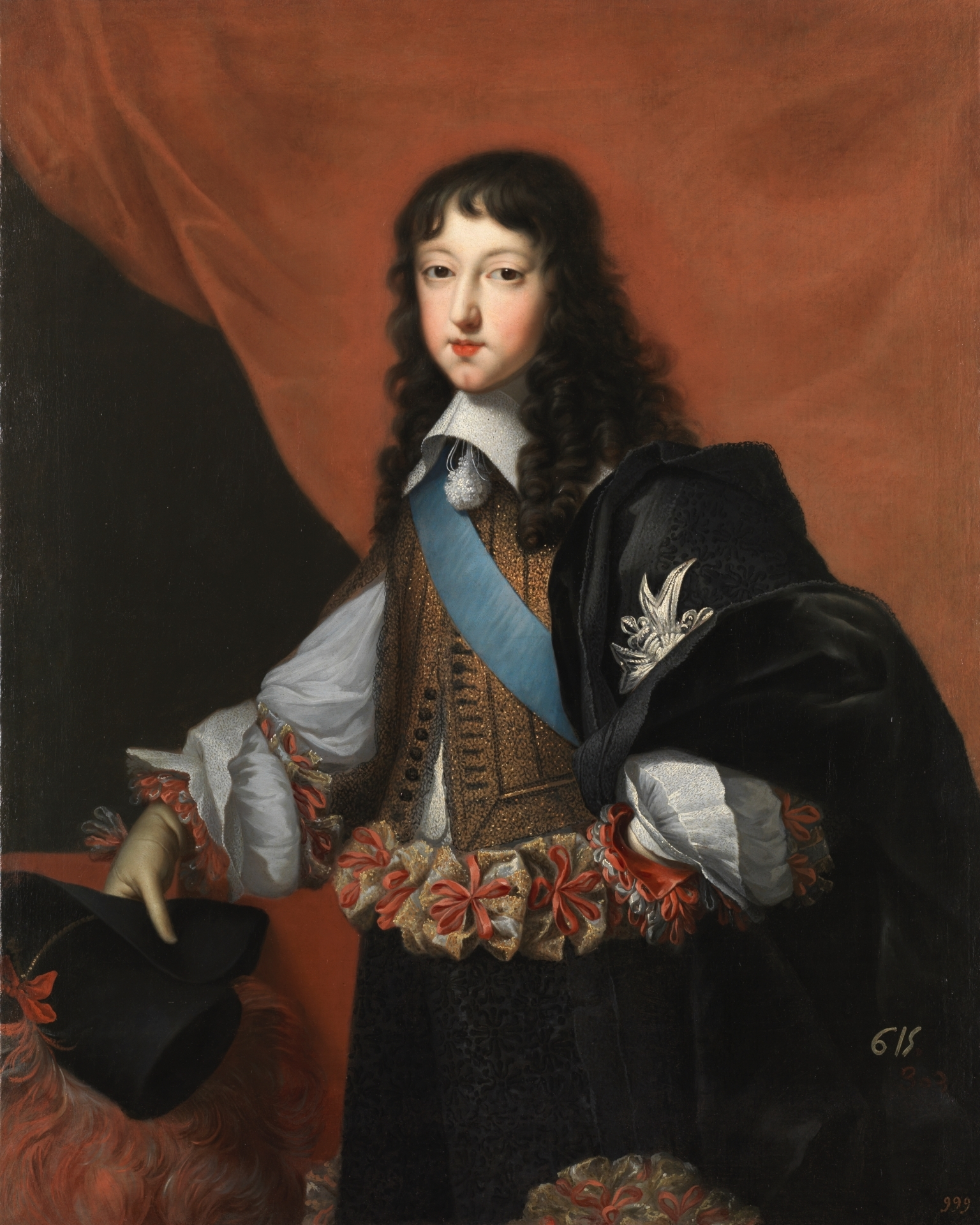
Portrait sent by Anne of Austria to her brother, Philip IV, c. 1650 by Jean Nocret

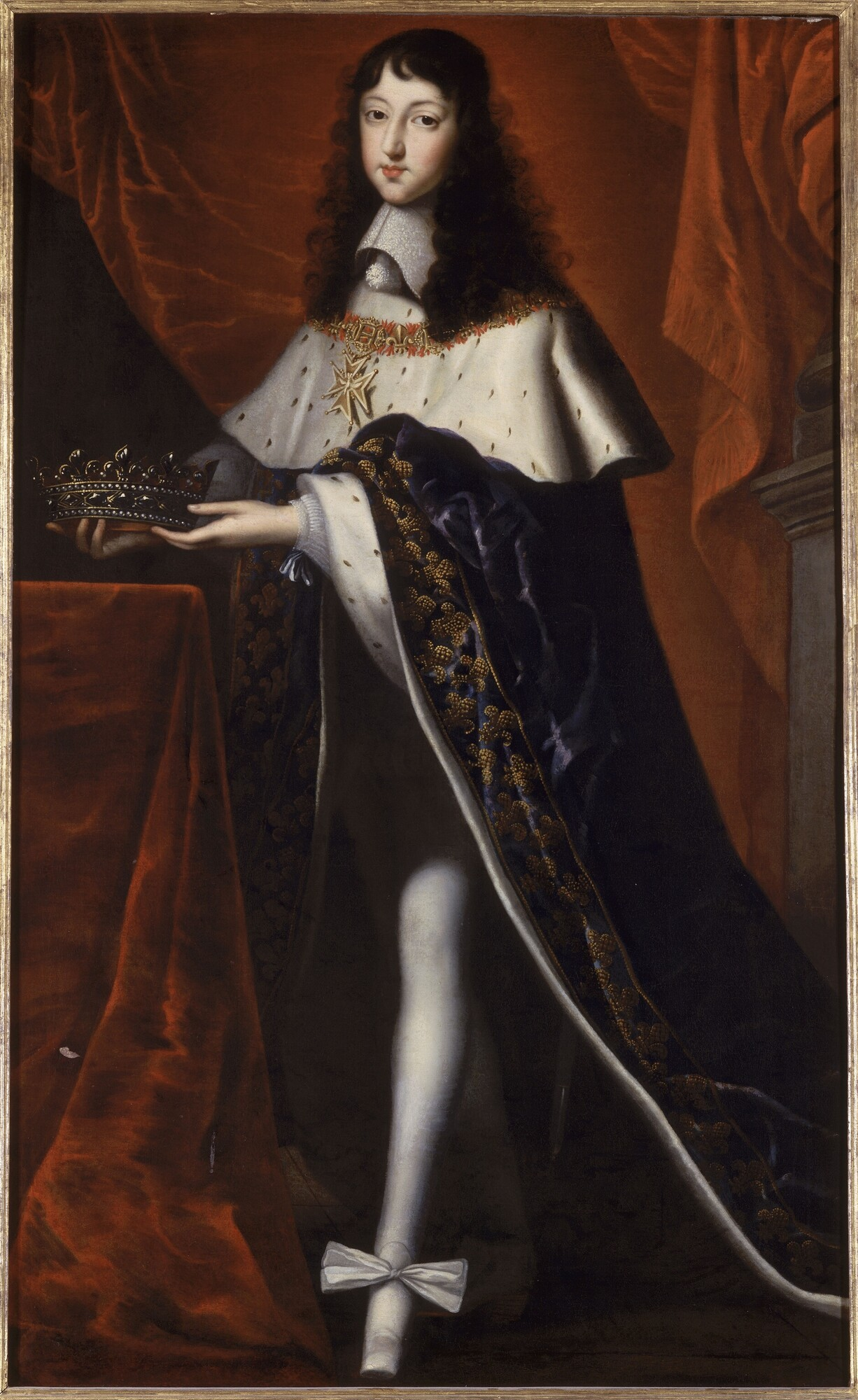
Philippe dressed for his brother's coronation, c. 1654 by an unknown artist

At the death of their father Louis XIII in May 1643, Philippe's older brother ascended to the throne of France as Louis XIV. Their mother Queen Anne revoked the late king's will to arrange for a power-sharing agreement with Cardinal Mazarin, who had been serving as Louis XIII's chief minister. Anne was now in full control of her children, something she had been vying for since their birth. As the younger brother of the king, Philippe was addressed as le Petit Monsieur, since his uncle Gaston, who had also been the younger brother of a French king, was still alive. Gaston was then known as le Grand Monsieur. It was not until 1660 at the death of Gaston that Philippe would be known simply as Monsieur or as the Duke of Orléans.

The child Philippe was acknowledged to be attractive, affectionate, and intelligent. The Duchess of Montpensier dubbed him the "prettiest child in the world", while his mother's friend and confidant, Madame de Motteville, later said of Philippe that he displayed a "lively intelligence" early on. From 1646 on Philippe spent some of his childhood at the Hôtel de Villeroy ("Cremerie de Paris"), house of Nicolas de Villeroy, tutor of his brother Louis XIV. The children played there with Catherine de Villeroy and François de Villeroy.

In the autumn of 1647, at age seven, Philippe caught smallpox, but recovered and convalesced at the Palais-Royal. A year later, he was taken from the care of women and, on 11 May 1648 carried out his first official ceremony when the ceremonies omitted during his baptism were performed at the Palais-Royal. His godparents were his uncle Gaston and aunt Queen Henrietta Maria of England. Later, he was placed in the care of François de La Mothe Le Vayer and the Abbé de Choisy. He was also educated by the maréchal du Plessis-Praslin. His tutors were chosen by Cardinal Mazarin, who was created the superintendent of the prince's education by his mother. His education emphasized languages, history, literature, mathematics and dancing. Despite having a household of his own, his behavior was closely watched by his mother and Mazarin, who made sure that Philippe had no meaningful financial freedom from the crown.

When Philippe was eight, the civil war known as the Fronde began in France. It lasted until 1653 in its two main phases: the Fronde Parlementaire (1648–1649) and the Fronde des nobles (1650–1653). During the conflict, the royal family was obliged to flee Paris on the night of 9 February 1651 for the safety of Saint-Germain-en-Laye in order to avoid a revolt by the nobility against Mazarin. When peace returned, the decision was made for Philippe to move his household to the Palais des Tuileries, previously the residence of the duchess of Montpensier opposite the Palais-Royal. At the coronation of Louis XIV on 7 June 1654, Philippe acted as dean, placing the Crown of Charlemagne on his brother's head. All his life, Philippe would be a noted lover of etiquette and panoply, ensuring that all ceremonial details were adhered to.

In late June 1658, Louis became gravely ill. Presumed to have typhoid, Louis was almost pronounced dead when, in mid-July, he began to recover. The illness made Philippe, heir presumptive to the throne, the center of attention. For fear of infection, Philippe could not see his brother. During the crisis, Queen Anne became closer to her younger son, showing him more affection. After Louis's recovery, Philippe was once again left to his own devices. Later in 1658, Philippe made his most significant purchase, the Château de Saint-Cloud, a building about 10 kilometers west of Paris. On 8 October 1658, its proprietor Barthélemy Hervart organized a sumptuous feast at the château in honor of the royal family. Some two weeks later, on 25 October, Philippe bought the estate for 240,000 livres. He immediately began to organize improvements to what was then a small villa.

== Duke of Orléans ==
When Philippe's uncle Gaston died in February 1660, the Duchy of Orléans reverted to the crown, as he had no surviving male issue. The duchy was one of the most highly regarded appanages of the ancien régime, and it was traditionally Philippe's birthright as the eldest (and only) younger brother of the king. Thus, at the death of Gaston, Philippe himself took on the new style of Duke of Orléans and Louis XIV granted Philippe the title officially on 10 May 1661 along with the subsidiary titles duke of Valois and duke of Chartres, all registered peerages with the Parlement of Paris. He was also granted the lordship of Montargis.

In order to discourage the type of tempestuous relationship that had developed between Louis XIII and his younger brother Gaston, Anne of Austria and Cardinal Mazarin made it a private policy to prevent Philippe from pursuing ambitions which might prompt rivalry with or defiance of the king. Aside from his appanage, he was given no meaningful financial freedom from the Crown. Later, to his already rich holdings Philippe wanted to add the countship of Blois, with its Château de Chambord, and the governorship of Languedoc, but both would be refused to him by his brother.

== Marriages and love life ==
=== Sexuality ===
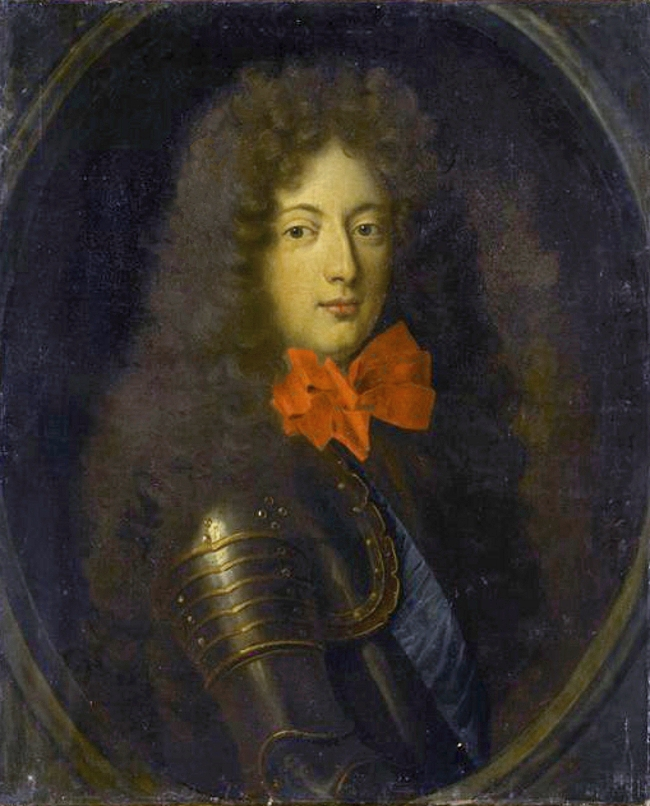
Portrait of the Chevalier de Lorraine by unknown artist

During his childhood, Queen Anne was observed to address Philippe by such nicknames as "my little girl" and encouraged him to dress in feminine clothing, even as a young man—a habit he would retain all his life. A contemporary would later call him the "silliest woman who ever lived", a reference to his effeminacy. As a young man, Philippe would dress up and attend balls and parties in female attire, for example, dressed as a shepherdess. Mindful that Gaston's treasonous habits had not only been evoked by the Fronde, but by his secret elopement with a foreign princess which had left the royal brothers estranged for years, Philippe's same-sex relationships, occasional cross-dressing, and other behaviors regarded at the time as unconventional, were tolerated at court. Some scholars have suggested that these traits were viewed as diminishing any political threat he might otherwise have posed to his elder brother, the king. It appears that 1658 was the year in which Philippe's sexuality became well defined. Court gossip said that Cardinal Mazarin's own nephew Philippe Jules Mancini, the Duke of Nevers, had been the "first to [have] corrupted" Philippe in what was referred to as the "Italian vice"—contemporary slang for male homosexuality. Philippe certainly did make his first contacts that year with Philippe de Lorraine, known as the Chevalier de Lorraine, the lover with whom he would establish the closest emotional attachment throughout his life.

Even once married, he reportedly carried on open romantic affairs with German nobles, with no regard to either of his two wives. Philippe's favorites, invariably younger, handsome men, dominated contemporary and historical commentaries about his role at court, as had the mignons of Henry III. Philippe was infatuated with the famously arrogant Armand de Gramont, Comte de Guiche. There were also rumors at court that Philippe in fact had a mistress and had shown an interest in the Duchess of Mercœur, Mazarin's niece. Another lover of Philippe at this time was Antoine Coëffier de Ruzé, the Marquis d'Effiat. The latter had entered Philippe's life as captain of the chase and stayed in his household until Philippe's death.

As greedy as a vulture, this cadet of the French branch of the House of Lorraine had, by the end of the 1650s, hooked Monsieur like a harpooned whale. The young prince loved him with a passion that worried Madame Henrietta and the court bishop, Cosnac, but it was plain to the King that, thanks to the attractive face and sharp mind of the good-looking chevalier, he would have his way with his brother.

— Excerpt from Dirk Van der Cruysse's Madame Palatine, princesse européenne

Among the lovers, one man stands out, Philippe of Lorraine-Armagnac, the never-married Chevalier de Lorraine, who was described as "insinuating, brutal and devoid of scruple". As a member of the House of Guise, ranking as a prince étranger, Philippe could keep him near while at court and promote him within his own household without initially evoking scandal or offending sensibilities. In January 1670, Philippe's wife prevailed upon the king to imprison the chevalier, first near Lyon, then in the Mediterranean island-fortress of Château d'If. Finally, he was banished to Rome. However, by February, the Duke of Orléans' protests and pleas persuaded the king to restore him to his brother's entourage.

=== Marriage with Princess Henrietta of England ===
After Louis XIV's marriage to Maria Theresa of Spain on 9 June 1660, Queen Anne turned her attention to the marriage of Philippe. He had previously been encouraged to court his older cousin, Anne Marie Louise d'Orléans, Duchess of Montpensier, eldest daughter of Gaston and his first wife Marie de Bourbon. Known as Mademoiselle at this time, she had an immense private fortune and had previously rejected suitors such as Charles II of England. Born in 1627, she was the sole heiress of her mother, who died in childbirth. Mademoiselle declined the union, complaining that Philippe always stayed near his mother "like a child". Mademoiselle instead remained unmarried. Philippe would marry instead another first cousin, Princess Henrietta of England, youngest child of King Charles I of England and his wife Henrietta Maria of France, who was Philippe's paternal aunt and had taken refuge at the court of France after the birth of Princess Henrietta in 1644. They lived at the Palais-Royal and at the Palais du Louvre. In 1660, after the restoration of the House of Stuart to the throne of England under her brother Charles II, Princess Henrietta returned to England to visit her sister, the Princess of Orange, who later caught smallpox and died. The French court officially asked for Henrietta's hand on behalf of Philippe on 22 November 1660 while she was in England.

The couple signed their marriage contract at the Palais-Royal on 30 March 1661. The ceremony took place the next day in the same building in front of select members of the court. The dowry promised was a hefty 840,000 livres. Known as Henriette d'Angleterre in France, and Minette to her intimates, she was known officially as Madame and was ever popular with the court. Court gossip later said that the king was the father of Henrietta's first child. Henrietta's very open flirting is said to have caused a jealous Philippe to retaliate by beginning to flaunt his sexuality openly in a less-than-accepting era. Henrietta's flirting with the king started early in the summer of 1661 while the newlyweds were staying at the Palace of Fontainebleau for the summer. Philippe complained to his mother about the intimacy that Louis and Henrietta displayed, which led Queen Anne to reprimand both son and daughter-in-law. Relations were further strained when Henrietta allegedly seduced Philippe's old lover, the Comte de Guiche.

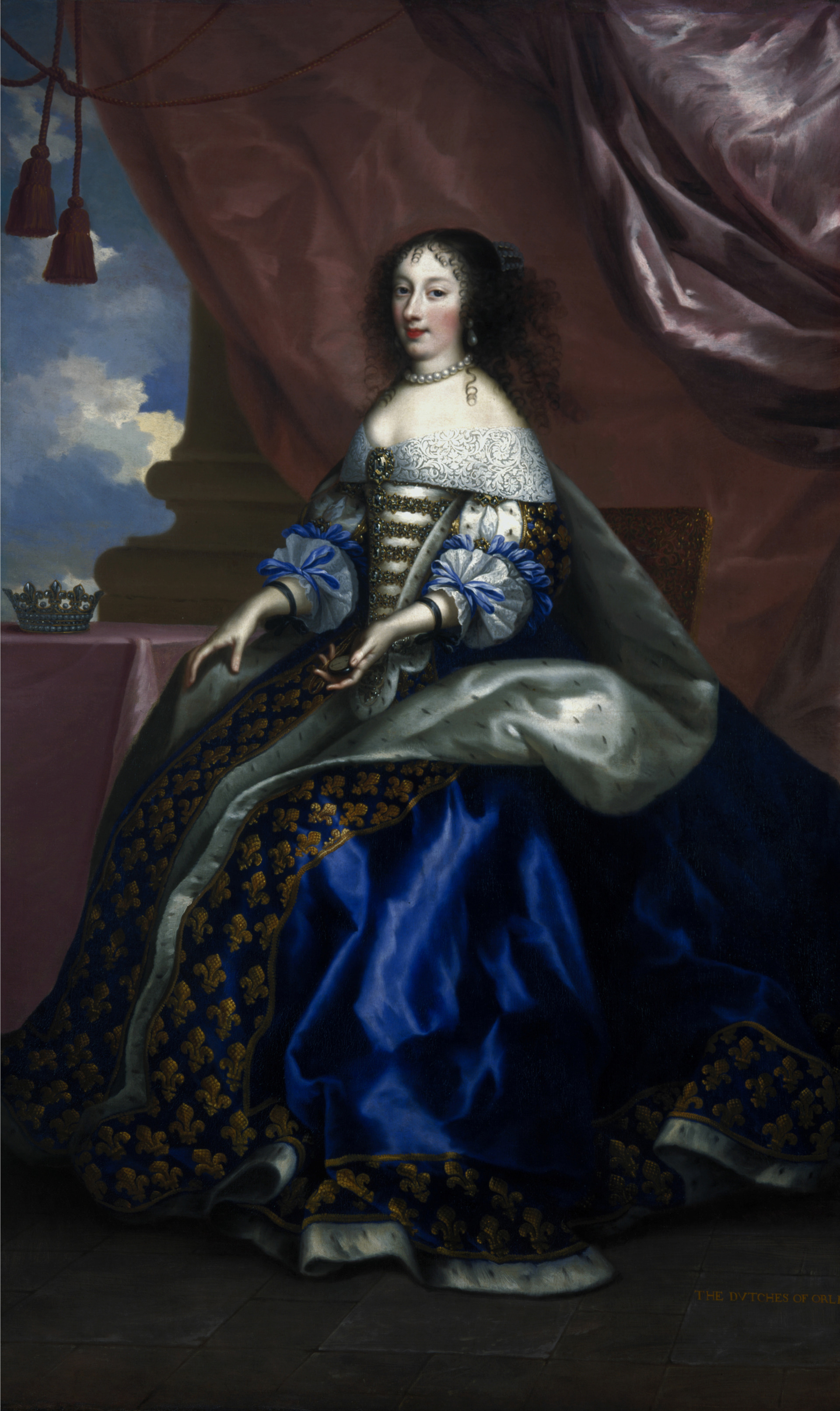
Philippe's first wife Princess Henrietta of England in the 1660s by Jean Nocret. She was described as a "springtime beauty".

The couple moved from the Tuileries in early 1662 to the Palais-Royal. Later in March of the same year, Philippe became a father when Henrietta gave birth to their daughter Marie Louise, the future wife of Charles II of Spain. Henrietta's disappointment at the birth of a daughter was great, and she even remarked that she should "throw her into the river!" This greatly offended Queen Anne, who adored her first granddaughter. For his part, Philippe would always consider Marie Louise his favourite child. The girl was baptized on 21 May 1662. On the same day Philippe took part in the famous Carrousel du Louvre, where he dressed extravagantly as the King of Persia with the king as the King of the Romans and all ladies of the court in attendance.

In 1664, Henrietta gave birth at Fontainebleau to a son who was given the title Duke of Valois. Philippe wrote to his brother-in-law Charles II of England "that your sister was this morning safely delivered of a fine boy. The child seems to be in excellent health." The child nonetheless died of convulsions in 1666, having been baptized Philippe Charles d'Orléans hours before death. The loss of the little Duke of Valois affected Henrietta greatly. Philippe, however, was anxious to maintain the allowance which his son had received from the king. This death only augmented the grief of a court still in mourning for the death of Queen Anne in January. The previous year, the Comte de Guiche had been exiled from court with Philippe reporting to his mother that Henrietta had had private interviews with the dashing nobleman.

Philippe took part in the War of Devolution in 1667 while Henrietta remained at Saint-Cloud due to her pregnancy. On the field, Philippe took an active part in the trenches at Tournai and Douai and distinguished himself through his valor and coolness under fire. But Philippe later became bored with battle and interested himself more in the decoration of his tent. Hearing that Henrietta was ill due to a miscarriage, he returned to Saint-Cloud, where she was recovering from an ordeal which almost cost her her life. Upon her recovery, Philippe returned to the battlefield and distinguished himself at the Siege of Lille.

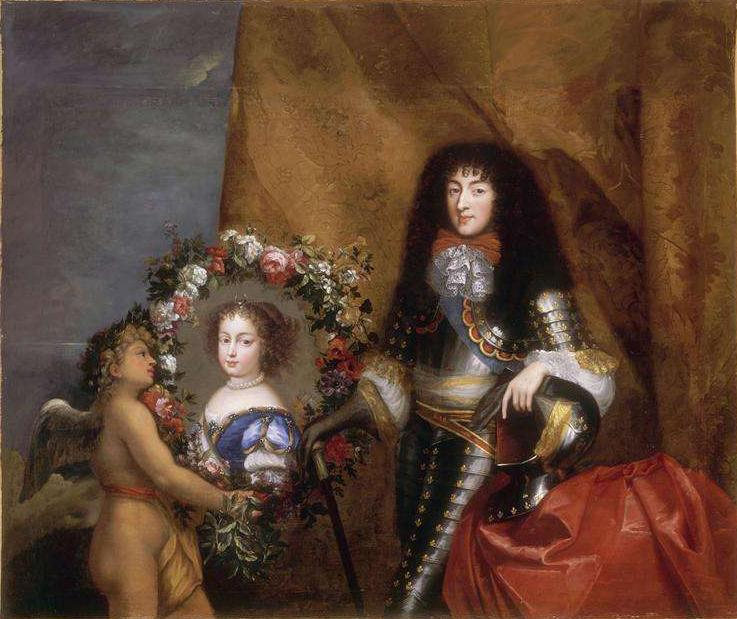
Philippe with a medallion of his favourite daughter Marie Louise, c. 1670, Pierre Mignard

In January 1670, Henrietta prevailed upon the King to imprison the Chevalier de Lorraine, first near Lyon, then in the Mediterranean island-fortress of the Château d'If. He was finally banished to Rome after offending the King and Henrietta by boasting that he could get Philippe to divorce her. In retaliation for the Chevalier's treatment, Philippe withdrew to his estate at Villers-Cotterêts, dragging Henrietta with him. By February, Philippe's protests and pleas persuaded the King to restore the Chevalier to his brother's entourage. The couple had their last child in August 1669, a daughter who was baptized Anne Marie at the private chapel of the Palais-Royal on 8 April 1670.

Henrietta is best known to political historians in France for her part in negotiating the Secret Treaty of Dover, an offensive and defensive treaty between England and France signed at Dover on 1 June 1670. It required France to assist England in her aim to rejoin the Roman Catholic Church and England to assist France in her war of conquest against the Dutch Republic. The Third Anglo-Dutch War was a direct consequence of this treaty. Having returned to France at the end of June 1670, Henrietta had to endure Philippe's blatant spite for her part in the Chevalier's exile and her secret mission to Dover. Despite tense relations, she traveled to Saint-Cloud on 24 June, when she started to complain of pains in her side. Relaxing at Saint-Cloud on 29 June, she collapsed on the terrace at the palace. Taken inside, she was undressed and started to exclaim that she had been poisoned. She subsequently died between the hours of two and three in the morning of 30 June 1670 at the age of 26. An autopsy was performed which found that Henrietta died of peritonitis caused by a perforated ulcer; however, public rumor claimed she had been poisoned by her husband, and, according to Saint-Simon in his memoirs, even the king suspected it at first, but the inquiry he conducted revealed that it was the Chevalier de Lorraine and the Marquis d'Effiat who had poisoned her.

Painting commissioned by Philippe for Saint Cloud, Jean Nocret, 1670

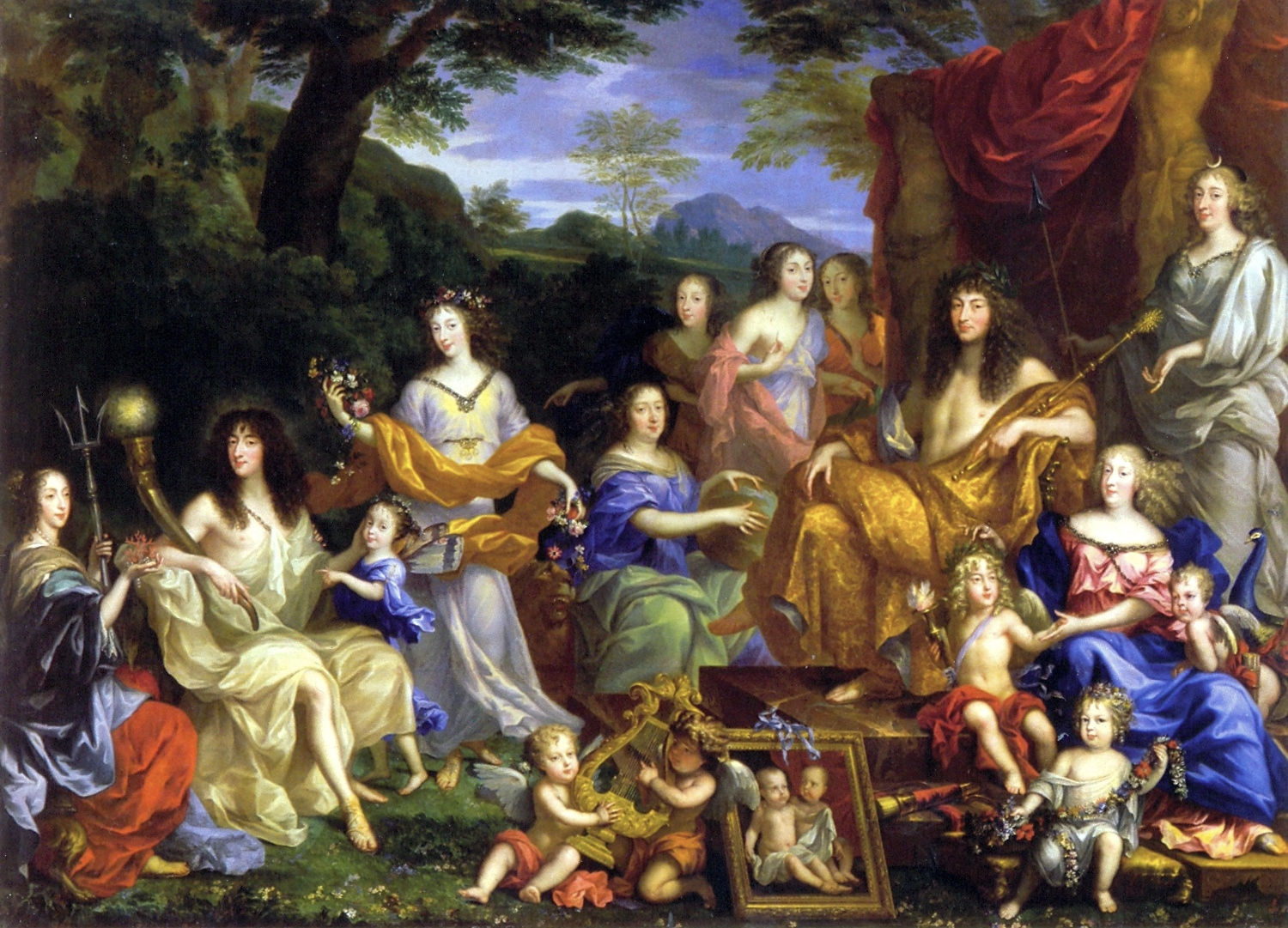
A mural depicting the French royal family in classical garb, commissioned c. 1670 by Philippe: (L–R) Philippe's aunt and mother-in-law, Queen Henrietta Maria of England; Philippe; his daughter, Marie Louise; his wife, Henrietta and his mother, Queen Anne (d. 1666); Philippe's cousins, daughters of his uncle Gaston d'Orléans; his brother, King Louis XIV; his nephew, le Grand Dauphin; his sister-in law, Queen Marie Theresa with her daughter Marie Thérèse, Madame Royale; his nephew, Philippe, Duke of Anjou; standing to the right is his cousin, Anne Marie, la Grande Mademoiselle. The children shown in the framed picture are two deceased daughters of Louis and Marie Therèse.

=== Search for a second bride ===
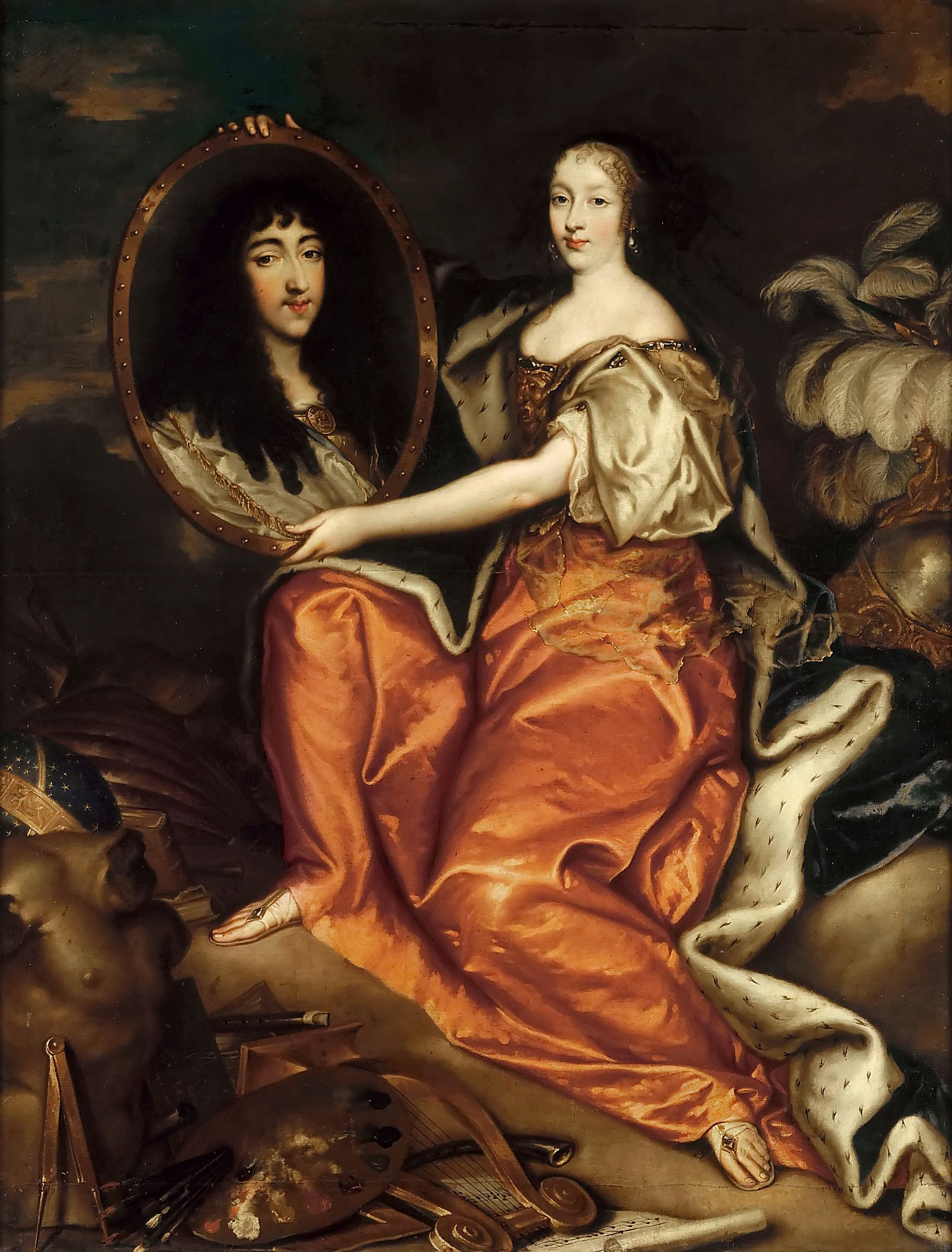
Henrietta as Minerva holding a painting of Monsieur, c. 1665 by Antoine Mathieu

Henrietta was mourned greatly at the court of France, but little by her husband, due to their strained relationship. Louis XIV himself looked for a second wife for Philippe, who was eager to have a male heir to continue the Orléans line. Attention again turned to the duchess of Montpensier, by now known as "la Grande Mademoiselle". Louis himself asked her if she wanted to fill "the vacant place", but she politely declined the offer. Louis rejected many other candidates before settling on the Protestant Princess Elizabeth Charlotte of the Palatinate. Known as Liselotte within her family, she was the only daughter of Charles I Louis, Elector Palatine, and his estranged wife Charlotte of Hesse-Kassel. She was recommended by Anna Gonzaga, a confidante of Philippe's and wife of the bride's uncle, the Prince Palatine Edward. Elizabeth Charlotte had grown up with her aunt Sophia of Hanover due to her parents' bad relationship. Throughout her life she would remain in contact with the Electress Sophia, writing some 50,000 letters that detailed life at the court of France. The Princess Palatine was Henrietta's first cousin once removed, since the latter's father, Charles I of England, was the brother of Elisabeth Charlotte's paternal grandmother, Elizabeth Stuart.

=== Marriage with Princess Palatine Elizabeth Charlotte ===
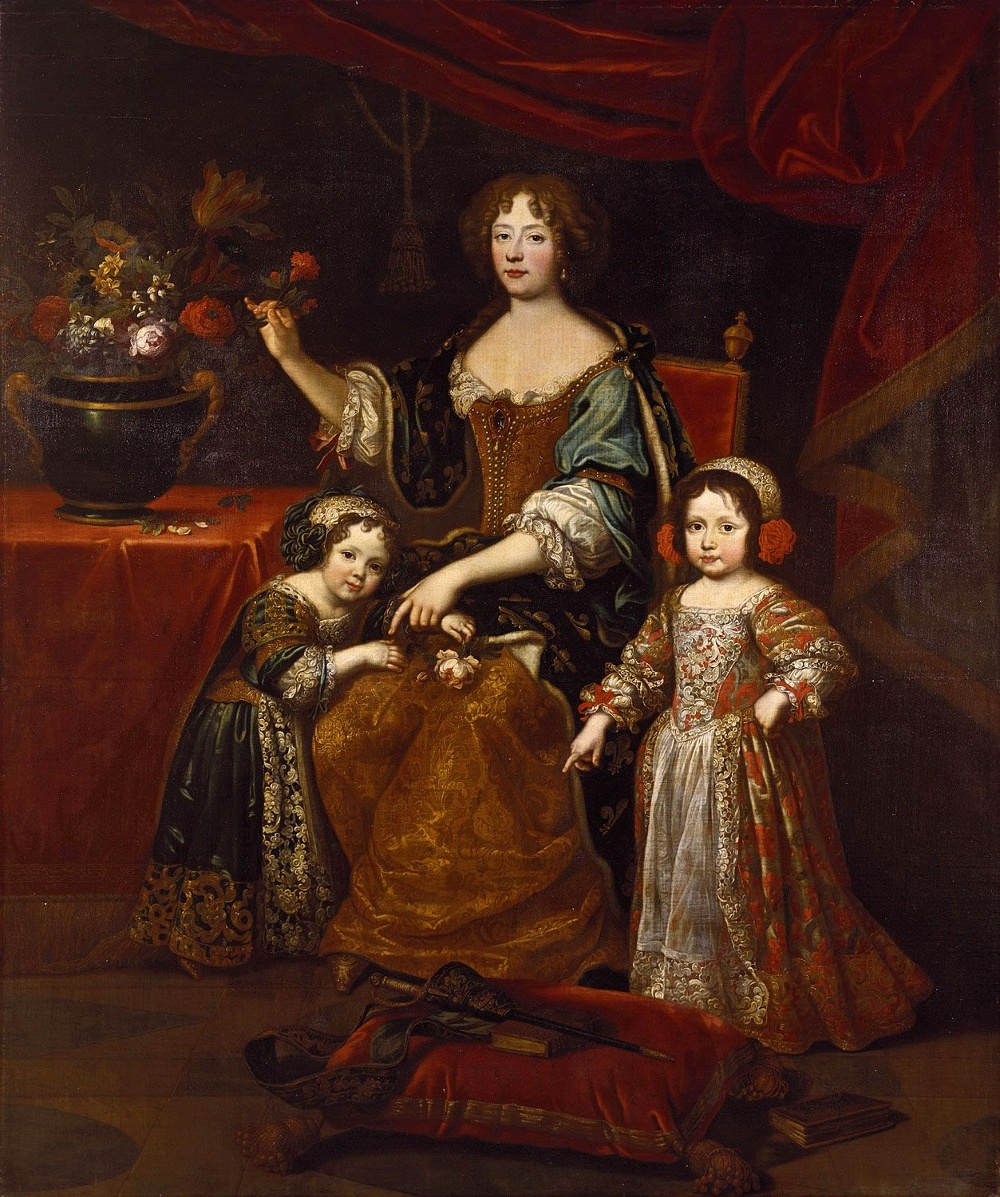
Elizabeth Charlotte with her two children with Philippe, c. 1679 by Pierre Mignard

Philippe married the nineteen-year-old Elizabeth Charlotte, who converted to Roman Catholicism, on 16 November 1671. She was not attractive as Henrietta had been. When Philippe first saw her, he is said to have remarked, "How will I ever be able to sleep with her?" Madame de Sévigné noted how popular the new Madame was with the court. She became renowned for her brusque candor, upright character, and lack of vanity. Her letters record how willingly she gave up sharing Philippe's bed at his request after their children's births.

The couple were very happy in the first years of their marriage. The Chevalier de Lorraine was in Italy, but returned in spring 1672. Pregnant later that year, Elizabeth Charlotte gave birth to a son in June 1673 who was named Alexandre Louis and given the title Duke of Valois. The child died, however, in 1676. A second son, Philippe, followed in 1674, and then a daughter, Élisabeth Charlotte, in 1676, after which the two mutually agreed to sleep in separate beds. Elizabeth Charlotte was praised as being a natural mother. Philippe's second son with Elizabeth Charlotte, known as the Duke of Chartres until he inherited the dukedom of Orléans in 1701, later served as Regent of France during the minority of Louis XV. Elizabeth Charlotte acted as a mother to Philippe's children by Henrietta and maintained correspondence with them until her last days.

== Battle of Cassel ==
Having already established himself as a successful military commander during the War of Devolution in 1667, Philippe was eager to return to the field. In 1676 and 1677 he took part in sieges in Flanders, and was promoted to the rank of lieutenant general, which made him second-in-command to Louis XIV himself.

"The people of Paris went wild with joy. They really love Monsieur. But at court they'd wished he'd lost the battle for the king's sake..."
Extract from the memoirs of Primi Visconti

The most impressive victory won under Philippe's command took place on 11 April 1677: the Battle of Cassel against William III, Prince of Orange, later the king of England and son of Philippe's own first cousin Mary, Princess Royal and Princess of Orange. William decided to relieve some besieged towns; from Ypres he marched with 32,000 men through Poperinge and Oxelaëre in the Cassel Valley. Philippe, who learned of his plans, arranged to meet William's forces at Penebeek between Noordpeene and Zuytpeene. Louis XIV sent him some 25,000 foot-soldiers and 9,000 cavalry from Cambrai under the command of Marshal Luxembourg. By nightfall there were 66,000 soldiers ready for battle. The Dutch attacked the French positions without scouting first. Marshal Luxembourg surprised the Dutch with a cavalry attack that practically destroyed three battalions and routed William's army. In all, casualties on both sides amounted to 4,200 dead and 7,000 wounded. Philippe was hailed for his skill as a military commander, much to the annoyance of his brother, the king. He was presumably jealous of Philippe's growing popularity at court as well as on the battlefield. In honor of his victory at Cassel, Philippe set up a Barnabite College in Paris. The campaign marked the end of his military career; he soon immersed himself once again in a life of pleasure.

== Cultural expansion and property ==
From the time of the victory at Cassel until the 1690s, Philippe mainly concentrated his energies on the expansion of his estates, personal fortune, and art collection, including the renovation of his residences, the Palais-Royal and the Château de Saint-Cloud. The latter was his favorite residence, the home of an ever-expanding and "stormy" court. Philippe became an important patron of the artists Jean Nocret and Pierre Mignard, both of whom were employed to elaborate the décor at Saint-Cloud and the Palais-Royal. As early as 1660, Philippe also ordered Antoine Lepautre to begin extensions at Saint-Cloud; later he became contrôleur général of Philippe's properties.

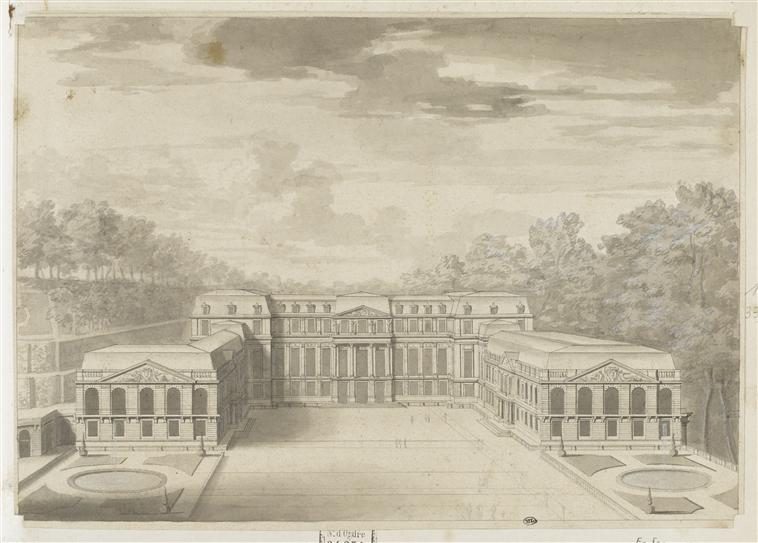
The Château de Saint Cloud c. 1677

Following Lepautre's death in 1679, work on Saint-Cloud was continued by his executive assistant Jean Girard in collaboration with Thomas Gobert. Later on, Philippe sought Jules Hardouin-Mansart to design a grand staircase in the left wing in the manner of the Ambassadors' Staircase at Versailles. The gardens were redesigned by André Le Nôtre, while the basin and lowermost canal were added by Mansart in 1698. At the time of Philippe's death in 1701, the estate of Saint-Cloud covered some 1,200 acres (4.9 km^{2}). Saint-Cloud remained with the Orléans family until 1785, when Philippe's great-grandson Louis Philippe d'Orléans sold it to Marie Antoinette, Philippe's great-granddaughter, for the sum of six million livres.

Minor improvements at the Palais-Royal began in 1661 at the time of Philippe's marriage to Henrietta, but the property was part of the crown holdings, and had not been used officially for years. Philippe was limited in what he could do to renovate the building until it was given to him in 1692. Philippe again turned to Mansart for assistance in modernizing it. The interior décor was entrusted to Antoine Coypel, whose father Noël Coypel had previously worked at the palace.

Philippe not only enjoyed architecture and court society, but also music and dancing; he was in fact famed for his exceptional dancing abilities. Philippe was a patron of musicians such as Jean-Henri d'Anglebert, Henri Dumont, Jacques-Antoine Arlaud and Marie Aubry, many of whom would stay part of his son's household after his death in 1701. Jean-Baptiste Lully was also a protégé of Philippe after he left Mademoiselle's household. Philippe's small art collection created the basis for the Orleans Collection, one of the most important art collections ever assembled.

With the permission of the Parlement of Paris, Philippe sponsored projects to help maintain his estates and enhance their profitability. From 1679, he was granted the right to build the Canal d'Orléans, a large canal that connected the River Loire at Orléans to a junction with the Canal du Loing and the Canal de Briare in the village of Buges near Montargis. As the largest canal built in France since Philippe's grandfather Henry IV built the Canal de Briare in 1604, its construction was considered an engineering feat. The canal, used to transport goods from Orléans to Paris, was a great success in its time and is still used widely today. Philippe's careful investment and management of his various estates made him a wealthy man in his own right, and his fortune was augmented considerably at the death of his cousin Mademoiselle in 1693. Philippe is acknowledged as being not only the biological founder of the House of Orléans, but as financial founder of a family whose wealth would come to rival that of the main line of the House of Bourbon.

== Later years ==
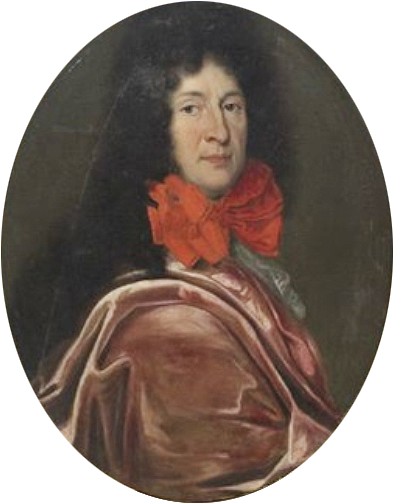
Later portrait c. 1695 after Hyacinthe Rigaud

Upon the death of Mademoiselle in 1693, Philippe acquired the dukedoms of Montpensier, Châtellerault, Saint-Fargeau and Beaupréau. He also became prince of Joinville, count of Dourdan, Mortain and Bar-sur-Seine and viscount of Auge and Domfront. In later life, Philippe was thus able to maintain his lavish lifestyle easily, and he found much satisfaction in the activities of his children and grandchildren. Both of his daughters by his first wife Henrietta married influential European sovereigns, eventually becoming queens, and his son the Duke of Chartres pursued an active and distinguished military career, having served at the Battle of Steenkerque in 1692 as well as the Siege of Namur, much to his father's pride. As he had with Philippe, Louis XIV was careful to limit the power of Chartres.

"I won Monsieur over during the last three years of his life. We even used to laugh together about his weaknesses... He had confidence in me and always took my side, but before that I used to suffer dreadfully. I was just beginning to be happy when the Almighty took poor Monsieur from me"
Elizabeth Charlotte of the Palatinate writing in 1716 to the Princess of Wales regarding their mutual affection in the later years of their marriage

In 1696, Philippe's granddaughter Marie-Adélaïde came to the French court from Italy for her marriage to Louis, Duke of Burgundy, who was third in line to the throne. The two were married in 1697 and became the parents of Louis XV. In 1701, Chartres was denied a position on the front in the War of the Spanish Succession, which began that year. This slight was the source of great bitterness on the part of both father and son after. The pretext seems to have been the behavior of Chartres in parading his mistress Mademoiselle de Séry in view of his wife. On 8 June 1701, Louis XIV and Philippe met at the Château de Marly to dine together. At first meeting, Louis XIV attacked Philippe about Chartres' conduct with Mademoiselle de Séry. Philippe responded by reprimanding Louis for similar conduct with his own mistresses during his marriage to Queen Marie Thérèse, adding that Chartres had still not received the favors promised to him for having married the King's legitimized daughter, Françoise Marie. Nonetheless, the announcement of dinner halted the argument, and the brothers sat down to dine.

Philippe angrily returned to Saint-Cloud early the same evening to dine with his son. Philippe collapsed onto his son after suffering a fatal stroke at noon on 9 June 1701 at the age of sixty. Louis XIV, upon hearing his only sibling had died, said "I cannot believe I will never see my brother again." The Duchess of Burgundy, his granddaughter, was likewise distraught, avowing that she "had loved Monsieur very much". Philippe's heart was taken to the Val-de-Grâce convent on 14 June, and his body was taken on 21 June to the Basilica of St Denis, where it remained until the French Revolution, at which time the basilica was desecrated and all graves destroyed.

Worried that she would be put in a convent, a stipulation of her marriage contract in the event of Philippe's death, Elizabeth Charlotte was assured by the king that she could remain at court as long as she wished. She burnt all the letters of Philippe's lovers through the years, lest they fall into "the wrong hands", observing that the scent of the perfumed letters nauseated her. Louis XIV assured the new Duke of Orléans, formerly the Duke of Chartres, that the past was forgotten and that henceforth he was to look on him as his father. The court was devastated, and his old friend, Louis XIV's discarded mistress Madame de Montespan, was also greatly affected, the two having been very close. The widowed Elizabeth Charlotte continued to write frequently to her daughter and stepdaughter and to her friends, the fellow German princesses the Duchess of Modena and the Princess of Wales. She herself died at Saint-Cloud in December 1722, and was also buried at Saint-Denis.

== Portrayals in media ==
Philippe has been portrayed in various modern media:

- The Private Life of Louis XIV (1935 film), played by Hans Stüwe
- Angélique, the Marquise of the Angels (1956 novel) by Anne Golon and Serge Golon
- Angélique, Marquise des Anges (1964 film), played by Robert Porte
- Marvelous Angelique (1965 film), played by Robert Porte
- Liselotte of the Palatinate (1966 film), played by Harald Leipnitz
- The Taking of Power by Louis XIV (1966 film), played by Pierre Pernet
- Marquise (1997 film), played by Franck de La Personne
- Vatel (2000 film), played by Murray Lachlan Young
- Charles II: The Power and the Passion (2003 mini-series), played by Cyrille Thouvenin
- Le Roi Soleil (2005 musical), played by Christophe Maé
- A Little Chaos (2015 film), played by Stanley Tucci
- Versailles (2015 TV series), played by Alexander Vlahos

== Issue ==
Philippe's coat of arms from 1660 until his death: Azure, three fleur-de-lis Or, differenced by a label Argent

=== First marriage ===
Married his first cousin, Princess Henrietta of England, daughter of Charles I of England and Henrietta Maria of France, on 31 March 1661, at the Palais-Royal. The couple had three children, in addition to four miscarriages and one stillbirth:

1. Marie Louise d'Orléans (26 March 1662 – 12 February 1689) married Charles II of Spain, no issue
2. Miscarriage (1663)
3. Philippe Charles d'Orléans, Duke of Valois (16 July 1664 – 8 December 1666) died in infancy
4. Stillborn daughter (9 July 1665)
5. Miscarriage (1666)
6. Miscarriage (1667)
7. Miscarriage (1668)
8. Anne Marie d'Orléans (27 August 1669 – 26 August 1728) married Victor Amadeus II, Duke of Savoy (future king of Sardinia) and had issue

=== Second marriage ===
Married Elizabeth Charlotte of the Palatinate, daughter of Charles I Louis, Elector Palatine and Charlotte of Hesse-Kassel, on 16 November 1671 at Châlons. The couple had three children:

1. Alexandre Louis d'Orléans, Duke of Valois (2 June 1673 – 16 March 1676) died in childhood;
2. Philippe II, Duke of Orléans (2 August 1674 – 2 December 1723) married Françoise Marie de Bourbon, Légitimée de France, and had issue;
3. Élisabeth Charlotte d'Orléans (13 September 1676 – 24 December 1744) married Leopold, Duke of Lorraine, and had issue.

== Ancestors ==
Ancestors of Philippe of France

8. Antoine of Navarre
4. Henry IV of France
9. Jeanne III of Navarre
2. Louis XIII of France
10. Francesco I de' Medici, Grand Duke of Tuscany
5. Marie de' Medici
11. Joanna of Austria
1. Philippe of France, Duke of Orléans
12. Philip II of Spain
6. Philip III of Spain
13. Anna of Austria
3. Anne of Austria
14. Charles II, Archduke of Inner Austria
7. Margaret of Austria
15. Maria Anna of Bavaria

== See also ==
- Descendants of Philippe I, Duke of Orléans
- Antoine II Coëffier de Ruzé

== Sources ==
- Anselme de Sainte-Marie, Père (1726). Histoire généalogique et chronologique de la maison royale de France [Genealogical and chronological history of the royal house of France] (in French). Vol. 1 (3rd ed.). Paris: La compagnie des libraires.
- Anthony, Louisa (1852). Footsteps to history, being an epitome of the histories of England and France, from the fifth to the nineteenth century.
- Barker, Nancy Nichols (1989). Brother to the Sun King, Philippe, Duke of Orléans. Johns Hopkins University Press. ISBN 9780801837913.
- Buckley, Veronica (2008). Madame de Maintenon: The secret wife of Louis XIV. London: Bloomsbury Publishing. ISBN 978-0747580980.
- Cartwright, Julia (1900). Madame: A life of Henrietta, daughter of Charles I and Duchess of Orléans. London: Seeley and Co. Ltd.
- Chisholm, Hugh, ed. (1911). "Orleans, Philip I., Duke of" . Encyclopædia Britannica. Vol. 20 (11th ed.). Cambridge University Press. p. 286.
- Cooke Taylor, William (1849). Memoirs of the house of Orléans: Volume 1. R. Bentley.
- Crompton, Louis (2006). Homosexuality & Civilization. Harvard University Press. ISBN 0-674-02233-5.
- Dufresne, Claude (1991). Les Orléans. Paris: Criterion.
- Erlanger, Philippe: Louis XIV, translated from French by Stephen Cox, Praeger Publishers, New York, 1970
- Fraser, Antonia (2006). Love and Louis XIV: The Women in the Life of the Sun King. London: Anchor Books. ISBN 978-0-7538-2293-7.
- Gerard, Kent; Hekma, Gert (1989). The Pursuit of Sodomy: Male Homosexuality in Renaissance and Enlightenment Europe. Routledge. ISBN 978-0-86656-491-5.
- Lynn, John (1999). The Wars of Louis XIV, 1667–1714. New York: Longman. ISBN 0-582-05629-2.
- Kleinman, Ruth (1985). Anne of Austria: Queen of France. University of California: Ohio State University Press. p. 279. ISBN 9780814203897.
- Mitford, Nancy (1966). The Sun King. London: Penguin Publishing. ISBN 0-14-023967-7.
- Pevitt, Christine (1997). The Man Who Would be King:The Life of Philippe d'Orléans, Regent of France. Weidenfeld & Nicolson History. ISBN 9780753804599.
- Sackville-West, Vita (1959). Daughter of France: The life of Anne Marie Louise d'Orléans, duchesse de Montpensier 1627–1693. London: Michael Joseph.
- Saint-Albin, Philippe de:Palais de Saint-Cloud, résidence impériale, Paris, 1864
- Stokes, Hugh (1913). A Prince of Pleasure: Philip of France and His Court, 1640-1701. University of Virginia: H. Jenkins, Limited. ISBN 1230222510.
- Van der Cruysse, Dirk (1988). Madame Palatine, princesse européenne (in French). Fayard. ISBN 978-2-213-02200-0.
- Vatout, Jean (1830). Histoire du Palais-royal. Paris.
- Williams, H. Noel (1909). A Rose of Savoy, Marie Adelaide of Savoy, duchesse de Bourgogne, Mother of Louis XV. New York: Scribner's.

Philippe I, Duke of Orléans House of Orléans Cadet branch of the House of Bourbon Born: 21 September 1640 Died: 9 June 1701
French nobility
Vacant Title last held by Gaston	Duke of Orléans; 10 May 1661 – 9 June 1701	Succeeded by Philippe II
Vacant Title last held by Gaston	Duke of Chartres; 1661 – 1674	Succeeded by Philippe II
Vacant Title last held by Gaston	Duke of Anjou; 1640 – 1660	Vacant Title next held by Philippe Charles
