= Marie Gigault de Bellefonds =

French writer

- Born: 1624
- Died: 24 June 1706 (aged 81–82); Paris, France
- Occupations: Writer, noblewoman
- Spouse: Pierre de Villars
- Children: 2

Marie Gigault de Bellefonds, Marquise de Villars, (1624 – 24 June 1706), was the wife of the French ambassador and is remembered for her reports that described palace intrigue at the Spanish Court of King Charles II between 1679 and 1681, specifically attempts to promote the standing of the French King Louis XIV in Spain.

== Biography ==
Madame de Villars was born into a noble family in Normandy in 1624. Her father was the Marquis Bernardin Gigault de Bellefonds, Governor of Valognes and her mother was Jeanne Aux-Épaules (circa 1590–1652). She was married in 1651 to Pierre de Villars, Marquis de Villars (1623–1698) who was named an ambassador for King Louis XIV and assigned to Spain in 1679. Through their marriage, Marie Gigault became the Marquise de Villars. They had two sons, Armand (died 1712) and Claude-Louis-Hector (1653–1734) who inherited his father's title, Marquis de Villars.

=== Writings ===
Also known as Marie Gigault de Bellefonds de Villars, Madame de Villars has been called an "ambassadress" to Spain because of her unparalleled access between 1679 and 1681 to the new French-born wife of Charles II, King of Spain. According to Borgognoni, King Louis XIV of France had arranged the marriage of his niece, the young and beautiful Marie Louise d'Orléans, to the Spanish King hoping to bring the two countries closer together. By that time, France and Spain had been at war off and on for many years. As soon as the Marie Louise d'Orléans arrived in Spain, she became fast friends with Madame de Villars and her husband, the French ambassador, who translated for the couple during their wedding ceremonies as neither the King nor his new wife spoke the language of the other.

Pierre de Villars, and his wife were expected to work together to achieve the diplomatic goals of the French king. "In the pre-industrial world, married couples worked cooperatively with the purpose of achieving a specific objective," in this case information gathering and diplomacy.

The letters that Madame de Villars sent from Madrid described difficult palace politics with some actors encouraging the Spanish Queen to carry on meetings with anyone who could speak French (apparently hoping to sow discord with Charles), and others who encouraged the Queen to learn Spanish and quickly adopt the fashions and culture of her new country. The new Queen consort was not yet 18 and had great difficulty making that adjustment and she took advantage of the diplomatic access granted to Madame de Villars so they could spend hours together speaking and singing in French. These arrangements also gave Madame de Villars the opportunity to convey messages privately between the French King and the Spanish Queen. "During the entire decade of 1680, the French embassy sought to make of Queen Marie-Louise a political tool in the service of her uncle [Louis XIV]." During this time the influence wielded by Madame de Villars may have exceeded that of her husband.

In time, Madame de Villars and her husband became alienated from members of the Spanish court, who remained strongly anti-French. According to Borgognoni, "in 1681, the friendship between the Queen and the French ambassadress had become a matter of state" and their influence in court ended. The Villar family soon had to depart Spain.

Madame de Villars died in Paris on 24 June 1706.

=== Surviving reports ===
Many letters that Madame de Villars wrote to the French poet Marie-Angélique de Coulanges and others described dynamic political situations in the Spanish court have survived. Some letters by Madame de Villars were collected and published by Perrin, the same publisher of letters by Madame de Sévigné (1759–1762). Other letters concerned her French contemporaries, Marie-Madeleine de La Fayette (1634–1693) and Claudine de Tencin (1682–1749) and were published in 1805.

=== Noble ancestry ===
On her father's side, Madame de Villars was the daughter of a governor of Valognes and Caen in Normandy, and she was descended on her mother's side from Jeanne aux Épaules to Madeleine de Dreux and the counts of Dreux, the European royal house of the Capetian dynasty in France.

== Works ==
- de Villars, Marie Gigault de Bellefonds. Letters from Madame de Villars to Madame de Coulanges (1679–1681). Paris H. Plon 1868.
- de Villars, Marie Gigault. Letters from Mesdames de Villars, de Coulanges, and LaFayette, Ninon de L'Enclos, and Mlle Aïssé. Flight. 1.1805.
