= Charles-Philippe =

Charles-Philippe is a compound given name which may refer to:

- Charles-Philippe d'Albert, 4th Duke of Luynes (1695–1758), French memoir writer
- Charles Philippe de Croÿ (1549–1613), Marquis of Havré, soldier and politician from the Southern Netherlands
- Prince Charles Philippe, Duke of Nemours (1905–1970)
- Charles Philippe Henri de Noailles (1808–1854), duc (later prince) de Poix and duc de Mouchy
- Charles-Philippe d'Orléans (born 1973), Duke of Anjou
- Charles-Philippe Aubry (died 1770), French soldier and colonial administrator, twice governor of Louisiana
- Charles-Philippe Beaubien (1870–1949), Canadian politician and lawyer
- Charles Philippe de Bosset (1773–1845), Swiss engineer, British Army officer and governor of Cephalonia
- Charles-Philippe de Chennevières-Pointel (1820–1899), French writer and art historian
- Charles-Philippe de Patin (1687–1773), vicomte de Patin, Flemish writer, poet, magistrate and legal and fiscal expert
- Charles Philippe Dieussart (c. 1625–1696), Dutch architect and sculptor
- Charles Philippe Lafont (1781–1839), French violinist and composer
- Charles-Philippe Larivière (1798–1876), French painter and lithographer
- Charles Philippe Leblond (1910–2007), Canadian pioneer of cell biology and stem cell research
- Charles-Philippe Place (1814–1893), French Catholic cardinal, prelate, Bishop of Marseille and Archbishop of Rennes
- Charles-Philippe Robin (1821–1885), French anatomist, biologist and histologist
- Charles Philippe de Rodoan (1552–1616), Bishop of Middelburg and Bishop of Bruges
- Charles-Philippe Ronsin (1751–1794), French general of the Revolutionary Army of the First French Republic and extreme radical leader

== See also ==
- Charles-Amédée-Philippe van Loo (1719–1795), French painter
