= Marie Louise d'Orléans =

Queen of Spain from 1679 to 1689

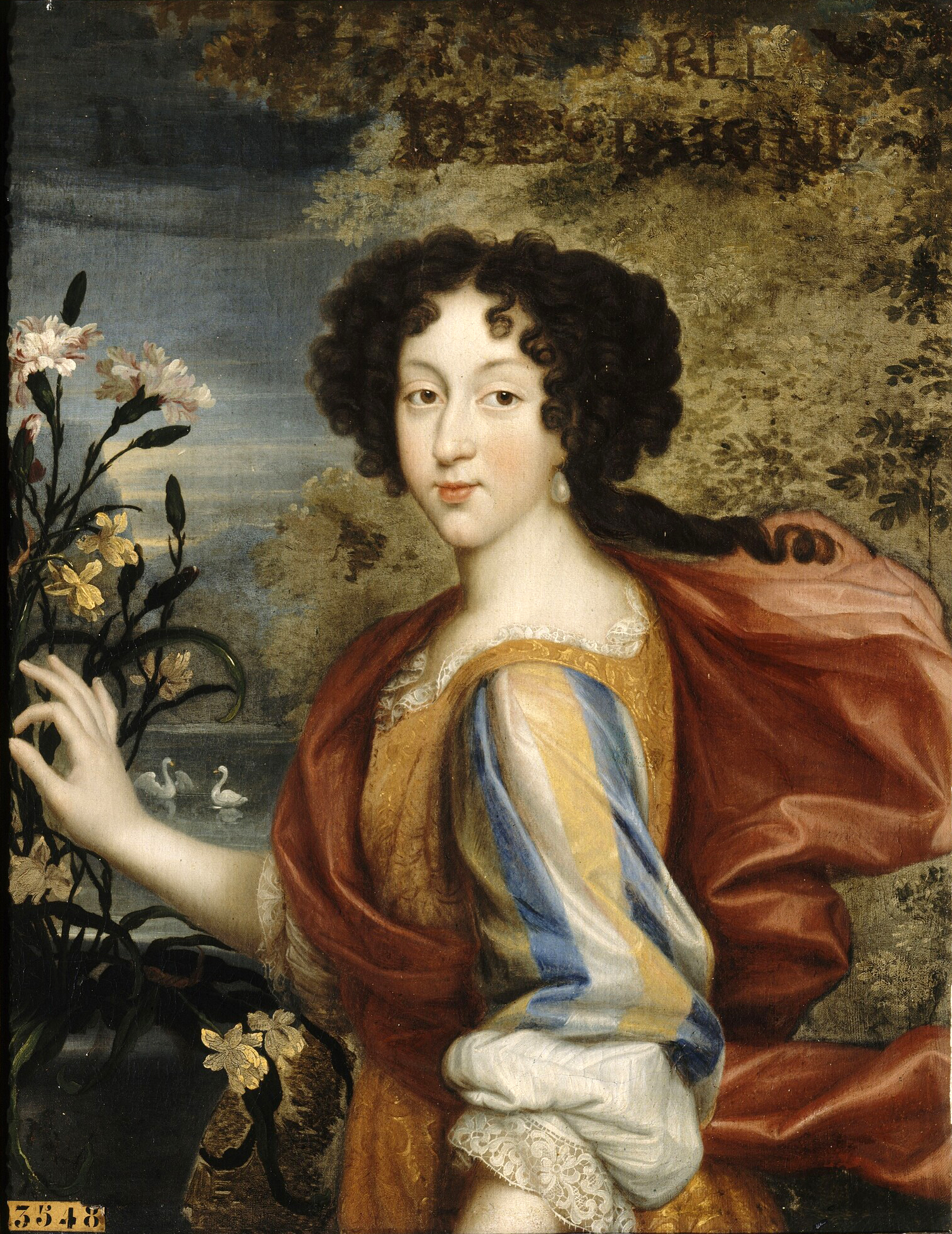
- Portrait in the Palace of Versailles, c. 1679

Queen consort of Spain
- Tenure: 19 November 1679 – 12 February 1689
- Born: 26 March 1662; Palais Royal, Paris, France
- Died: 12 February 1689 (aged 26); Royal Alcázar, Madrid, Spain
- Burial: El Escorial
- Spouse: Charles II of Spain (m. 1679)
Names
- French: Marie Louise d'Orléans; Spanish: María Luisa de Borbón-Orleans y Estuardo
- House: Orléans
- Father: Philippe I, Duke of Orléans
- Mother: Henrietta of England

Marie Louise d'Orléans (Spanish: María Luisa de Borbón-Orleans y Estuardo; 26 March 1662 – 12 February 1689) was Queen of Spain from 1679 to 1689 as the first wife of King Charles II. She was born petite-fille de France as the daughter of Philippe I, Duke of Orléans and Princess Henrietta of England. Marie became the Queen of Spain on 19 November 1679, and remained in her post until her death in 1689 from the presumed cause of appendicitis.

== Life ==
=== Childhood ===
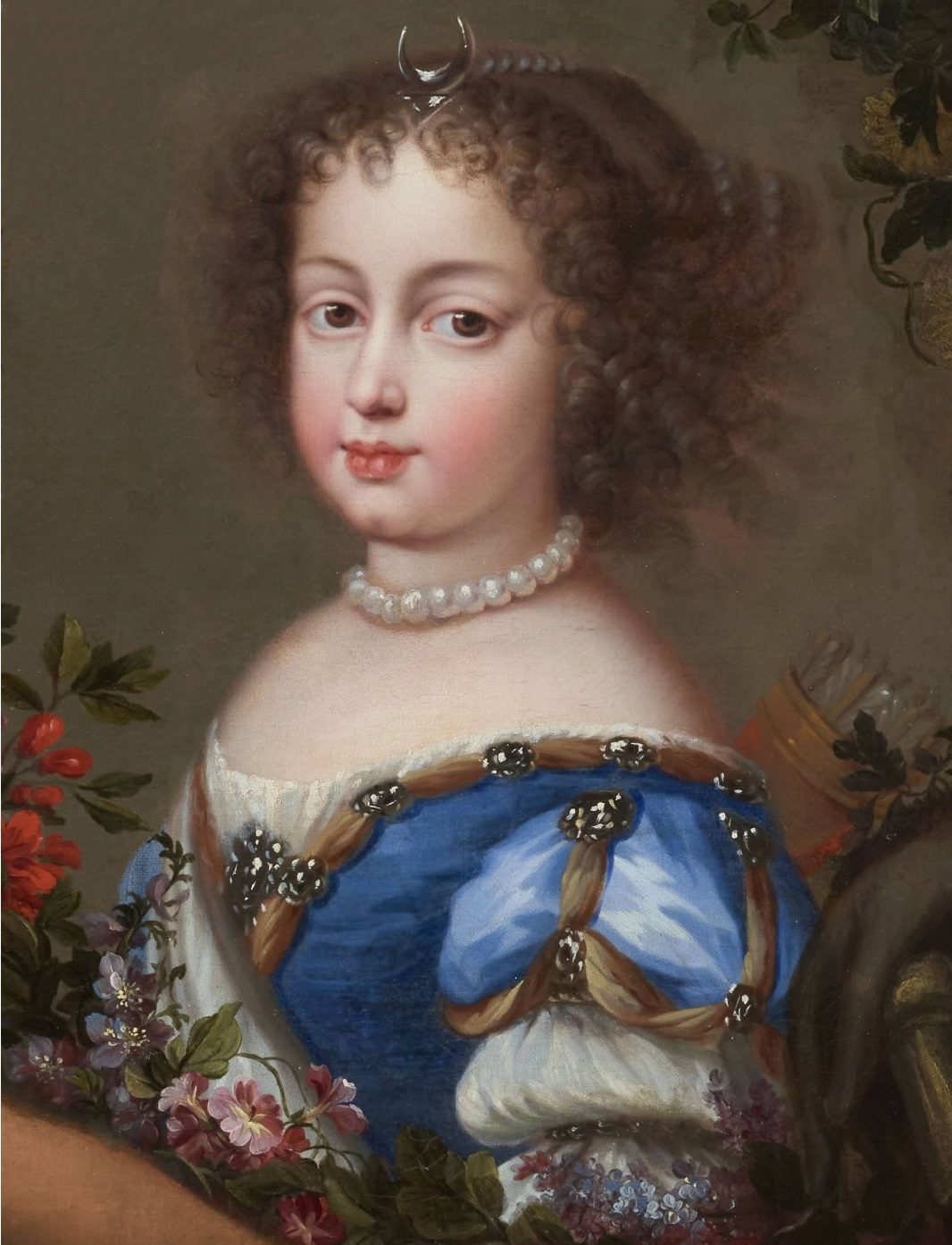
Marie Louise as a child (workshop of Jean Nocret, c. 1667)

Marie Louise d'Orléans was born at the Palais Royal in Paris. She was the eldest daughter of Philippe of France, Duke of Orléans and of his first wife, Princess Henrietta of England. As a petite-fille de France she was entitled to the attribute of Royal Highness, although, as was customary at court at the palace of Versailles, her style, Mademoiselle d'Orléans, was more often used. Both parents were initially disappointed about her sex, with her mother reportedly exclaiming "Then throw her into the river!", although she was quickly consoled by her mother-in-law (Marie Louise's grandmother) that despite not giving birth to a prince, her infant daughter - just months younger than her cousin the dauphin - could one day become queen by marriage to her cousin.

Marie Louise was her father's favourite child, and had a happy childhood, residing most of the time in the Palais Royal, and at the château de Saint-Cloud, situated a few kilometres west of Paris. Marie Louise spent a lot of time with both her paternal and maternal grandmothers—Anne, who doted on her and left the bulk of her fortune to her when she died in 1666; and Henrietta Maria, who lived in Colombes.

Marie Louise's mother died in 1670. The following year, her father married Elisabeth Charlotte of the Palatinate. All her life, Marie Louise would maintain an affectionate correspondence with her stepmother. Marie Louise received a careful education, picking up skills including horse riding, playing musical instruments such as the harpsichord, singing and dancing, and holding formal conversations – all under the watchful eye of her governess, Louise Françoise de Chavigny. It is, however, recorded that the biggest influence on Marie Louise's later character was Louise Élisabeth de Rouxel, who not only shaped her character but also helped to curb her frequent fits of anger. Contemporary descriptions viewed her in a positive way:

[Of an] elegant presence, of well-proportioned stature, with a serene and flattering countenance; her hair was thick and dark brown; her eyebrows were arched and her eyes were black, lively, large, and majestic; her forehead was broad and white; her lips were full and slightly rounded; her nose was sharp and well-formed; her manner was graceful and perfect.

Coat of arms of Queen Marie Louise

=== Queen ===
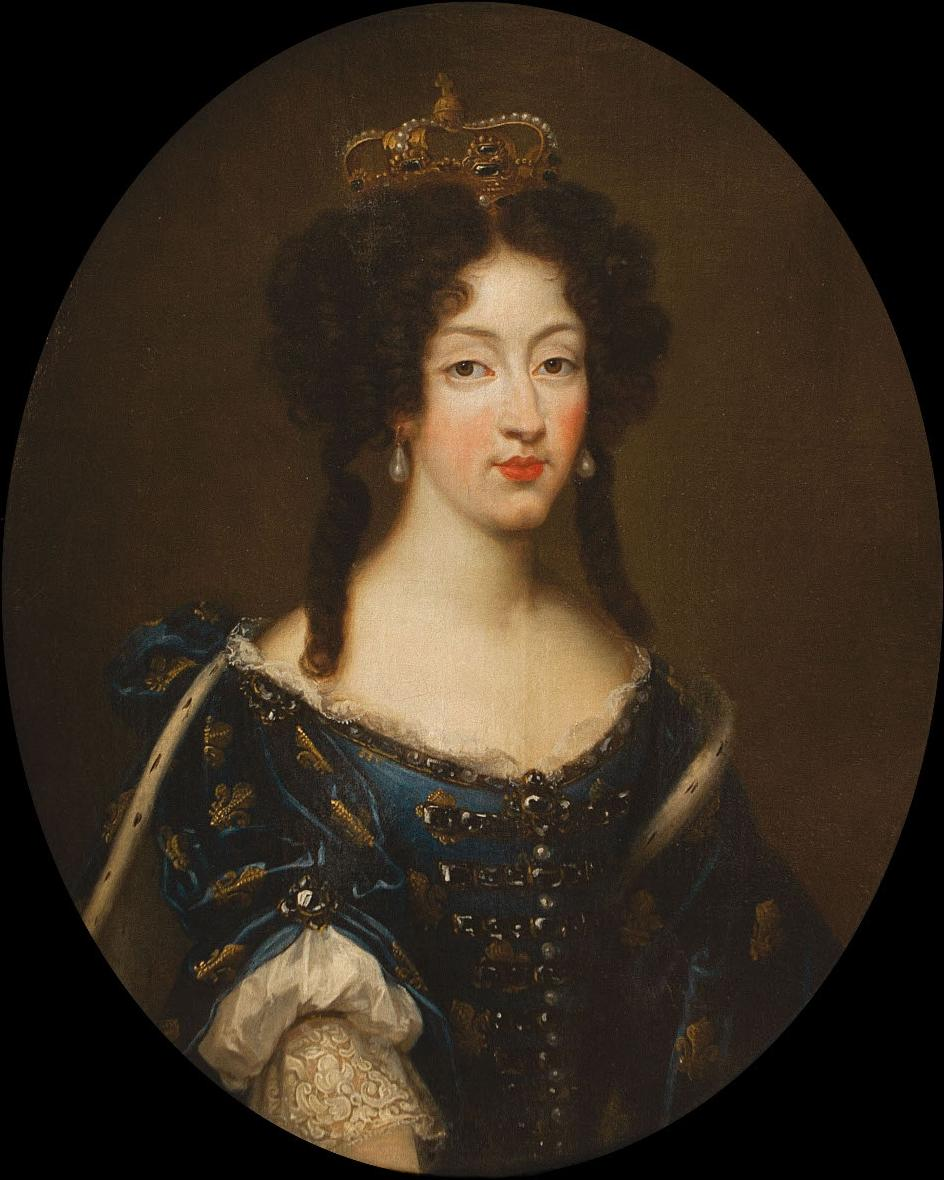
Portrait of Marie Louise wearing a fleur-de-lis dress to signify her relations to France and a Spanish crown to signify her new country.

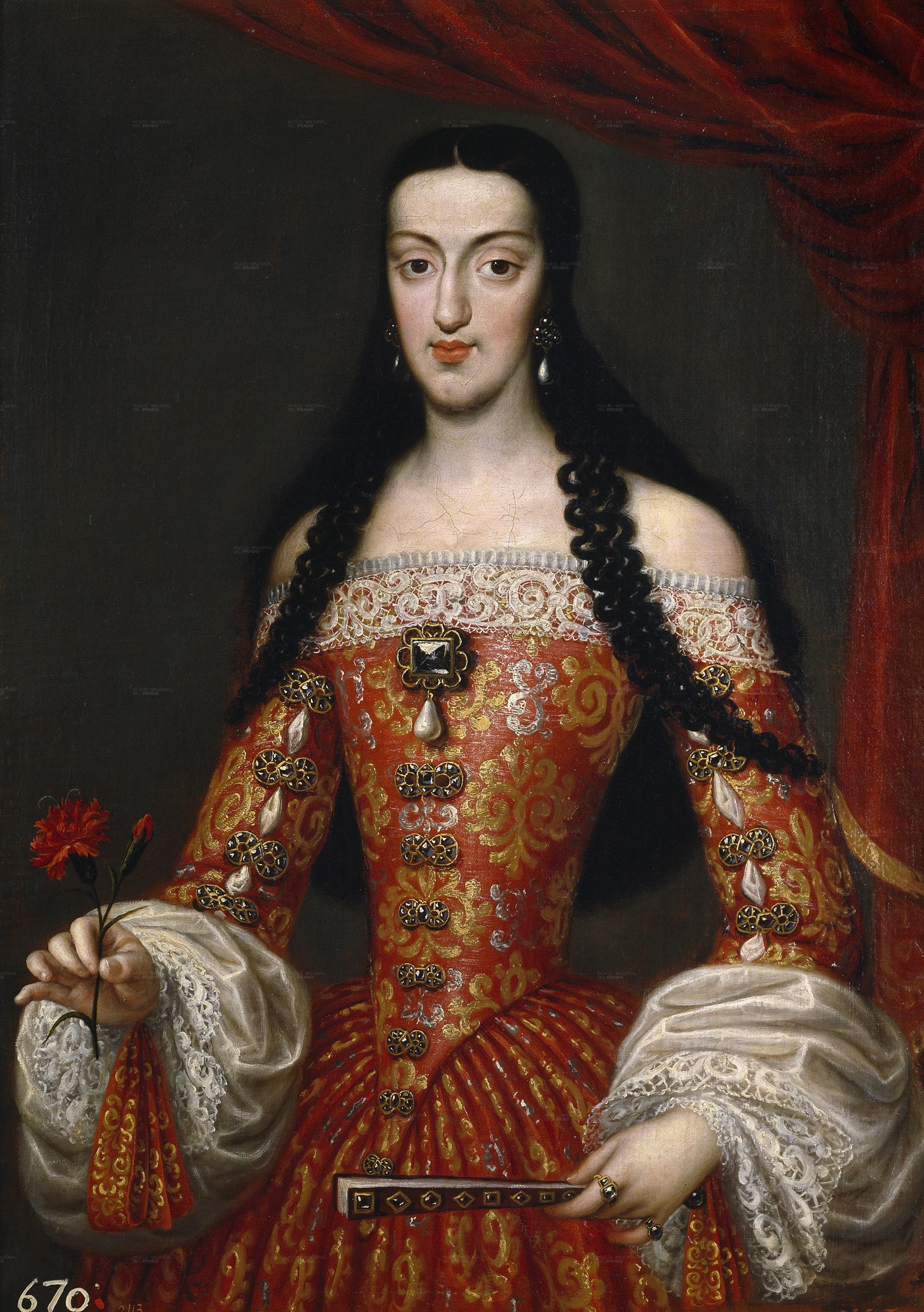
Portrait by José García Hidalgo, c. 1679

In July 1679, Marie was informed by her father, Philippe, and uncle, King Louis XIV of her betrothal to Charles II of Spain. In the beginning, the members of the Spanish government disliked the choice of Marie Louise as Queen of Spain, because she was the daughter of an English princess and, if she had a son, they disliked the prospect of the future Spanish king being related to a Protestant royal family. However, Marie Louise was a French princess and it was very important for the Spanish monarchy to seal the peace with France, so the Spanish ministers accepted the marriage. Distressed by the arranged marriage, Marie Louise spent most of her time weeping, since she had fallen in love with her cousin the dauphin. The contract was signed and the proxy marriage took place at the Palace of Fontainebleau on 30 August 1679; standing for the groom was Mademoiselle d'Orléans' distant cousin Louis Armand de Bourbon, Prince of Conti. Until mid-September, there were a series of formal events held in honour of the new Queen of Spain. Marie Louise went to the convent of Val-de-Grâce, before her departure, where the heart of her mother was kept. She would never return to France.

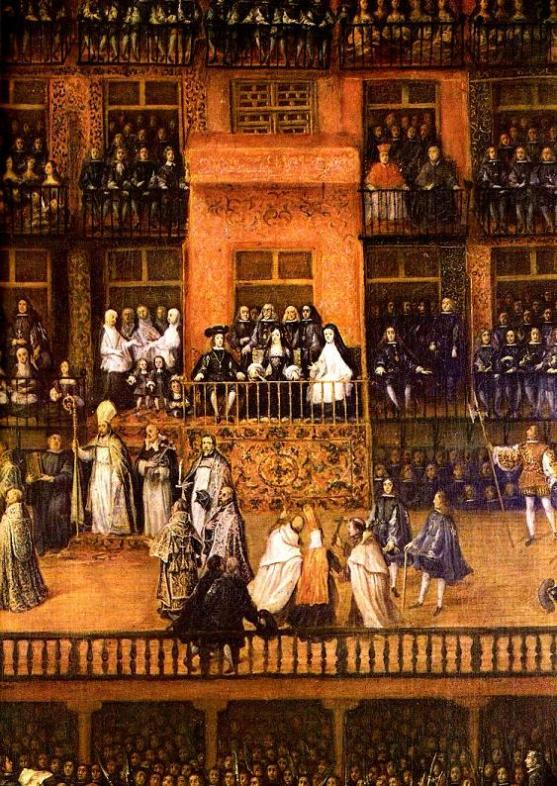
Marie Louise, Charles and his mother, Mariana of Austria, attend together an ”auto da fe” from a balcony in Madrid's Plaza Mayor on 30 June 1680. Detail from Auto da fe (1683), painting by Francisco Rizi. Prado Museum, Madrid.

On 19 November 1679, Marie Louise married Charles in person in Quintanapalla, near Burgos, Spain, coinciding with the signing of the Treaties of Nijmegen between France and the Habsburg monarchy. The Queen made her official entrance into Madrid on the 13th of January, 1680. Her new husband had fallen in love with her and remained so until the end of his life. However, the confining etiquette of the Spanish Court (e.g., touching the Queen was forbidden) and unsuccessful attempts to bear a child caused her distress. Her most frequent companion was the French ambassadress, Marie Gigault de Bellefonds, the Marquise de Villars.

After ten years of marriage, the couple had no children. Marie Louise confided to the French ambassador, that

she was really not a virgin any longer, but that as far as she could figure things, she believed she would never have children.

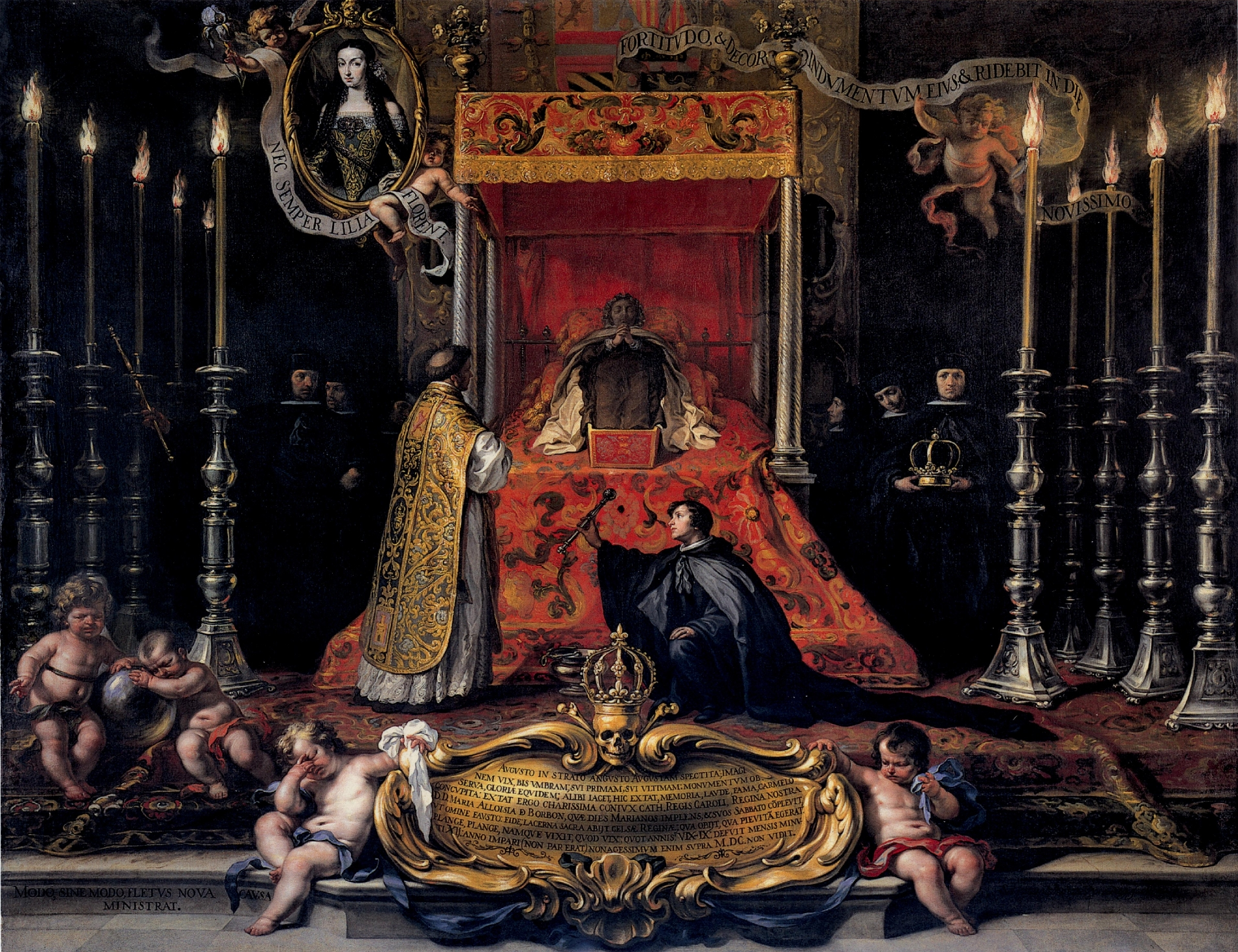
Marie Louise, Queen of Spain, lying in state in the Royal Alcazar of Madrid (1689), oil painting by Sebastián Muñoz.

During the last years of her life she became overweight. She was reportedly fond of sweetened lemon and cinnamon drinks, the making of which required 32 pounds of sugar. After horseback riding on 11 February 1689, she experienced abdominal pain followed by convulsions and vomiting. After doctors found that her condition had become mortal, confessors were called in to administer last rites.

On her deathbed, she spoke to her husband the following words:

Many women may be with His Majesty, but none will love him more than I do

She died the following night. There were rumors she was poisoned, coming especially from her native France; however, an autopsy proved otherwise. The official funeral rites were held with the usual pomp and ceremony of a queen consort at monastery of the Incarnation. Marie Louise was buried in the royal pantheon of El Escorial.

== Ancestry ==
Ancestors of Marie Louise d'Orléans

8. Henry IV of France
4. Louis XIII of France
9. Marie de' Medici
2. Philippe of France, Duke of Orléans
10. Philip III of Spain
5. Anne of Austria
11. Margaret of Austria
1. Marie Louise d'Orléans
12. James I of England
6. Charles I of England
13. Anne of Denmark
3. Henrietta of England
14. Henry IV of France (= 8)
7. Henrietta Maria of France
15. Marie de' Medici (= 9)

== Sources ==
- Barker, Nancy Nichols (1989). Brother to the Sun King, Philippe, Duke of Orléans. Johns Hopkins University Press. ISBN 9780801837913.
- Cartwright, Julia (1894). Madame: A life of Henrietta, daughter of Charles L and duchess of Orleans. London: Seeley and Co.Ltd. ISBN 9781313600644.
- Campbell, Jodi (2017). At the First Table: Food and Social Identity in Early Modern Spain. University of Nebraska Press. ISBN 9780803290815.
- Hume, Martin Andrew Sharp (1905). Spain: Its Greatness and Decay (1479–1788). Cambridge at the University Press. ISBN 9781107639805.
- Hume, Martin Andrew Sharp (1906). Queens of Old Spain. McClure, Philips & Company. ISBN 9781107639805.
- Lurgo, Elisabetta (2021). Marie-Louise d'Orléans. La Princesse oubliée, nièce de Louis XIV (in French). Paris, Perrin. ISBN 9782262082116.
- Sternberg, Giora (2014). Status Interaction During the Reign of Louis XIV. Oxford University Press. ISBN 9780199640348.
- Savoie-Carignan, Guy Jean Raoul Eugène Charles Emmanuel de (1911). The seven richest heiresses of France. London: J. Long. ISBN 9785871464915.

Marie Louise of Orléans House of Orléans Cadet branch of the House of Bourbon Born: 26 April 1662 Died: 12 February 1689
Royal titles
Vacant Title last held by Mariana of Austria	Queen consort of Spain; 1679–1689	Vacant Title next held by Maria Anna of Neuburg
