= Claude Dufresne =

French radio host and writer (1920–2011)

Claude Dufresne (1920 – 2011) was a French writer, best known as the author of numerous historical biographies. He won many prizes among them the Prix Goncourt for biography. Among his subjects were Ninon de Lenclos, Anne de Bretagne, Francois I, George Sand, Balzac, Chopin, Morny, Bernard Blier, Hortense Schneider, the Marquise de Sevigne, Marie Antoinette, Marie Walewska, Jacques Offenbach, Luis Mariano, Tristan Bernard, Berlioz, Mistinguette, etc.

He was also a well-known playwright and librettist for the stage.
