= Philippe Charles, Duke of Anjou =

French duke

Philippe Charles
- Duke of Anjou
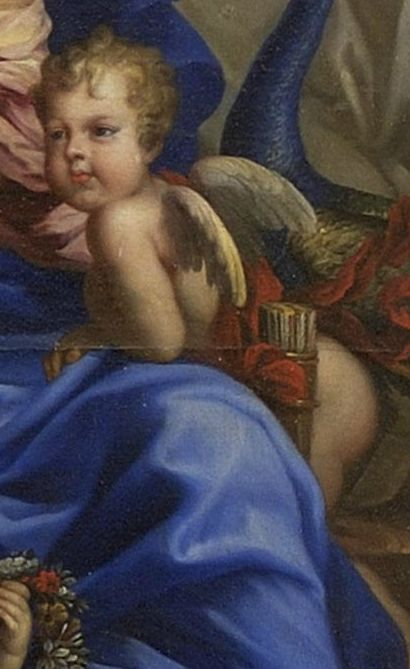
- Mythological portrait of Louis XIV and the royal family, by Jean Nocret
- Born: 5 August 1668; Château de Saint-Germain-en-Laye
- Died: 10 July 1671 (aged 2); Château de Saint-Germain-en-Laye
- Burial: 12 July 1671; Basilica of Saint-Denis
- House: Bourbon
- Father: Louis XIV
- Mother: Maria Theresa of Spain

Philippe-Charles, Duke of Anjou (5 August 1668 – 10 July 1671) was the fifth child and second son of King Louis XIV and Maria Theresa of Spain, and as such was a fils de France.

== Life ==
Philippe-Charles de France was born at the Château de Saint-Germain-en-Laye, near Paris, and titled duke of Anjou at birth. He was baptised at the Chapelle des Tuileries à Paris on 24 March 1668.

As a younger son of Louis XIV, Philippe-Charles was not expected to become the Dauphin; however, it was hoped he would inherit the vast fortune of his second cousin, Anne Marie Louise d'Orléans, Duchess of Montpensier, who had no children. According to Nancy Mitford, the Queen, his mother, suggested it many times. While at Saint-Germain-en-Laye, Philippe-Charles died of a chest infection, (Note: With the limitations of 17th century medicine, "chest infection" cannot be identified precisely.) like his elder sister, Anne-Élisabeth, who had died six years before his birth. Upon his death, the appanage of the Duchy of Anjou reverted to the Crown and was given to his younger brother, Louis François. Philippe-Charles was buried on 12 July 1671, at the Basilica of Saint-Denis.

At the death of the Duchess of Montpensier in 1693, her fortune went to her direct and legal heir, the House of Orléans (Philippe's uncle Philippe I, Duke of Orléans).

== Footnotes ==
Philippe Charles, Duke of Anjou House of Bourbon Born: 5 August 1668 Died: 10 July 1671
French nobility
Preceded by Philippe de France, Duke of Orléans	Duke of Anjou; 1668–1671	Succeeded by Louis-François de France
