= Nancy Nichols Barker =

American historian (1925–1994)

- Born: December 26, 1925; Mount Vernon, New York, U.S.
- Died: March 30, 1994 (aged 68)
- Occupation(s): Historian, academic, translator, editor

Nancy Nichols Barker (December 26, 1925 – March 30, 1994) was an American historian, editor, and professor at the University of Texas at Austin.

== Early life ==
Barker was born on December 26, 1925, in Mount Vernon, New York. She received a bachelor's degree at Vassar College in 1946 and master's and doctoral degrees at the University of Pennsylvania in 1947 and 1955, respectively.

== Career ==
Barker taught briefly at the University of Delaware and joined the faculty of the University of Texas at Austin in 1955. She was a specialist in French diplomatic history.

Barker was the author of several books, including The Empress Eugenie and the Foreign Policy of the Second Empire (1967), The French Experience in Mexico, 1821-1861: A History of Constant Misunderstanding (1979), and Phillippe, Duke of Orleans (1640-1701): Brother to the Sun King (1989). She also translated and edited The French Legation in Texas (1971-1973). With Marvin L. Brown Jr., Barker edited Diplomacy in an Age of Nationalism: Essays in Honor of Lynn Marshall Case (1971).

Her work as the translator and editor of The French Legation in Texas won her the Gilbert Chinard Prize, the Summerfield G. Roberts Award, and the Award of Merit from the American Association for State and Local History. She also won the American Historical Society's Leo Gershoy Award in 1989 for Brother to the Sun King.

Barker was a member of the American Historical Association, the Society for French Historical Studies and the Western Society for French Historical Studies.

== Death ==
Barker died on March 30, 1994, at the age of 68.

== Works ==
- Distaff Diplomacy: The Empress Eugénie and the Foreign Policy of the Second Empire, 1967
- The French Experience in Mexico, 1821 - 1861 : A History of Constant Misunderstanding, 1979
- Brother to the Sun King : Philippe, Duke of Orléans, 1989

Translator and editor of the two-volume :

- The French Legation in Texas, 1973

Editor, with Marvin L. Brown:

- Diplomacy in an Age of Nationalism: Essays in Honor of Lynn Marshall Case, 1971
