= Jean Nocret =

French painter (1615/17 – 1672)

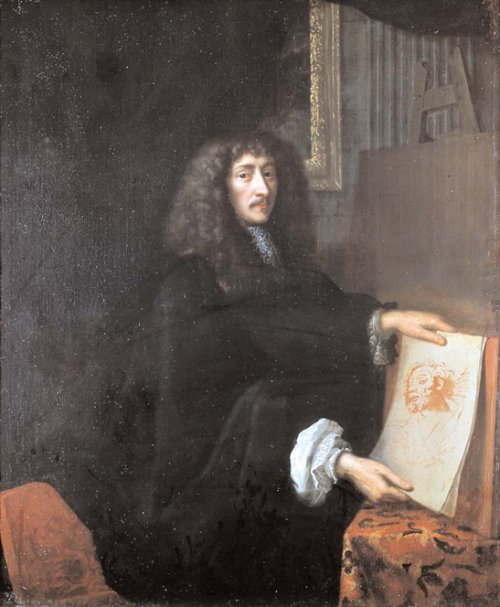
- Posthumous portrait by his son, Jean-Charles, 1674
- Born: December 1615 or December 1617
- Died: November 1672
- Education: Jean LeClerc; Nicolas Poussin
- Children: Jean-Charles Nocret
- Patrons: Gaston d'Orléans; Louis XIV

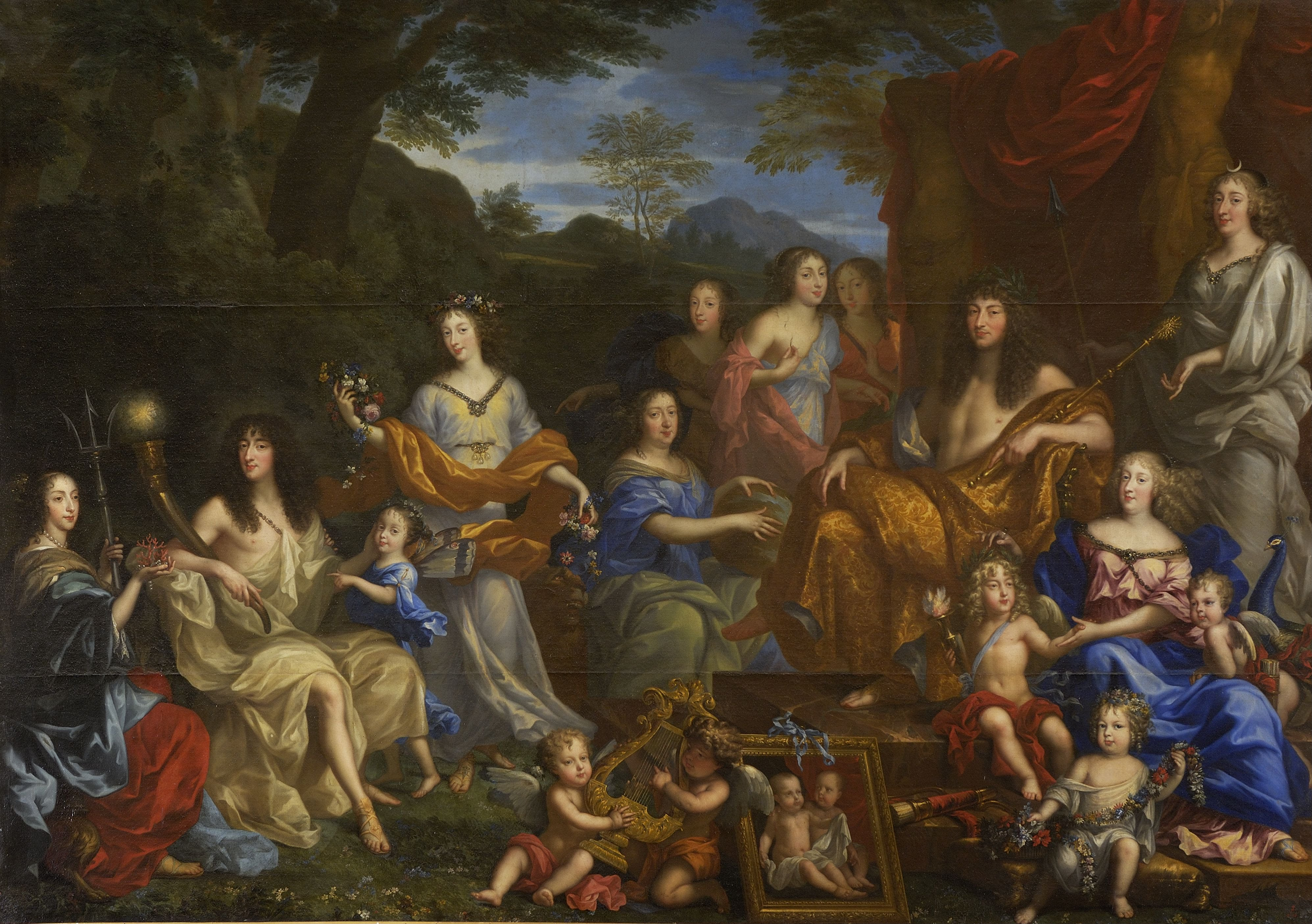
Group portrait of the French Royal Family dressed as characters from mythology (1670). King Louis XIV is Apollo. The sitters are identified here.

Jean Nocret (December 1615/17, Nancy – November 1672, Paris) was a French painter, known for his portraits of the French royal family. Many portraits of uncertain origin have been attributed to him.

== Biography ==
He was a student of Jean LeClerc. Later, he traveled to Rome, where he met Nicolas Poussin and did some work for Poussin's patron, Paul Fréart de Chantelou. Poussin, however, thought that Nocret was a pretentious young man and complained that he left his work unfinished because he had received better offers.

Nocret returned to Paris in 1644. Five years later, he managed to obtain an appointment as painter to King Louis XIV and Gaston, Duke of Orléans. He also served as the king's valet de chambre.

In 1657, he accompanied the Bishop of Comminges on a diplomatic mission to Portugal, and executed portraits of the Portuguese Royal Family.

Back in Paris, in 1660, he was commissioned by the new Duke of Orléans to decorate the interiors of the Château de Saint-Cloud with scenes from Greek mythology. The château was later destroyed, during the Franco-Prussian War.

Three years later, his painting, The Repentance of Saint Peter, earned him a place in the Académie royale de peinture et de sculpture. He became a professor there in 1664.

Between 1666 and 1669, he decorated Queen Maria Theresa's apartments at the Tuileries Palace, under the direction of Charles Le Brun. These decorations were destroyed during the Franco-Prussian War, when the Tuileries was burned down. Most of them depicted scenes relating to the goddess Minerva.

His son, Jean-Charles (1648–1719), was also a portraitist, but did history painting as well. After his father's death, he was called upon to decorate the queen's apartments at Palace of Versailles.
