= Marie Thérèse, Madame Royale =

French Madame Royale (1667–1672)

Marie Thérèse of France
- Madame Royale
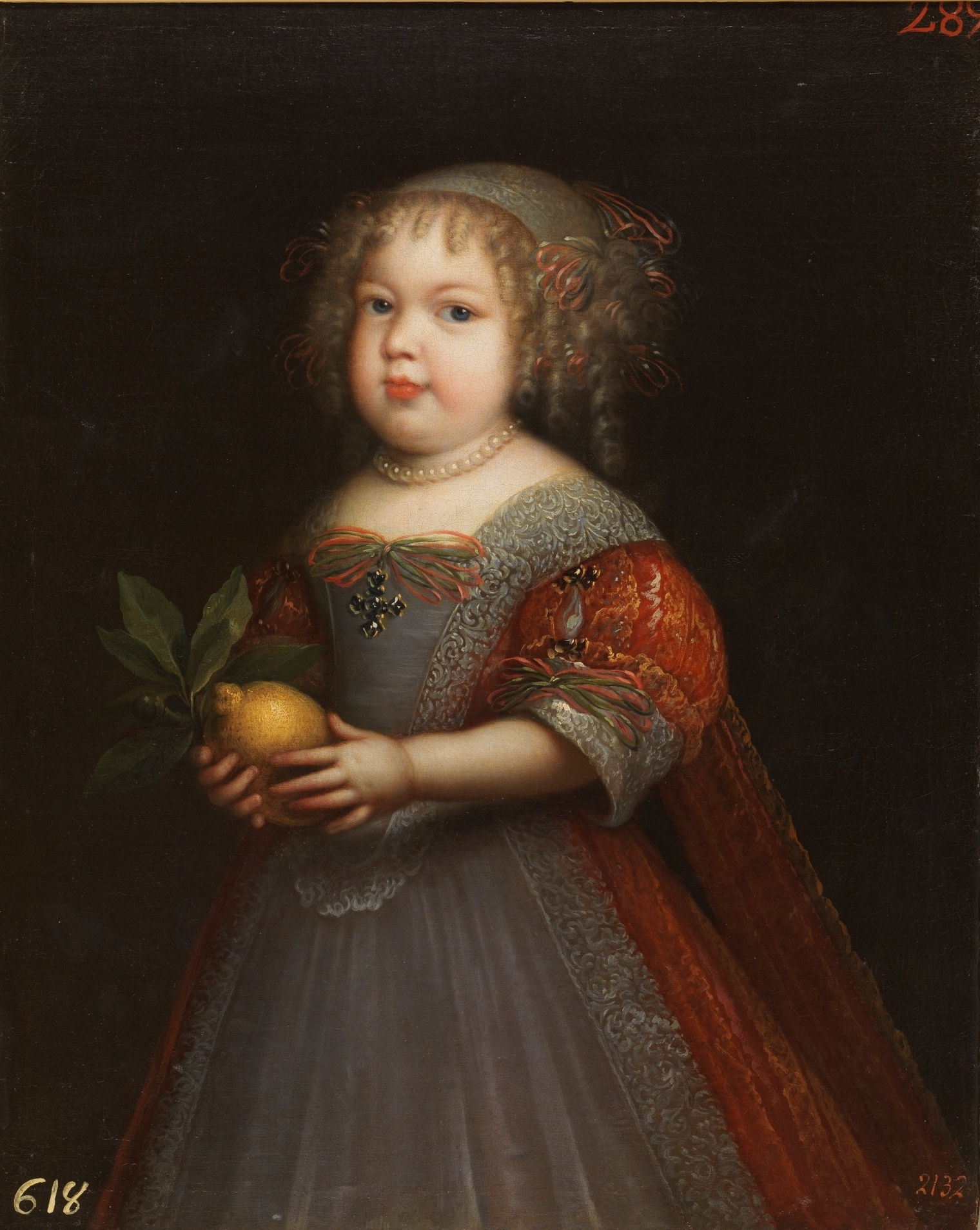
- Portrait by Nocret, c. 1671
- Born: 2 January 1667; Château de Saint-Germain-en-Laye, Saint-Germain-en-Laye, France
- Died: 1 March 1672 (aged 5); Château de Saint-Germain-en-Laye
- Burial: 3 March 1672; Basilica of Saint-Denis
- House: Bourbon
- Father: Louis XIV of France
- Mother: Maria Theresa of Spain

Marie Thérèse of France (2 January 1667 – 1 March 1672) was a French princess, a fille de France. She was the fourth child of King Louis XIV and Queen Maria Theresa. As the eldest surviving daughter of a French king, she was known at court by the traditional honorific Madame Royale.

== Life ==
=== Birth and childhood ===
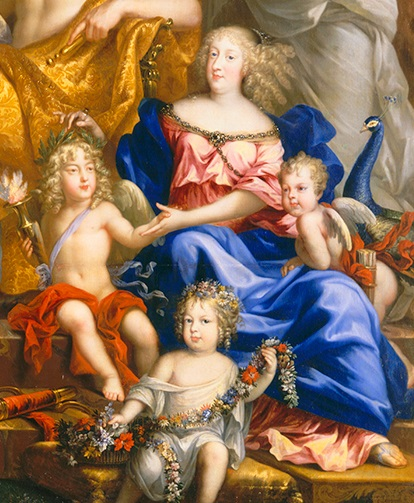
Queen Maria Theresa and her children from the Mythological portrait of Louis XIV and the royal family by Nocret (1670)

Marie Thérèse was born on 2 January 1667 at the Château de Saint-Germain-en-Laye, the third daughter of King Louis XIV and Queen Maria Theresa of Spain. Her parents were double-first cousins to each other, meaning that they shared all four grandparents together.

As a Fille de France ("Daughter of France"), she was entitled to the style of Royal Highness. She was christened in 1668 at the chapel of the Louvre Palace and named Marie Thérèse after her mother. Her royal governess was Louise de Prie.

Her mother wanted her to become Queen consort of Spain by marrying King Charles II of Spain. Marie Thérèse later adapted the nickname "la petite Madame" to distinguish herself from her uncle's wives, Madame Henrietta and Madame Elizabeth Charlotte.

=== Death ===
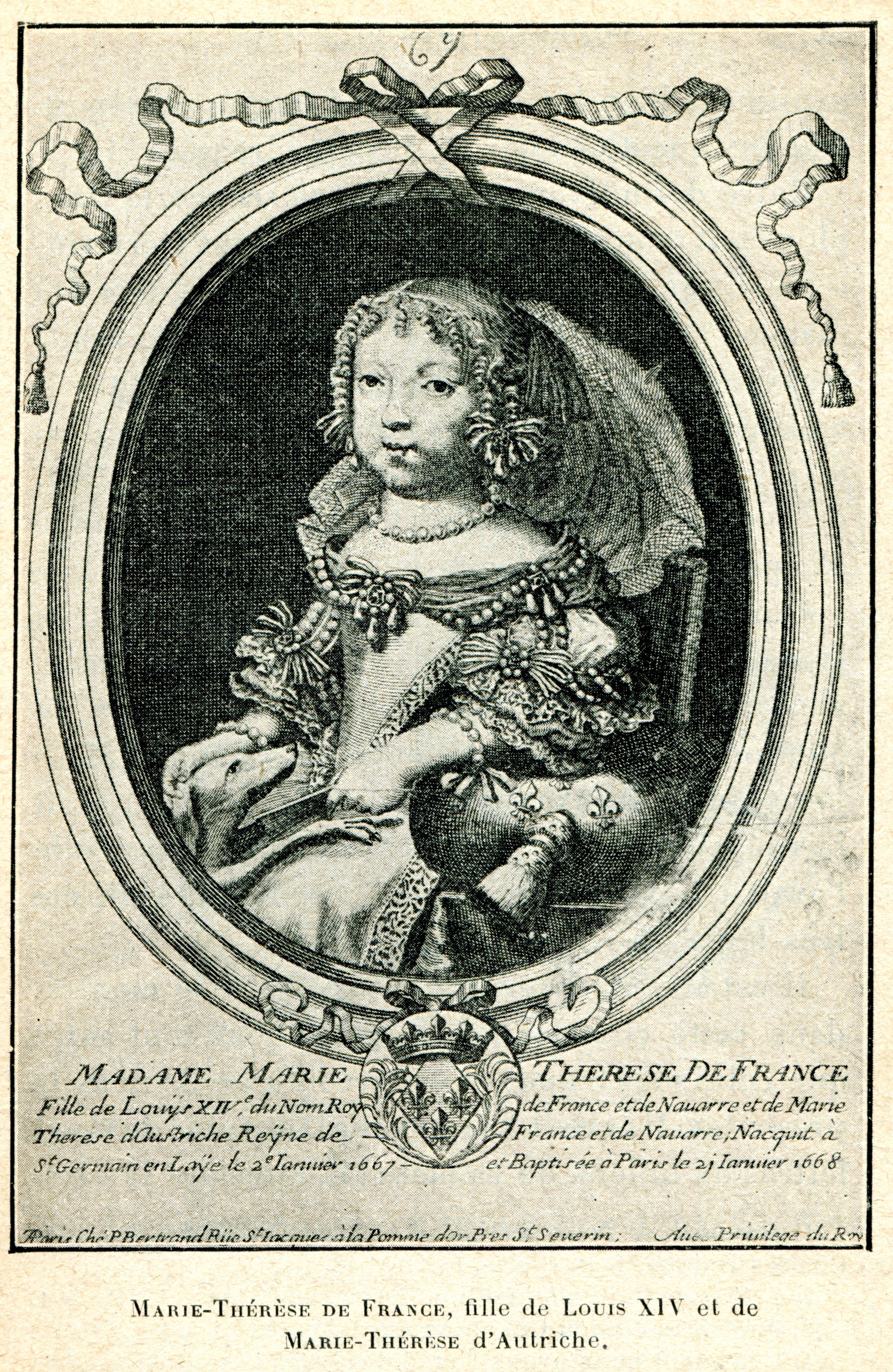
Engraving of Marie Thérèse

On the night of 1 March 1672, Marie Thérèse died at the age of five from tuberculosis. After her death, her parents retreated to the Palace of Versailles and upon returning her father was "reportedly constantly in her bedroom." Her aunt, the Duchess of Orléans who was there at the time of her passing, later detailed her death in her memoirs:

A cautery which had been improperly made in the nape of the neck had drawn her mouth all on one side, so that it was almost entirely in her left cheek. For this reason talking was very painful to her, and she said very little. It was necessary to be accustomed to her way of speaking to understand her. Just when she was about to die her mouth resumed its proper place, and she did not seem at all ugly. I was present at her death. She did not say a word to her father, although a convulsion had restored her mouth. The King, who had a good heart and was very fond of his children, wept excessively and made me weep also. The Queen was not present, for, being pregnant, they would not let her come.

== Ancestry ==
Ancestors of Marie Thérèse, Madame Royale

8. Henry IV of France (= 14)
4. Louis XIII of France
9. Marie de' Medici (= 15)
2. Louis XIV of France
10. Philip III of Spain (= 12)
5. Ana of Spain
11. Margaret of Austria (= 13)
1. Marie Thérèse of France
12. Philip III of Spain (= 10)
6. Philip IV of Spain
13. Margaret of Austria (= 11)
3. Maria Theresa of Spain
14. Henry IV of France (= 8)
7. Elisabeth of France
15. Marie de' Medici (= 9)

Marie Thérèse, Madame Royale House of Bourbon Cadet branch of the Capetian dynasty Born: 2 January 1667 Died: 1 March 1672
French royalty
Preceded by Henriette Marie	Madame Royale; 1667–1672	Succeeded by Louise-Élisabeth
