= Louis François, Duke of Anjou =

Duke of Anjou

Louis François
- Duke of Anjou
- Born: 14 June 1672; Château de Saint-Germain-en-Laye
- Died: 4 November 1672 (aged 0); Château de Saint-Germain-en-Laye
- Burial: Basilica of Saint-Denis; Val-de-Grâce (heart)
Names
- French: Louis-François de France
- House: Bourbon
- Father: Louis XIV
- Mother: Maria Theresa of Spain

Louis François of France, Duke of Anjou (French: Louis François de France, Spanish: Luis Francisco de Francia; 14 June 1672 – 4 November 1672) was the sixth child and third son of King Louis XIV of France and his wife, Queen Maria Theresa of Spain. As such he was a Fils de France and a Prince of France. Infant Louis died at the age of 4 months and 21 days old. The death of Louis may have been due to inbreeding.

== Life ==
Louis François was born on 14 June 1672 at the Château de Saint-Germain-en-Laye, near Paris. He was created Duke of Anjou at birth, a title previously vacant since the death of his older brother, Philippe Charles, who had died the previous year. The birth of the Duke of Anjou was a relief to the king and queen, who had lost four children. But the Prince's health soon showed signs of deterioration most likely of inbreeding as his parents were first cousins. The king remotely approved that his son's wet nurse be Màrie d' Velntion who moved to France.

Despite the care, the little prince's health did not improve. He was hastily baptized on 1 November and given the first name Louis François Charles. He died on 4 November 1672 at the age of four months at the Château de Saint-Germain-en-Laye. He was buried in the Basilica of Saint-Denis, while his heart was buried in the abbey of Val-de-Grâce. Died as an infant, the young Louis-François does not appear in any portraits. While medical treatments and choices may have contributed to sending the royal couple's children to the grave, the kinship of Louis XIV and Maria Theresa of Austria as first cousins certainly played a role, given the children's fragile physical condition.

== Ancestry ==
Louis François's paternal grandparents were Louis XIII and Anne of Austria, he was descended, on his mother's side, from Philip IV of Spain and Élisabeth of France. Louis XIII and Élisabeth de Bourbon were siblings (the children of Henry IV of France and Marie de' Medici), as were Anne of Austria and Philip IV, who were the children of Philip III of Spain and Margaret of Austria. That means that he had only four great-grandparents instead of the usual eight, and that his double-cousin parents had the same coefficient of co-ancestry (1/4) as if they were half-siblings.

Ancestors of Louis François, Duke of Anjou

16. Antoine of Navarre
8. Henry IV of France
17. Jeanne III of Navarre
4.Louis XIII of France
18. Francesco I de' Medici, Grand Duke of Tuscany
9. Marie de' Medici
19. Joanna of Austria
2. Louis XIV of France
20. Philip II of Spain
10. Philip III of Spain
21. Anna of Austria
5. Anne of Austria
22. Charles II, Archduke of Inner Austria
11. Margaret of Austria
23. Maria Anna of Bavaria
1. Louis François of France
24. Philip II of Spain
12. Philip III of Spain
25. Anna of Austria (= 21)
6. Philip IV of Spain
26. Charles II, Archduke of Inner Austria (= 22)
13. Margaret of Austria
27. Maria Anna of Bavaria (= 23)
3. Maria Theresa of Spain
28. Antoine of Navarre (= 16)
14. Henry IV of France
29. Jeanne III of Navarre (= 17)
7. Elisabeth of France
30. Francesco I de' Medici, Grand Duke of Tuscany (= 18)
15. Marie de' Medici
31. Joanna of Austria (= 19)

== Sources ==
- Maxtone-Graham, Margaret Ethel Blair Oliphant (1915). "Chapter X". Children of France. New York, E.P. Dutton and Co.
- Geeraert, Anaïs (3 April 2019). "Louis-François, duc d'Anjou, fils de Louis XIV". Histoire et Secrets.
- Alexandre Lenoir. "Les coeurs et entrailles des reines princes et princesses au val de grace (avant 1793)". Saint Denis Tombeaux (in French).

Louis François, Duke of Anjou House of Bourbon Born: 14 June 1672 Died: 4 November 1672
French nobility
Preceded by Philippe Charles of France	Duke of Anjou; 1672–1672	Succeeded by Philip V of Spain
