= Catalina de la Rosa =

17th-century Spanish stage actress

Catalina de la Rosa (died 1646), was a Spanish stage actress.

She married the actor-manager Nicolás Pedro de la Rosa (1613–1675) in 1635. Together, they founded the highly successful theatre company "La Compañía de la Rosa" in 1636, which was favored by the queen, Elisabeth of France (1602–1644). They toured around Spain and founded several theatres in several cities.

When they married, the couple owned no property. Their first child was baptized in Valladolid, with Antonio de Vitoria and Jusepa Románel as godparents and the Spanish actor Cosme Pérez, known as Juan Rana, and Antonio Ramos as witnesses. Catalina De la Rosa died in 1646.
