= Maria Theresa of Spain =

Queen of France from 1660 to 1683

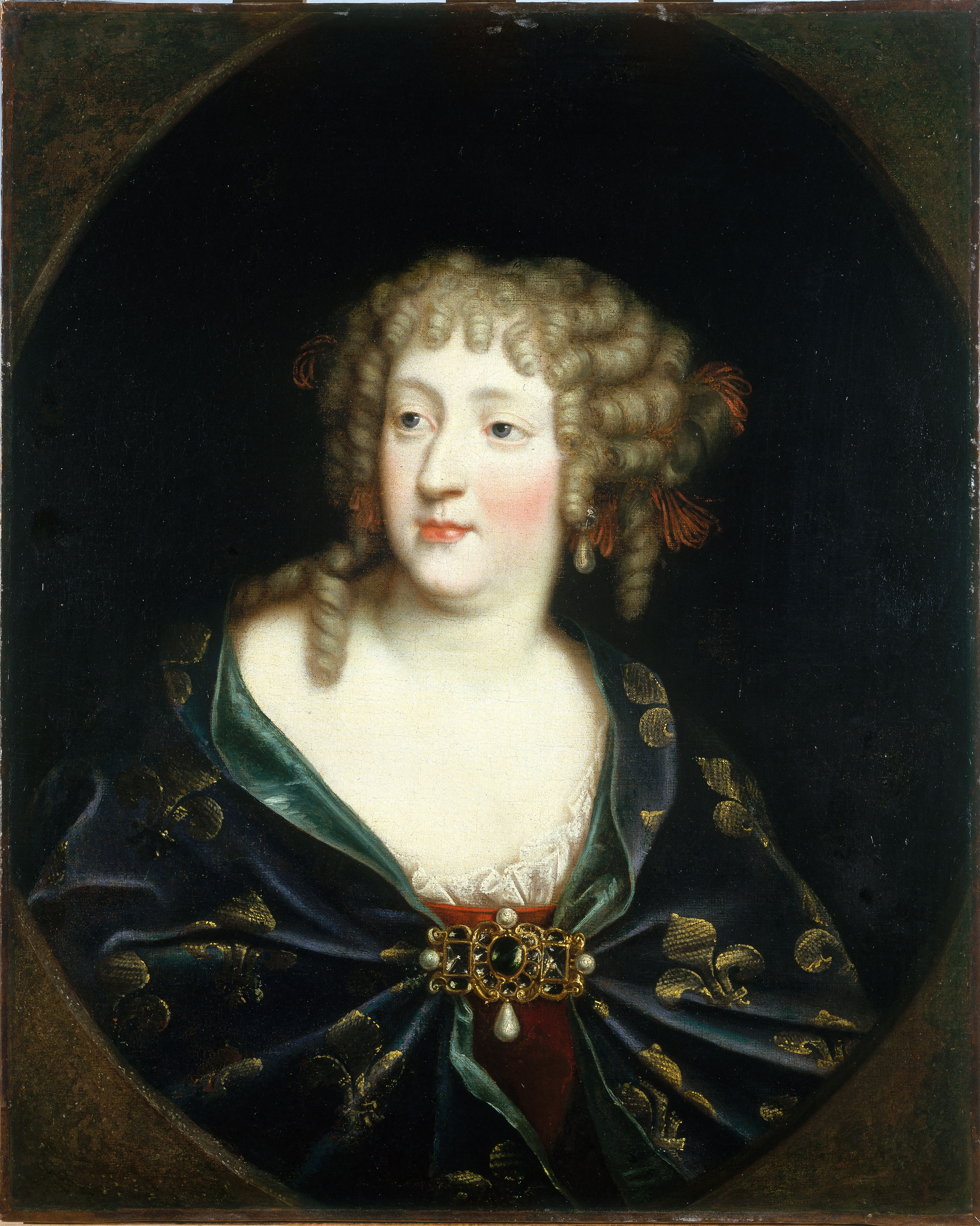

Queen consort of France
- Tenure: 9 June 1660 – 30 July 1683
- Born: 10 September 1638; El Escorial, Crown of Castile
- Died: 30 July 1683 (aged 44); Palace of Versailles, Kingdom of France
- Burial: Basilica of St Denis
- Spouse: Louis XIV (m. 1660)
- Issue more...: Louis, Grand Dauphin; Marie Thérèse, Madame Royale; Philippe Charles, Duke of Anjou; Louis François, Duke of Anjou
Names
- Spanish: María Teresa de Austria y Borbón
- House: Habsburg
- Father: Philip IV of Spain
- Mother: Elisabeth of France

Maria Theresa of Spain (Spanish: María Teresa de España; French: Marie-Thérèse d'Espagne; 10 September 1638 – 30 July 1683) was Queen of France from 1660 to 1683 as the wife of King Louis XIV. She was born an Infanta of Spain and Portugal as the daughter of King Philip IV and Elisabeth of France, and was also an Archduchess of Austria as a member of the Spanish branch of the House of Habsburg.

Her marriage in 1660 to King Louis XIV, her double first cousin, was arranged with the purpose of ending the lengthy war between France and Spain. Famed for her virtue and piety, she saw five of her six children die in early childhood, and is frequently viewed as an object of pity in historical accounts of her husband's reign, since she was often neglected by the court and overshadowed by the King's many mistresses.

Without any political influence in the French court or government (except briefly in 1672, when she was named regent during her husband's absence during the Franco-Dutch War, making her the last Queen of France to hold a regency), she died aged 44 due to complications from an abscess on her arm. Her grandson Philip V inherited the Spanish throne in 1700 after the death of her younger half-brother, Charles II. The resulting War of the Spanish Succession established the House of Bourbon as the new ruling dynasty of Spain, where it has reigned with some interruption until the present time.

== At the Spanish court ==
=== Birth and early life ===
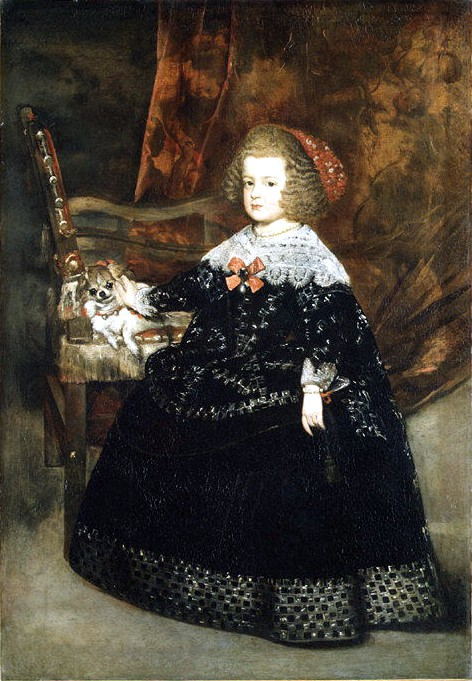
Portrait by Juan Bautista Martinez del Mazo c. 1645

Born at the Royal Monastery of El Escorial on 10 September 1638, Maria Theresa was the eighth child and seventh daughter of Philip IV of Spain and his first wife Elisabeth of France. As a member of the House of Habsburg, Maria Theresa was entitled to use the title Archduchess of Austria. She was baptized on 7 October by Cardinal Gaspar de Borja y Velasco, with Francesco I d'Este, Duke of Modena and Marie de Bourbon, Princess of Carignan, as godparents.

Maria Theresa was named after Teresa of Ávila, who her mother Elisabeth chose to protect her youngest daughter: all her six elder sisters died in infancy, (Note: Maria Margaret of Austria, Infanta of Spain (14 August 1621 – 15 August 1621); Margaret Maria Catherine of Austria, Infanta of Spain (25 November 1623 – 22 December 1623); Maria Eugenia of Austria, Infanta of Spain (21 November 1625 – 21 August 1627); Miscarried daughter (16 November 1626); Isabella Maria Theresa of Austria, Infanta of Spain (31 October 1627 – 1 November 1627); Maria Anna Antonia Dominica Jacinta of Austria, Infanta of Spain (17 January 1636 – 5 December 1636)) with the only son and heir, Balthasar Charles, Prince of Asturias living. The Queen, born a princess of France and suffering greatly from being far from her native country, described to her daughter the beauties of France. She had promised that she would marry her cousin the Dauphin, born only five days before her. But on 6 October 1644, Elisabeth died following complications after another miscarriage, and left an immense void in the heart of the six-year-old Maria Theresa.

=== Education and youth ===
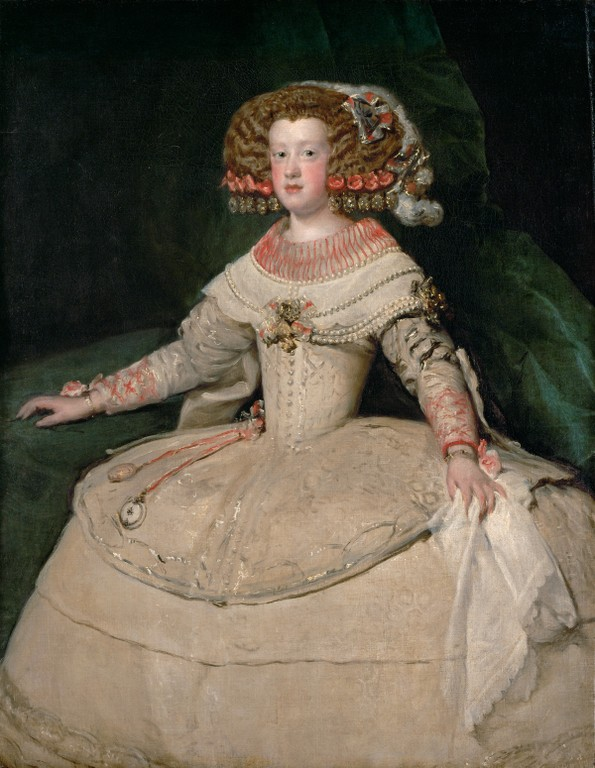
The infanta Maria Theresa aged 14 by Diego Velázquez, c. 1653. Her hairstyle and dress with wide panniers were popular in Spain

After the death of her mother, the young Infanta became closer to her father and received a strict and religious education in the sense of the Catholic Counter-Reformation. However, her education was careful and she was not deprived of affection and entertainment: she was surrounded by a multitude of pets and dwarves.

It was the royal governess Luisa Magdalena de Jesus who took care of her during her early years, a responsibility which later fell to Margarita Zapata de Mendoza, who as her Aya (governess) and Camarera Mayor (head lady-in-waiting) was to accompany her to France during her wedding.

From the age of five, Maria Theresa's religious education was first carried out by Juan de Palma, commissioner of the Indies who had been the confessor of Elizabeth of France. He was charged by Philip IV with caring for his daughter, as he had cared for the Infanta's mother. Later, Father Vasquez, a man recognised in Spain for being highly educated and of great virtue, was entrusted with Maria Theresa's spiritual education.

=== Heiress to the Spanish throne ===
The death of her brother Balthasar Charles in 1646 left Maria Theresa as heiress presumptive to the vast Spanish Empire. Although women were recognized as having the right to ascend the throne, Philip IV feared that the absence of a male heir could cause profound unrest that could destabilize the Catholic Monarchy. He thus remarried in 1649 to his niece, Archduchess Maria Anna of Austria, the union being intended to continue the matrimonial and political alliance between the Austrian and Spanish branches of the House of Habsburg. The proximity in age between Maria Theresa and her cousin (now her stepmother) fostered a deep affection and friendship between them.

Due to the fact that she was now his only heir, Philip IV taught the young Infanta notions of history and politics. She would once in France reveal her skills in this field, notably during her regency during the Dutch War. Maria Theresa also accompanied her father on his official trips and played a crucial role of representation. The Infanta enjoyed great popularity in Spain, especially because she did not have the seriousness of character of her Habsburg ancestors, she knew how to be cheerful and charming like her mother, who was also very popular.

On 12 July 1651, the new Queen gave birth to her first child, a daughter named Margaret Theresa. Maria Theresa became her godmother and the two half-sisters remained very close, particularly through correspondence, until Margaret Theresa's death in 1673.

The birth of her half-brother Philip Prospero, Prince of Asturias on 30 November 1657 marked a turning point for Maria Theresa, who was no longer the heiress presumptive to the Spanish throne and found herself in second position. The reaction of the young Infanta, who reportedly nearly choked on an egg with rage when she was told of the birth of the heir to the throne, seems to prove her desire to seize the Spanish crown. From this point, the relationship between Maria Theresa and her stepmother became strained.

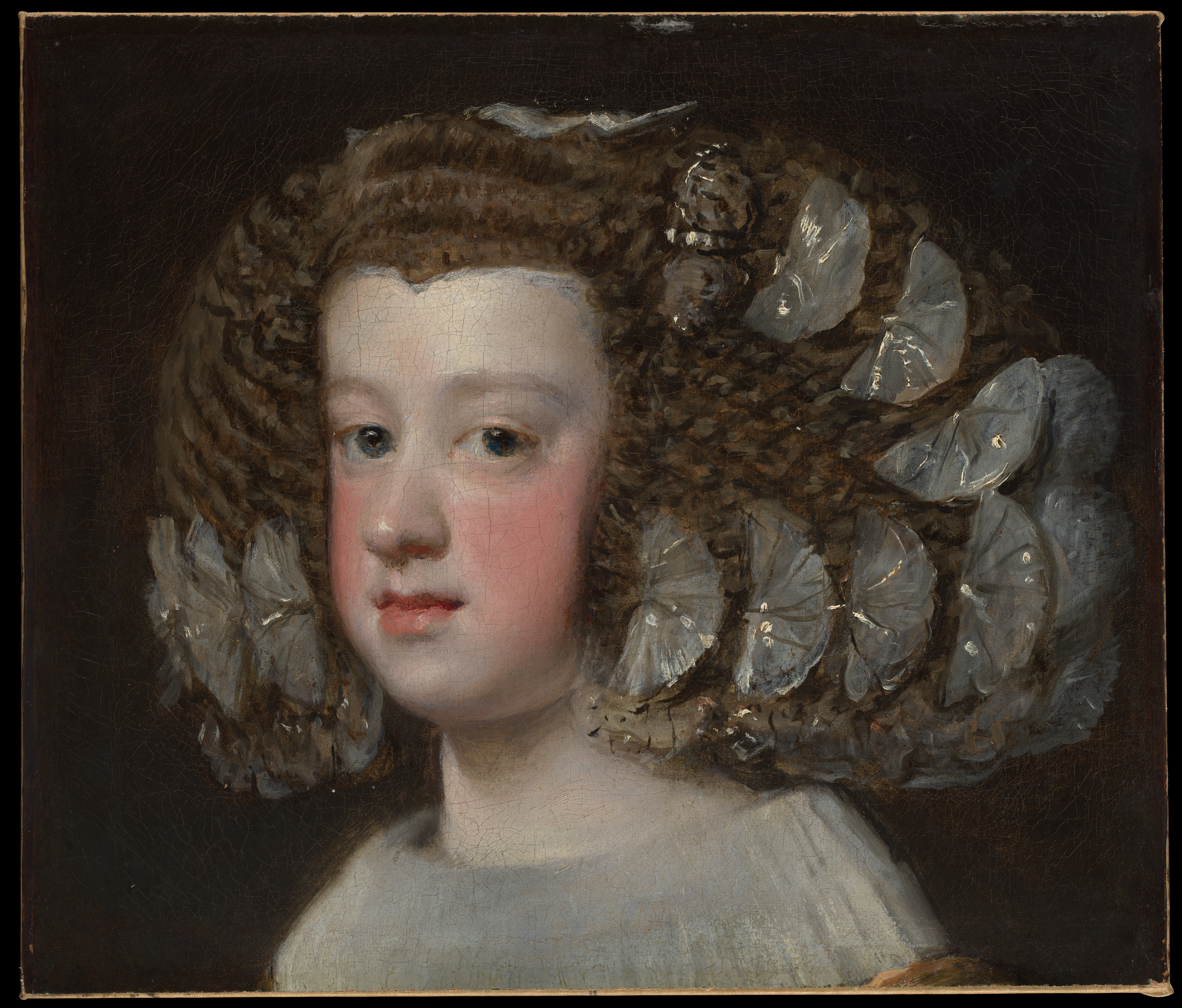
Portrait by Velázquez, c. 1651-1654

=== Treaty of the Pyrenees ===
After the birth of her half-brother, it was possible to find a husband for the Infanta without risking upsetting the Spanish monarchy. For the same reasons that had led her father to remarry within the House of Habsburg, Maria Theresa was for a time promised to her first cousin (and brother of her stepmother), Archduke Ferdinand, elected King of the Romans, and then, upon his death, to his brother Archduke Leopold, future Holy Roman Emperor. Although Maria Theresa had no real say in her own marriage, she hinted several times to her father that she was not interested in these matches and that she preferred to become Queen of France or retire to a convent.

Fortunately for Maria Theresa, the vagaries of politics prevented this union from coming to fruition. Indeed, the Kingdom of Spain and the Kingdom of France had been at war since 1635. In 1658, as war with France began to wind down, a union between the royal families of Spain and France was proposed as a means to secure peace.

Maria Theresa and the French King were double first cousins: Louis XIV's father was Louis XIII, who was the brother of Maria Theresa's mother, while her father was brother to Anne of Austria, Louis XIV's mother. Spanish procrastination led to a scheme in which France's chief minister, Cardinal Mazarin, pretended to seek a marriage for his master with Margaret Yolande of Savoy. When Philip IV heard of a meeting at Lyon between the Houses of France and Savoy in November 1658, he reputedly exclaimed of the Franco-Savoyard union that "it cannot be, and will not be". The Spanish King then sent a special envoy to the French court to open negotiations for peace and a royal marriage, who reportedly told Cardinal Mazarin: "the Savoyard marriage is not worthy of the King of France; Philip IV King of Spain proposes his daughter, the Infanta Maria Theresa of Austria, who has all the qualities to become the wife of Louis XIV".

The negotiations for the marriage contract were intense. Eager to prevent a union of the two countries or crowns, especially one in which Spain would be subservient to France, the diplomats sought to include a renunciation clause that would deprive Maria Theresa and her children of any rights to the Spanish succession. A marriage contract was eventually arranged in November 1659 as one of the provisions of the Treaty of the Pyrenees. The contract specified that Maria Theresa was to renounce all claims to Spanish territory for herself and all her descendants. Mazarin and Lionne, however, made the renunciation conditional on the full payment of a Spanish dowry of 500,000 écus. As it turned out, Spain, impoverished and bankrupt after decades of war, was unable to pay such a dowry, and France (who never received the agreed upon sum), therefore considered that Maria Theresa still had her rights of succession to the Spanish throne, which caused the War of Devolution (1667-1668).

=== Marriage ===
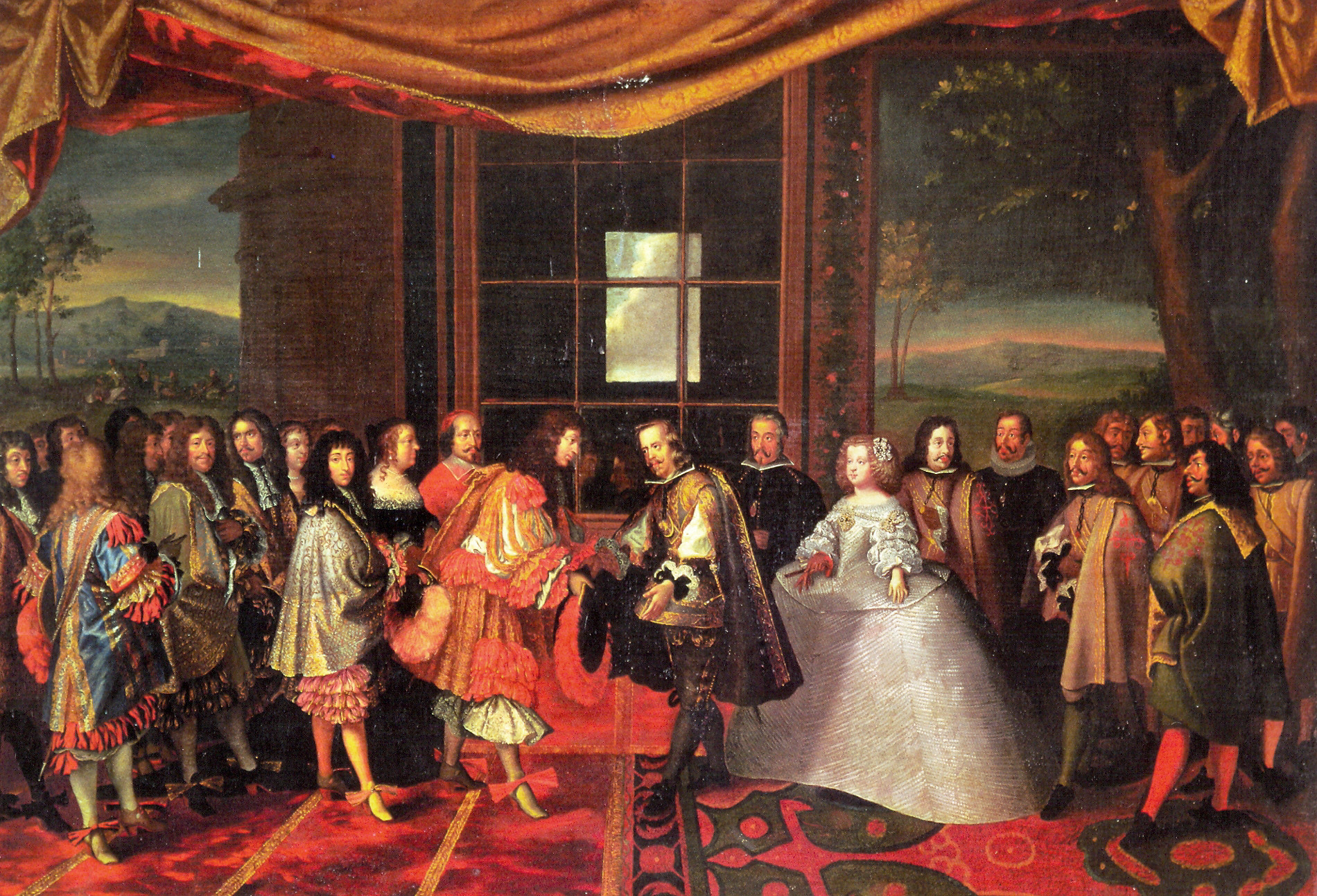
Meeting on the Isle of Pheasants, June 1660; Maria Theresa is handed over to the French and her husband by proxy, Louis XIV

On 2 June 1660, Maria Theresa was married by proxy to Louis XIV at Fuenterrabia. Luis Méndez de Haro acted as bridegroom. On 7 June her father and the entire Spanish court accompanied her to the Isle of Pheasants on the border in the Bidassoa river, that serves as the border between France and Spain. There she met her husband for the first time, as well as the French royal family and court, who became fond of her.

Maria Theresa then said goodbye to her father, both knowing that they would never see each other again; their farewells were deeply emotional, so much so that Louis XIV and his brother Philip of Orléans also shed a few tears. But Philip IV insisted to his daughter that she was now French, saying: "You must forget that you were an infanta and remember only that you are Queen of France".

The marriage of Louis XIV and Maria Theresa of Austria took place on 9 June 1660 at the recently rebuilt church of Saint Jean the Baptist in Saint-Jean-de-Luz, a town near the border between Spain and France where she stayed at the Joanoenia house, now called the "House of the Infanta"). While the French King wanted to consummate the marriage as quickly as possible, Maria Theresa initially expressed her hesitations to her mother-in-law Anne of Austria about the idea of sleeping with her husband immediately. But after the couple arrived at their intended house, the bride announced that the King was waiting for her and, already half undressed, she urged her ladies-in-waiting to finish undressing her. The next morning, both spouses seemed completely satisfied.

Later, after her marriage, Maria Theresa was asked one day if she had felt any girlish inclinations while she was still in Spain. "But no, of course not," she answered candidly, "there was only one King and he was my father!".

== At the French court ==
=== Arrival in Paris ===
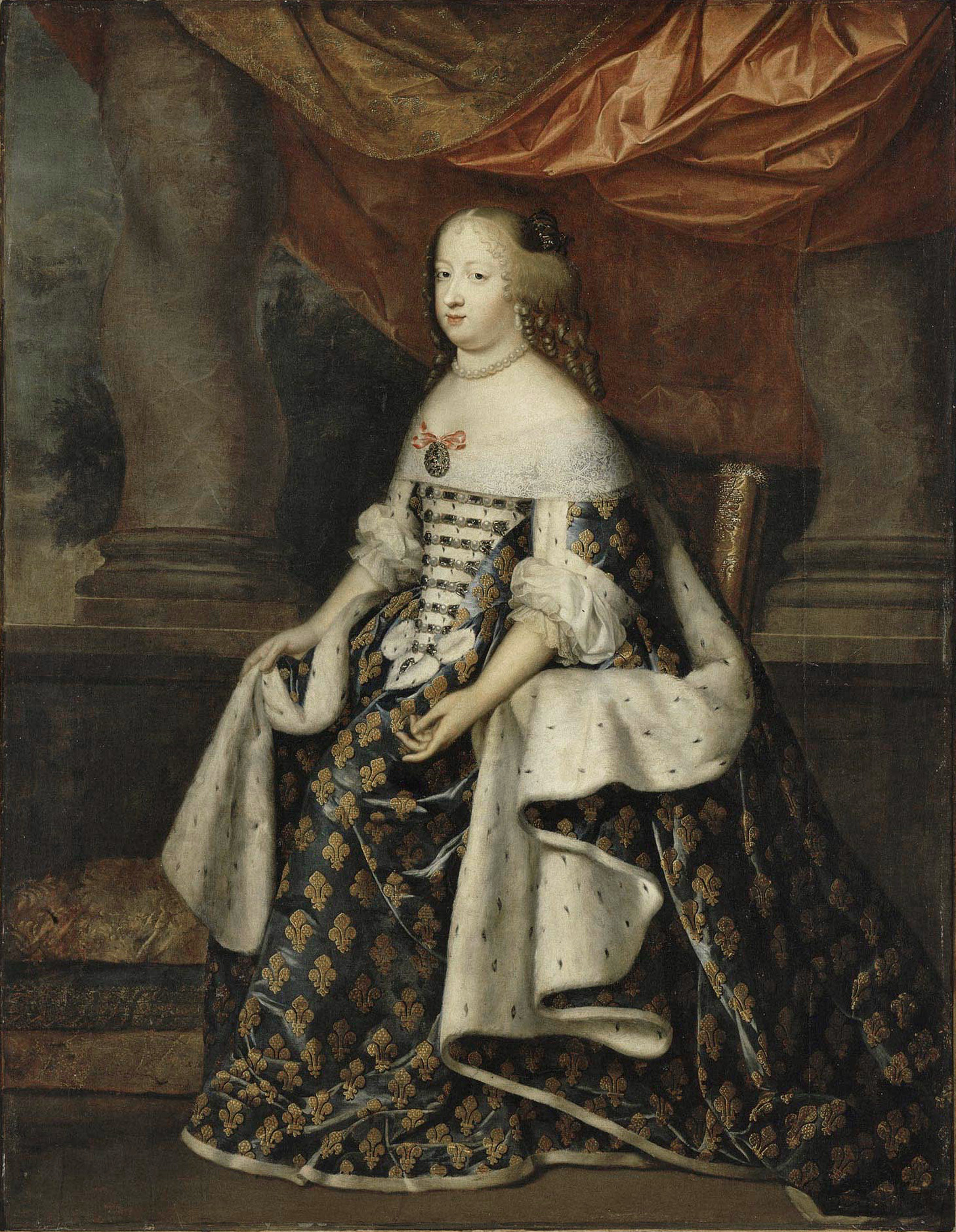
Queen Maria Theresa, attributed to Charles Beaubrun, c. 1660–1661

On 26 August 1660, the newlyweds made the traditional Joyous Entry into Paris, where the Queen was greeted by the nobility, ecclesiastical dignitaries and professors from the Sorbonne. The royal couple was acclaimed in front of hundreds of thousands of spectators who had come to attend the ceremony. Maria Theresa made a very good impression both by her appearance and by her character. Once installed at the court of France, at the time located at the Louvre, her mother-in-law (and paternal aunt), Anne of Austria, took her under her wing. Maria Theresa learned with her the duties of the Queen and the customs of the country, as well as the French language. She attained a good command of French, but retained a strong Spanish accent until the end of her life.

Anne of Austria, Queen Mother, cared for the young Queen as if she were her own daughter and attempted to protect her from court intrigues. A close and mutual friendship developed. Maria Theresa often retreated to her mother-in-law's circle, where she could speak Spanish and drink hot chocolate, away from the eyes of the court. Together, they prayed, did charitable works, made donations to the poor, and visited monasteries and churches. Some courtiers criticized Anne for being too protective of Maria Theresa and thus developing her natural inclination toward withdrawal.

The first time the Queen saw the Palace of Versailles was on 25 October 1660. It was then only a modest royal residence that had once been Louis XIII's hunting lodge, not far from Paris. At this time, as during the first months of the marriage, Louis XIV was highly affectionate and attentive to his wife, reportedly commanding the Grand Maréchal du Logis that "the Queen and himself were never to be set apart, no matter how small the house in which they might be lodging". However, his devotion was short-lived and he promptly began pursuing Louise de La Vallière. In addition, Maria Theresa had difficulty getting used to the French court, whose etiquette was very different from that of Madrid—where courtiers were not even allowed to touch her dress—and often found it difficult to understand French pleasures and humor. Embarrassed by this new proximity, the young Queen had difficulty finding her place there and willingly withdrew to her apartments with her circle of intimates. She clung to her mother-in-law, whom she affectionately referred to as “tia”. Very devout, Maria Theresa enjoyed long masses and the celebration of traditional Spanish fêtes. Aside from prayer, she spent much of her free time playing cards and gambling. Maria Theresa played little part in political affairs, although she briefly acted as regent in 1667 while her husband was away on campaigns on the frontier.

=== Birth of the Dauphin and first rivalries ===
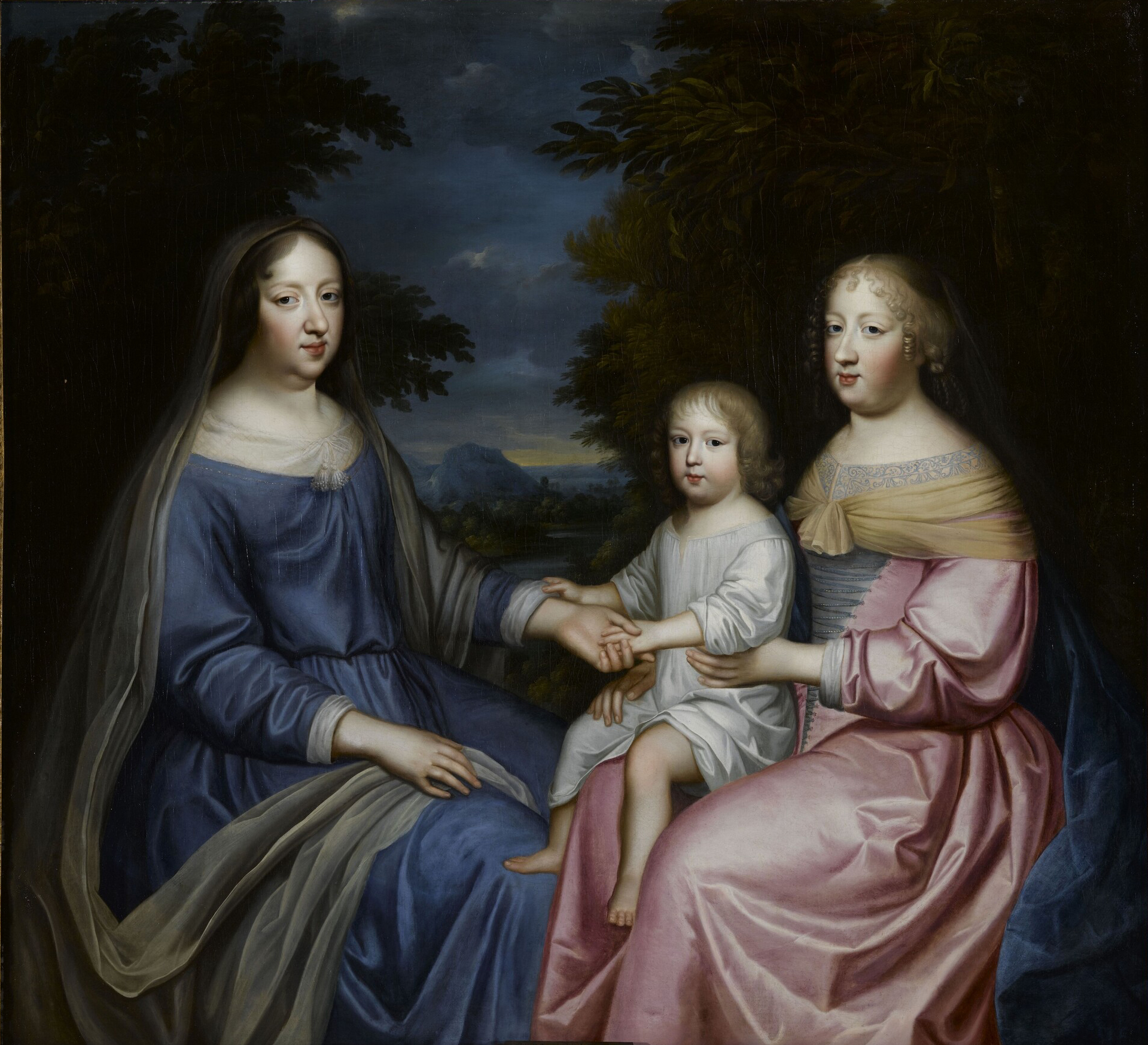
Two queens of France: Anne of Austria with her niece and daughter-in-law, Maria Theresa, and the latter's son Louis, attributed to Simon Renard de St. André, 1665

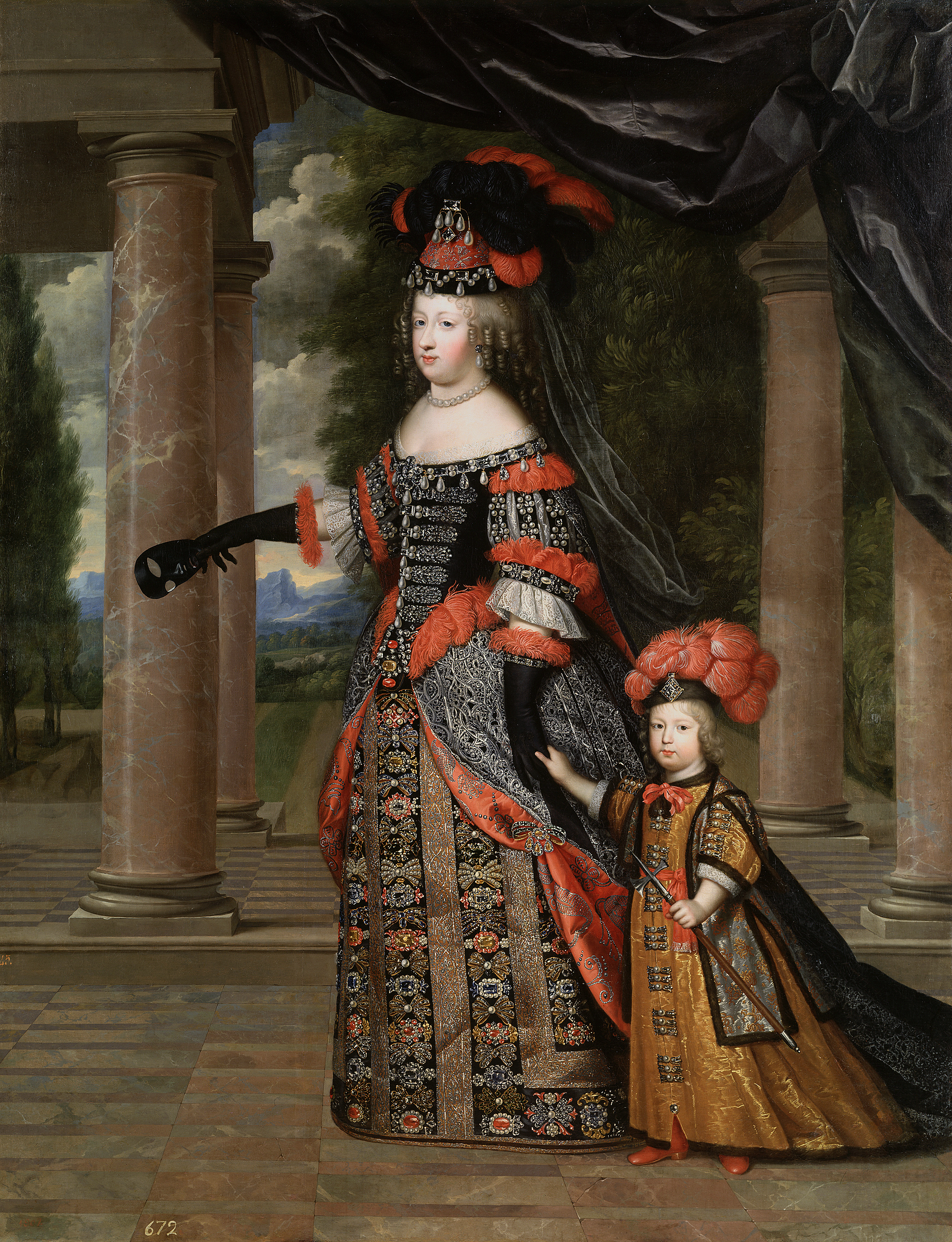
Queen Marie Thérèse and her son the Dauphin of France in Polish costume, dated c. 1663 by Charles Beaubrun

At the beginning of 1661, the Queen's first pregnancy was announced, to the great joy of the court and the city. The Queen then remained in bed most of the time and traveled exclusively in a sedan chair so as not to harm the royal child. The young Queen was afraid of dying like her mother, who had died following a miscarriage.

While the Queen was carrying her pregnancy to term, the King's brother, Philippe I, Duke of Orléans, married their cousin, Princess Henrietta of England. The young exile had grown into an attractive and witty young woman, and it was no secret that her husband was uninterested in women. From the summer of 1661, Louis XIV had a relationship that sparked gossip with his sister-in-law and cousin who, to cut short the rumors and avoid incurring the wrath of the queen mother, suggested to the King that he court one of her maids of honour: Louise de La Vallière. The King took to it and fell in love with the young girl whose shyness was matched only by her sincerity. At first, an attempt was made to hide Louis XIV's infidelities from Maria Theresa, in order to avoid an argument that could harm the unborn royal child. But suspecting that something was going on, the Queen managed to get one of her ladies-in-waiting to confess by asking a number of questions. She then complained to Anne of Austria, who intervened with the King, without success.

On 1 November 1661, Maria Theresa gave birth to the long-awaited Dauphin, Louis of France, fulfilling her primary duty as Queen. The birth was difficult and people even feared the worst for the Queen. Louis XIV assisted her throughout, as he would for her later births. He was very afraid for his wife's life. Madame de Motteville wrote: "While she was in great pain, the King seemed so afflicted and so deeply filled with pain that he left no room for doubt that the love he had for her was no more in his heart than in that of others". Maria Theresa's half-brother, Philip Prospero, Prince of Asturias, died the same day, leaving her again as heiress presumptive of the Spanish throne. But fortunately for the Catholic Monarchy, five days later (6 November 1661) Queen Maria Anna of Spain gave birth to another son, Charles. However, the new heir was deformed and sickly.

After giving birth, Maria Theresa was very saddened by the flourishing relationship between her husband and Louise de La Vallière. The King initially attempted to keep his constant infidelity hidden, but became more overt as time progressed. Maria Theresa spent a lot of her time crying but tried to keep a good face by participating in balls and shows, despite her great shyness. The Queen would also show a keen interest in comedy, particularly Spanish comedy. To please her, the King would have it performed quite frequently.

Maria Theresa spent much of her time caring for the sick, the poor and the disinherited. She regularly visited the hospital at Saint-Germain-en-Laye, and even relieved the "poor shameful" by secretly granting dowries to the daughters of the poor nobility. She was also the last Queen of France to lead the monarchical parade.

Maria Theresa gave birth on 18 November 1662 a second child, a daughter named Anne-Élisabeth after her two grandmothers. Born sickly, the little princess died one month later, on 30 December, to the consternation of the royal family. This was the beginning of a string of children that would die in infancy.

=== A difficult cohabitation ===
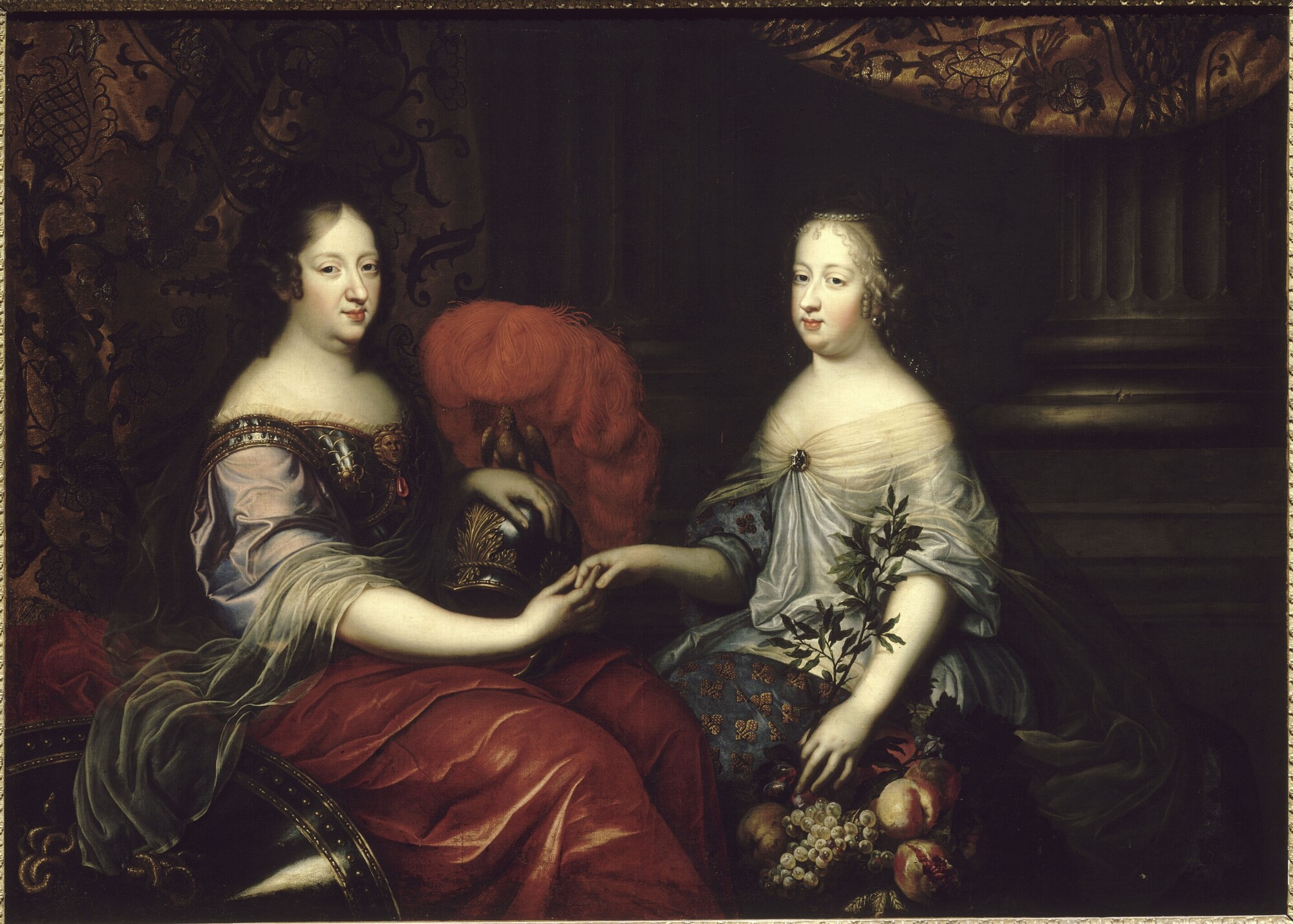
Anne of Austria with Maria Theresa by André Simon Renard de Saint, 1664

Louis XIV continued his extramarital affairs, and Maria Theresa did not sit idly by. She then used her ladies-in-waiting, particularly her Spanish servants, to spy on her husband and thus find out how he went about visiting his mistresses (indeed, the King hid his adulterous relationships so as not to shock his mother Anne of Austria). Maria Theresa's Première dame d'honneur, Suzanne de Navailles, then tried to prevent the King from accessing the bedroom of his conquests, even going so far as to place bars on the secret entrances to the bedrooms. Louis XIV became furious and banished her from the court, despite the strong protests of Maria Theresa and Anne of Austria.

The first construction campaign of the Palace of Versailles (1664–1668) began with The Pleasures of the Enchanted Island of 1664, a week-long celebration at Versailles held officially in honor of the two Queens of France: the mother and the wife of Louis XIV. In reality, the festivities were dedicated to Louise de La Vallière. During said festivities, Maria Theresa would venture into acting for the first time.

On 17 September 1665, Philip IV of Spain died, leaving the throne to his son Charles II. Maria Theresa approved of Louis XIV's actions (who claimed a share of the Spanish inheritance in the War of Devolution) and did not seem concerned that France was waging war against the native country of Maria Theresa.

The death of Anne of Austria on 20 January 1666 was a major blow for Maria Theresa; she lost an important supporter at court. Indeed, when there was a dispute within the royal couple, the Queen Mother often took the side of her niece and daughter-in-law.

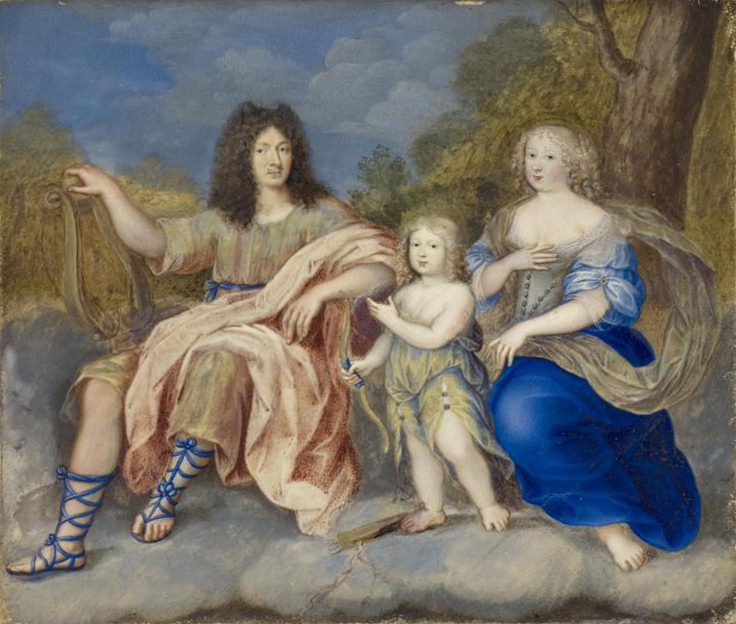
Louis XIV with Queen Marie Thérèse and the Dauphin, by Joseph Werner the younger

Maria Theresa suffered greatly from the King's adulteries. After the death of Anne of Austria, Louis XIV no longer took the trouble to hide his affairs from the Queen, and soon began a relationship with Madame de Montespan in the autumn of 1666. Her pride, arrogance and lively mind contrasted with his first mistress, the sensitive Louise de La Vallière, who took care to avoid hurting the Queen. Maria Theresa could not resist the new favourite for long and had to slip away after a few outbursts of anger. Although Louis XIV reprimanded Madame de Montespan when her behaviour at court too flagrantly disrespected the Queen's position, yet often displayed a level of indulgence toward her that surpassed his treatment of the queen.

A period of cohabitation then began between the Queen and the two favorites. Louis XIV forced Maria Theresa to take Louise de La Vallière and Madame de Montespan as ladies-in-waiting. In addition, he traveled openly with his wife and his two mistresses. Faced with this spectacle, the people murmured, mockingly or distressed: "The King is taking the three Queens for a walk". Maria Theresa then used the privileges due to her rank to make life difficult for her rivals.

Maria Theresa also suffered from the successive legitimations of her husband's natural children, which overshadowed her son the Dauphin. The Queen made numerous reproaches to her husband on his conduct, but it all was in vain.

== Resignation and Regency ==
The night of 1 March 1672 at around 10 p.m., the Queen found her only surviving daughter, Marie-Thérèse of France, born five years earlier, covered in sweat. The little princess died shortly after in her arms, taken by tuberculosis. Her parents had great hope and saw in her a future Queen of Spain. Deeply affected by the death of their daughter, the Queen turned even more towards religion while the King decreed mourning throughout the kingdom.

During the Franco-Dutch War in 1672, Louis XIV entrusted his wife with the reins of power. During the regency, Maria Theresa received the King's letters, who kept her informed of the advancement of the troops and she then transmitted the news to the ministers. She assumed the function of supreme administrator of state finances, could raise troops and received ambassadors and correspondence from foreign monarchs. The Queen also presided over the council of ministers.

Her contemporaries were astonished by the Queen's diligence during the regency. Jacques-Bénigne Bossuet would say: "This regency did not last long but served to prove the Queen's ability in business, and all the confidence that the King had in her".

During her regency, Maria Theresa gave birth on 14 June 1672 to her sixth and last child, Louis-François of France, created at birth Duke of Anjou, who would die prematurely only four months later. In 1675 the Queen would suffer a miscarriage, which was her last pregnancy, despite the continuity of her marital life with Louis XIV.

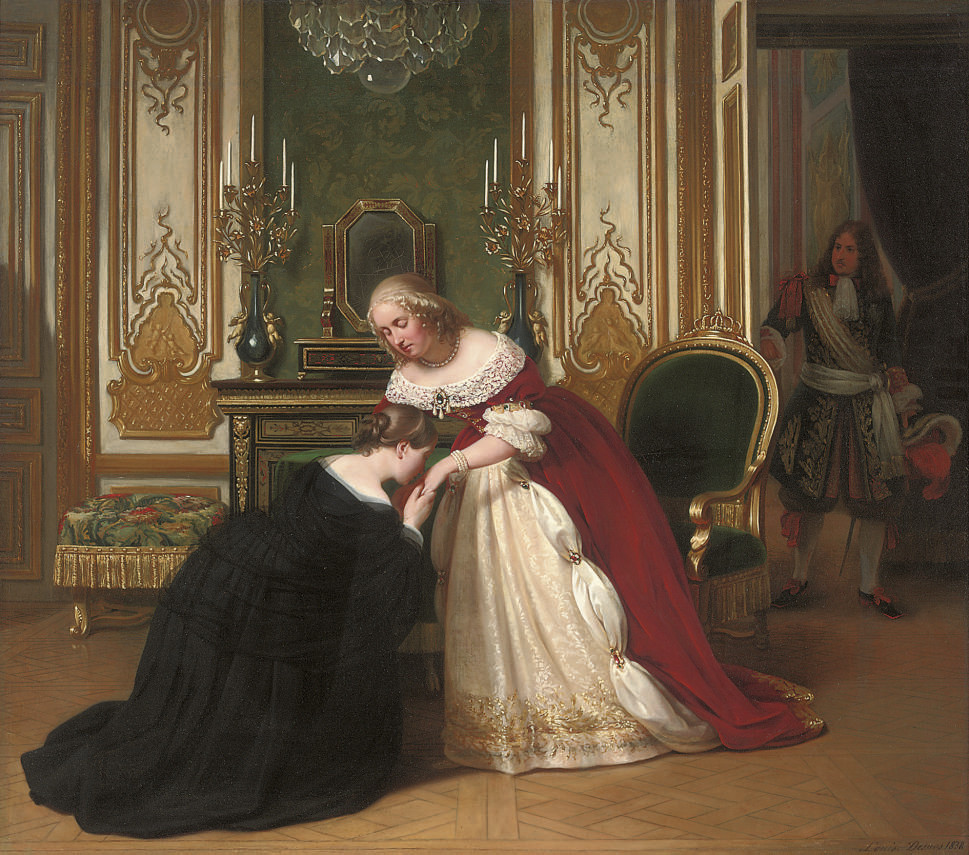
Maria Theresa of Austria forgives Louise de la Vallière, by Louise Adélaïde Desnos 1838

In 1673, a suspicious letter from a lady-in-waiting of the Queen was sent to the Regent of Spain, Maria Anna of Austria, while the two countries were at war. Louis XIV, furious, decided to send away the entire Spanish retinue of the Queen. The latter was the first to be stunned and assured that she had not known about the letter. The King, knowing the character of his wife and her attachment to the interests of her adopted country, believed her.

But Maria Theresa stood up to Louis XIV and asked to keep one of her Spanish ladies, Felipa Abarca; she was her illegitimate half-sister, daughter of Philip IV, born from one of his several affairs and who was married to a Frenchman. Thanks to the unexpected support of Madame de Montespan, this lady was able to stay.

In 1674, to the great astonishment of the court, Louise de La Vallière, her husband's first favourite, converted and repented, publicly asked for Maria Theresa's forgiveness before retiring to the Carmelite convent in the Faubourg Saint-Jacques. The Queen granted her forgiveness. She would often visit Sister Louise de la Miséricorde thereafter.

Maria Theresa's jealousy of her husband's favourites gradually gave way to resignation and she ended up withdrawing into herself. She bore her fate with dignity and made no further scenes for her husband, who continued to do her all the honours due to his position and ensured that Madame de Montespan did not disrespect her. The Queen then took refuge in religion and increasingly went to the Carmelite convent of Sainte-Thérèse, rue du Bouloi, which she had founded in 1664.

== Regain of favor ==
The Affair of the Poisons occurred in 1679 and Madame de Montespan and other women of the high nobility were worried. Rumours circulated that the royal mistress had participated in black masses and that Montespan had attempted to take the life of the king. The Chambre Ardente was created and the affair was hushed up. To the great relief of Maria Theresa, Madame de Montespan gradually fell from grace after more than ten years of informal rule.

That same year, the Queen, given her correspondence, would play a diplomatic role in the context of the marriage of her niece by marriage, Marie Louise d'Orléans with her half-brother King Charles II of Spain.

On 7 March 1680, the King hastily married the Dauphin to Maria Anna Victoria of Bavaria. Louis XIV did not tell his wife about this, as he was busy with other women. Maria Theresa was upset because she wanted to marry her son to Archduchess Maria Antonia of Austria, only surviving daughter of her half-sister, Empress Margaret Theresa. The Queen felt a certain jealousy towards her daughter-in-law, especially since she found that the festivities given for her wedding were less grandiose than those that had been done for the Dauphine. Over time however, the Queen would become closer to the Dauphine.

The governess of Madame of Montespan's illegitimate children by Louis XIV, Madame de Maintenon, came to supplant her mistress in the King's affections. At first, she resisted the King's advances and encouraged him to bestow more attention on his long-neglected wife. From the summer of 1680, Louis XIV became closer to Maria Theresa, whom he had publicly neglected: "The Queen is very happy at court", Madame de Sévigné would remark mockingly. The Queen, filled with happiness and moved by the unexpected attentions of her fickle husband, would say: "God has raised up Madame de Maintenon to give me back the heart of the King! Never has he treated me with as much tenderness as since he has listened to her!". As a sign of gratitude, Maria Theresa then showed herself very benevolent towards Madame de Maintenon (who was secretly the King's mistress, and after the Queen's death, would become Louis XIV's second, although officially secret, wife).

Between 1680 and 1682, Louis XIV began to persecute Protestants, particularly the Huguenots. The Queen, although deeply Catholic, opposed these measures and said to her husband: "You don't have to kill them, just pray for them". But despite her opposition, the persecutions continued, particularly in Béarn, Guyenne, Gascony, Limousin and Languedoc.

On 6 May 1682, the court settled permanently in Versailles. Maria Theresa soon became grandmother for the first time, with the birth of Louis, Duke of Burgundy on 6 August 1682. She finally began to find her place as Queen and to be comfortable with it after the disgrace of Madame de Montespan.

=== Death ===
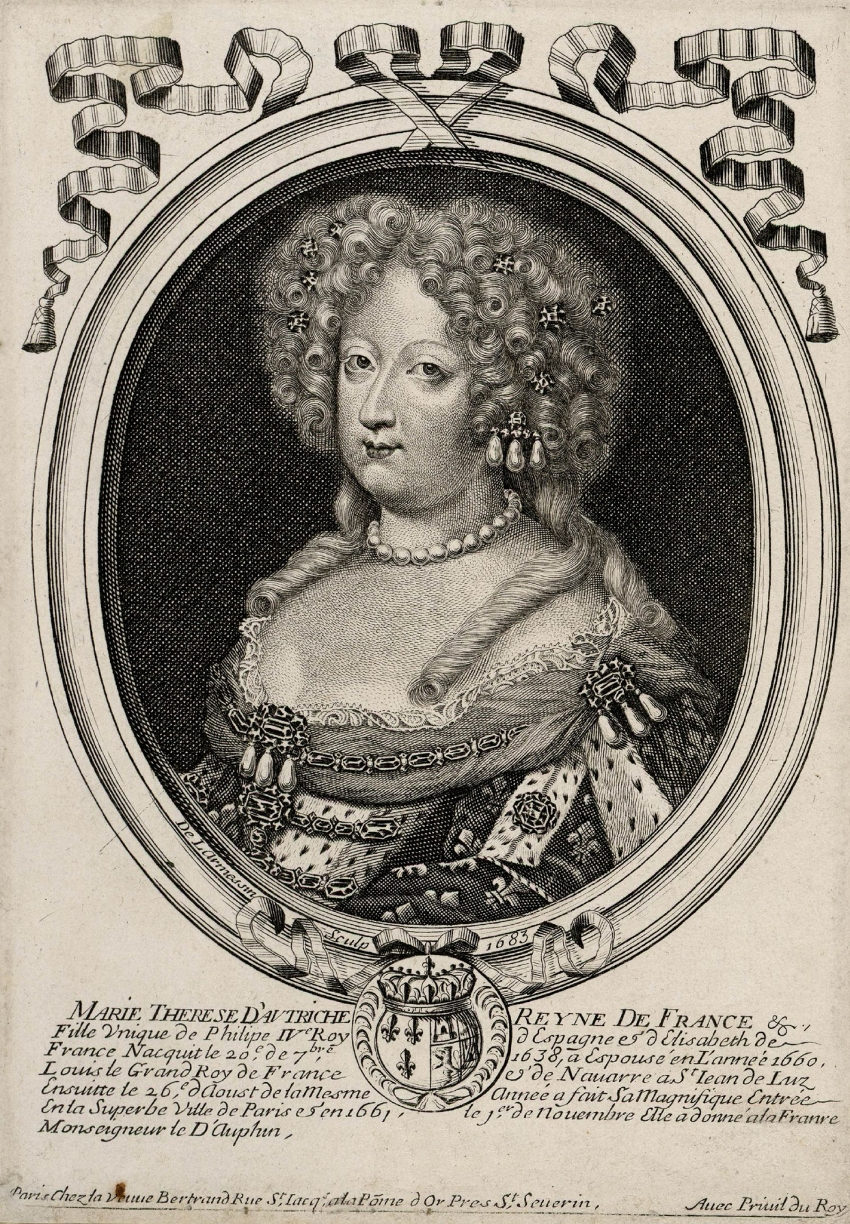
Engraving of Queen Maria Theresa in 1683, by Nicolas Larmessin

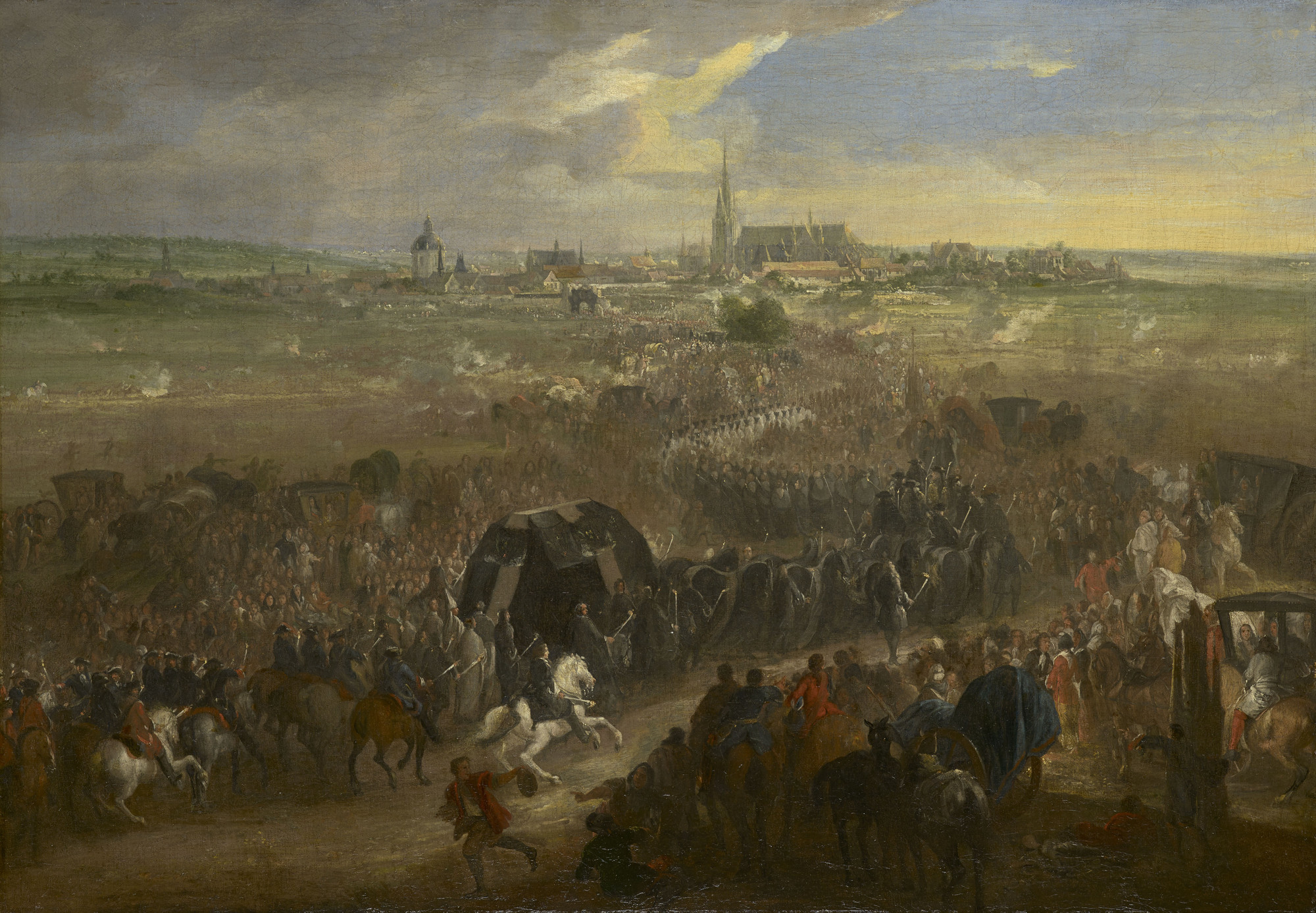
The Funeral of Marie Therese, Queen of France, 10 August 1683, by Adam Frans van der Meulen

Queen Maria Theresa didn't enjoy this renewed favour for long. On 20 July 1683, the royal couple returned from a royal tour of the fortresses built by Vauban in Burgundy. The Queen was reported to be in excellent health, although she had gained minimal weight; she was expected to be delighted by the progress of the work on the gardens of Versailles.

A few days later, Maria Theresa complained of fever and no longer left her apartments. An abscess was discovered on her left armpit. Antoine d'Aquin, the Premier médecin du roi, and Guy-Crescent Fagon took charge of the purplish and purulent abscess. The King's physician convinced the Queen's physician of the urgent need for bloodletting. A surgeon to the Queen, Pierre Gervais, opposed it, saying that it would be the death of his mistress. The Queen was bled all the same and the abscess, instead of being incised, was vainly fought with moist plasters, remedies that weakened her.

On 30 July 1683, Maria Theresa, feeling increasingly ill, requested the Blessed Sacrament, but the doctors administered emetic wine to her. At 3 p.m. the Queen succumbed before there was time to administer the anointing of the sick. Her last words were: "Since I have been Queen, I have had only one happy day."

Marc-Antoine Charpentier composed dramatic motets H.409, H.189, H.331 for her grandiose funeral and Jean-Baptiste Lully performed his Dies irae and De profundis, while Bossuet delivered the funeral oration.

Upon her death, Louis XIV said: "This is the first chagrin she has ever given me". Barely two months after these grand ceremonies, the King secretly married his last mistress, whom he nicknamed in private "Sainte Françoise": Madame de Maintenon. The latter wore mourning and affected to show a crestfallen expression, while the King almost immediately resumed his entertainment.

When the royal tombs in the Basilica of Saint-Denis were ransacked during the French Revolution, they were opened and looted on 15 October 1793, and the remains buried in a common grave outside the church. During the Bourbon Restoration, after 1815, the bones and ashes buried in the two graves outside the basilica were recovered and, no longer able to be attributed by name, were interred together in an ossuary in the crypt.

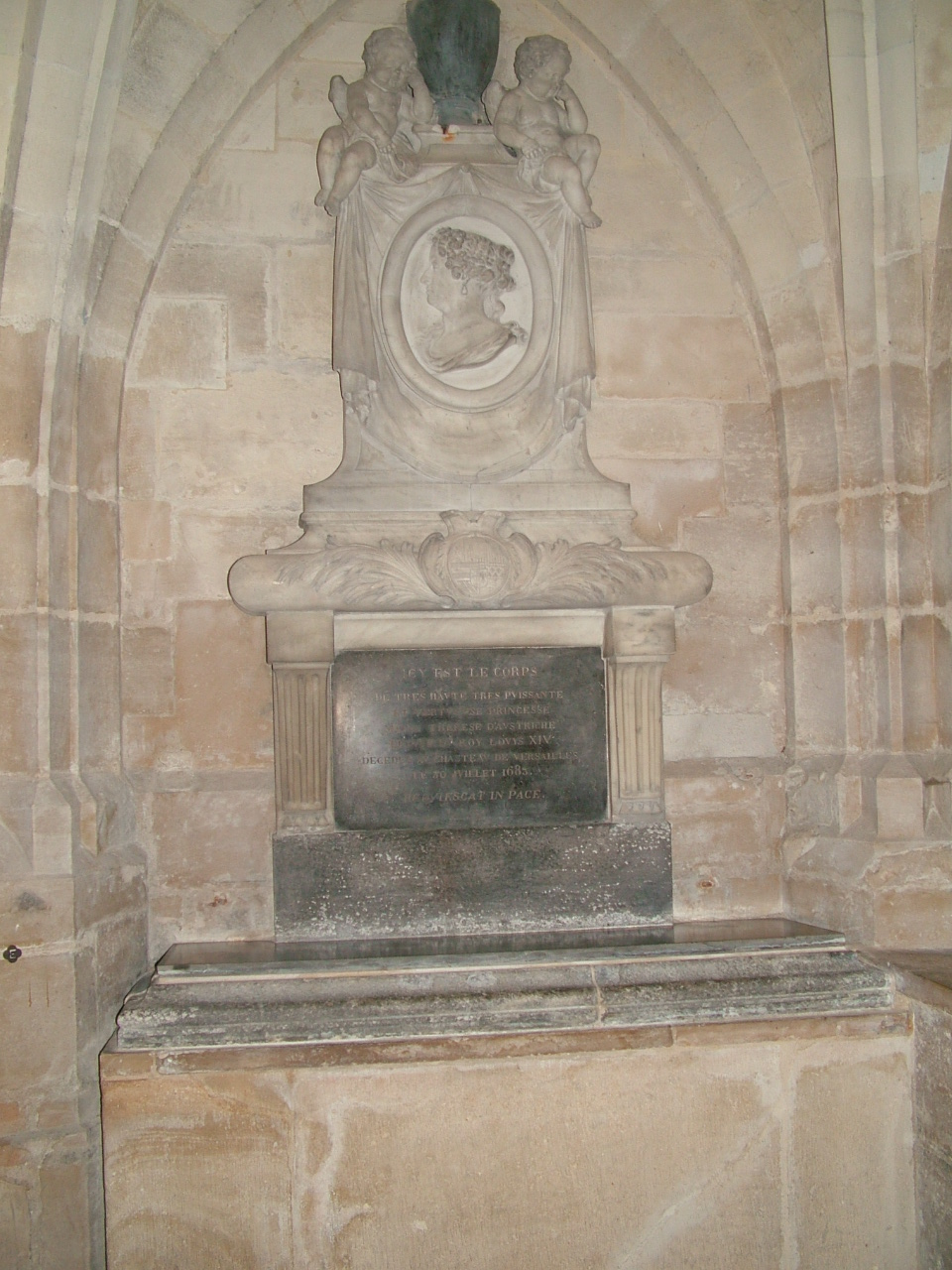
Marie-Thérèse's burial site at the Basilica of St Denis, where most of France's monarchs are buried

== Profile and characteristics ==
=== Personality ===
Maria Theresa was described as shy, charitable, greedy, and superstitious. Of a self-effacing nature, she spent most of her free time with her ladies-in-waiting who had followed her from Spain, her dwarfs, her little dogs and her chocolate. She wore very high heels to compensate for her small height, but they often made her fall. However, she persisted in wearing them, which earned her the mockery of the courtiers.

Unlike her husband, she was not interested in politics but preferred acts of devotion and playing cards with her ladies-in-waiting. Her taste for gambling gradually became an addiction, and she began to lose considerable sums of money, sometimes forcing her husband to intervene.

Maria Theresa was deeply in love with Louis XIV and did everything to be a devoted wife. She complied with the fashion of the French court to please the King and she followed him on his travels. Louis XIV was grateful for her loyalty and even at the height of his love affairs, he showed her a lot of friendship and always ended his nights in her bed. Moreover, at each party the royal couple opened the ball with a few dance steps, although Maria Theresa quickly withdrew due to her clumsiness.

Despite her shyness, the Queen did not give in. She stood up to her stepmother Maria Anna of Austria at the Spanish court, and although she mostly followed the King's decisions, when they went against her interests, she became angry. She also resisted her husband's mistresses as best she could by recalling her rank and origins.

Maria Theresa took her role as mother seriously, which was rare at the time. She supported Bossuet, who was in charge of the Dauphin's education, as evidenced by their correspondence: "Do not tolerate anything, Sir, in the conduct of my son that could offend the sanctity of the religion he professes, and the majesty of the throne for which he is destined".

The Queen feared spirits. At night, even with the king at her side, a woman would tell her stories to put her to sleep and hold her hand all night. This woman remained present even when the king wanted to fulfill his marital duty.

Louis XIV had absolute confidence in his wife, whom he knew to be loyal. Unlike other queens of foreign origin, such as Anne of Austria in her youth, Maria Theresa never plotted against the interests of France.

=== Physical ===
Maria Theresa was a small, plump woman who was well within the beauty standards of the time, namely fair skin and blonde hair. Thanks to her mother, a princess of the House of Bourbon, she had not inherited the typical facial features of the Spanish Habsburgs caused by generations of inbreeding (Habsburg Jaw). However, the Queen had bad teeth since she liked to eat sweets and drink hot chocolate.

Unlike Philip IV 's other legitimate children who suffered from hereditary diseases, she enjoyed good health which she maintained until her death.

=== Legend of The Black Nun of Moret ===
According to a hypothesis developed by 19th century writers, including Victor Hugo, Maria Theresa had an illegitimate daughter, a black nun named Louise Marie Thérèse and known as La Mauresse de Moret (The Black Nun of Moret). She claimed to be of royal blood and this woman received much honor from Louis XIV for a simple nun. The theory is that the Queen's third child, Marie-Anne of France, was black. The father was said to be a black dwarf of the Queen, "Nabo". To hide the scandal, the girl was declared dead but she was in reality entrusted to a convent.

However, it is now accepted that Maria Theresa could not have been the mother of the Black Nun of Moret. Indeed, with the very strict and religious education she received, it was unthinkable for her to have a child with anyone other than the King. In addition, the births of queens took place in public, and no foreign ambassador mentioned a black girl. It is obvious that if the Queen had really given birth to a black girl, the news would have spread throughout Europe through these ambassadors.

In reality, Marie-Anne was born following a very difficult delivery for the Queen. Following an argument with Louis XIV, she gave birth at only 8 months of pregnancy on 16 November 1664. The little princess, very frail and premature, was purple due to breathing difficulties (which is at the origin of the rumors that she was black). Mother and daughter were both victims of violent convulsions. It was then feared that both would die, and it was finally little Marie-Anne who died of a convulsion attack.

Today, historians agree that the Black Nun of Moret was either an illegitimate daughter of Louis XIV or a child of black servants, who had been sponsored by the royal couple.

== Cultural posterity ==
In posterity, Maria Theresa of Austria, having died prematurely, was eclipsed by the long reign of her husband Louis XIV. Moreover, after so many writings on the latter's mistresses, it was not until 1992 that the first biographical book dedicated to her appeared: "Madame Louis XIV: Maria Theresa of Austria", by Bruno Cortequisse. Subsequently, interest in this figure in French history continued to inspire historians on many occasions, her political imprint as Queen of France was a source of interest, notably in the work of 2005, "The Regency of Maria Theresa (April 23–July 31, 1672)", by Bernard Barbiche.

== Issue ==
Maria Theresa married her double first cousin Louis XIV in 1660. The couple had six children, only one of whom survived to adulthood:

1. Louis, Grand Dauphin (1 November 1661 – 14 April 1711) married Maria Anna Victoria of Bavaria, had issue.
2. Anne-Élisabeth (18 November 1662 – 30 December 1662); died in infancy.
3. Marie-Anne (16 November 1664 – 26 December 1664); died in infancy.
4. Marie Thérèse (2 January 1667 – 1 March 1672); styled as Madame Royale, died at the age of five.
5. Philippe Charles (5 August 1668 – 10 July 1671); styled as Duke of Anjou, died at the age of two.
6. Louis François (14 June 1672 – 4 November 1672); styled Duke of Anjou, died in infancy.

Of her six children, only one survived her, Louis, le Grand Dauphin, the oldest one, who died in 1711. One of her younger grandsons eventually inherited her claim to the Spanish throne to become King Philip V of Spain in 1700.

== Notes ==
Maria Theresa of Spain House of Habsburg Born: 10 September 1638 Died: 30 July 1683
French royalty
Vacant Title last held by Ana of Spain	Queen consort of France; 1660 – 1683	Vacant Title next held by Maria of Poland
