= Luisa Magdalena de Jesus =

Spanish courtier (1603 – 1660)

Luisa Enríquez Manrique de Lara (1603-1660), was a Spanish courtier. She was the lady-in-waiting (junior Camarera mayor de Palacio) to the queen of Spain, Elisabeth of France, and the aya (nurse or royal governess) to Maria Theresa of Spain.

== Life ==
She was born to Luis Enríquez and Catalina Luján, and married her cousin Manuel Manrique de Lara, count de Paredes de Nava.

She was appointed lady-in-waiting to the queen in 1616, and became her favorite and personal confidante. When Elisabeth acted as regent during the war in Catalonia, Luisa Enríquez acted as the queen regent's adviser and messenger, and often delivered her orders to the ministers of state. She nursed the queen when she was sick and died in 1644. She was appointed joint royal governess to princess Maria Theresa in the queen's will, a position she shared with Inés de Zúñiga, countess de Olivares.

In 1648, she left court and became a nun. Margarita Zapata de Mendoza was to become governess to Mara Theresa after her. After this, she corresponded with the king, and their correspondence has been preserved.
