= Margarita Zapata de Mendoza =

Doña Margarita Zapata de Mendoza, countess of Priego (1616–1664), was a Spanish courtier. She was the Camarera mayor de Palacio to the infanta Maria Theresa of Spain.

== Life and career ==
She was born to Diego Zapata de Mendoza, count of Barajas, and María Sidonia Riederer de Paar. She married in 1629 to Jerónimo Garcés de Marcilla Carrillo de Mendoza, XII count of Priego (d. 1652).

She had a long career at the Spanish royal court. She served as menina (maid of honour) to the queen, Elisabeth of France, prior to her marriage. After her marriage, she served as Dama de la reina (lady-in-waiting) to the same queen. As a widow, she served as Dueña de honor to queen Mariana.

She was appointed the Aya or governess to Princess Maria Theresa, whose previous governess Luisa Magdalena de Jesus had retired. When Maria Theresa was bethrothed to king Louis XV of France and given status of queen of France while still residing at the Spanish court, she was appointed to the post of Camarera mayor de Palacio 11 April 1660, appending the departure of Maria Theresa to France.

She accompanied Maria Theresa to her wedding in France. In France, the majority of Maria Theresa's Spanish entourage was exchanged for the French eqvivalents that had been appointed for her, and consequently, the Spanish Camarera Mayor Margarita Zapata de Mendoza was replaced by the French Première dame d'honneur, the duchess Susanne de Navailles.

After the wedding, she returned to Spain, but formally retained the position of Camarera of Maria Theresa as well as its salary and status.
