= Charles Beaubrun =

French painter (1604–1692)

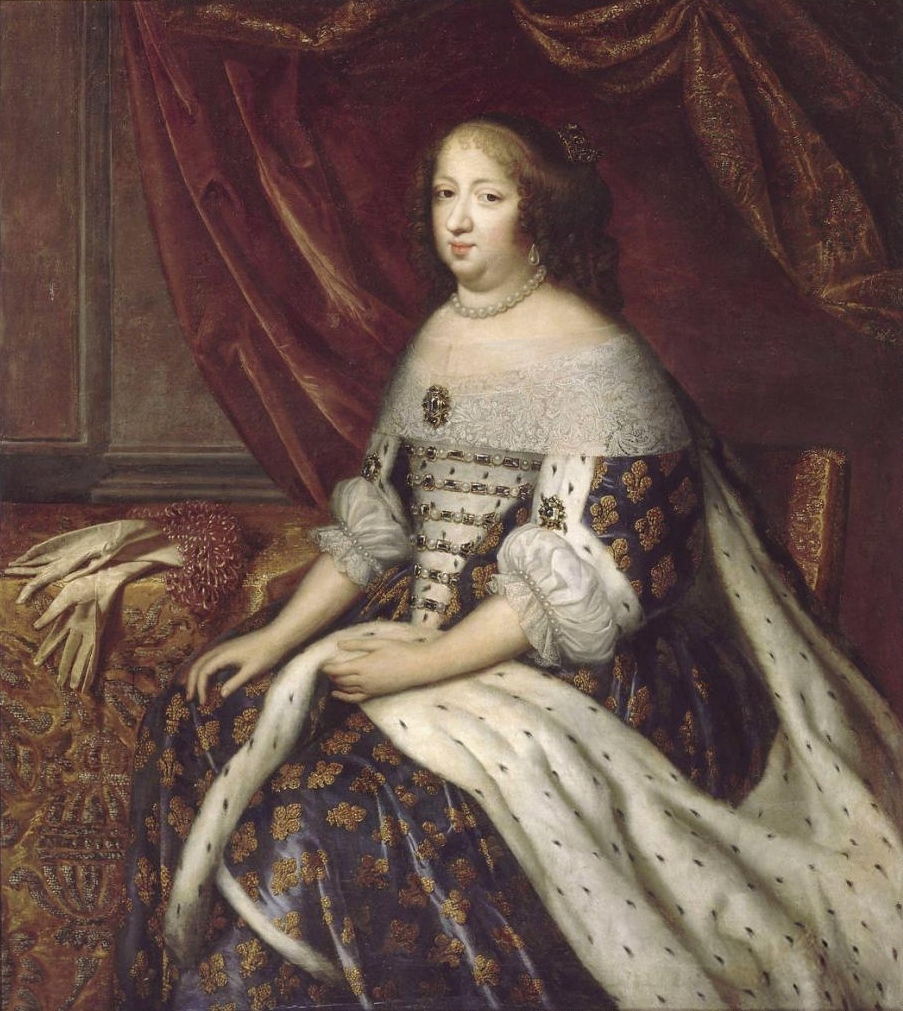
Charles Beaubrun: Portrait of Anna of Austria (1601-1666) wife of Louis XIII, 2nd quarter 17th century, oil on canvas, Châteaux de Versailles et de Trianon

Charles Beaubrun (Charles Bobrun) (1604-1692) was a French portrait painter active in Paris between 1630 and 1670.

== Life ==
Charles Beaubrun was born at Amboise, a member of a distinguished family of painters. He studied under his uncle Louis Beaubrun (d. 1627). He and his cousin Henri Beaubrun (II) (1603–1677), were portrait painters in the courts of Kings Louis XIII and Louis XIV. Some of his work is jointly attributed to Henri. His youngest brother, Michel Beaubrun (d 1642), was also a painter. Charles Beaubrun died at Paris.

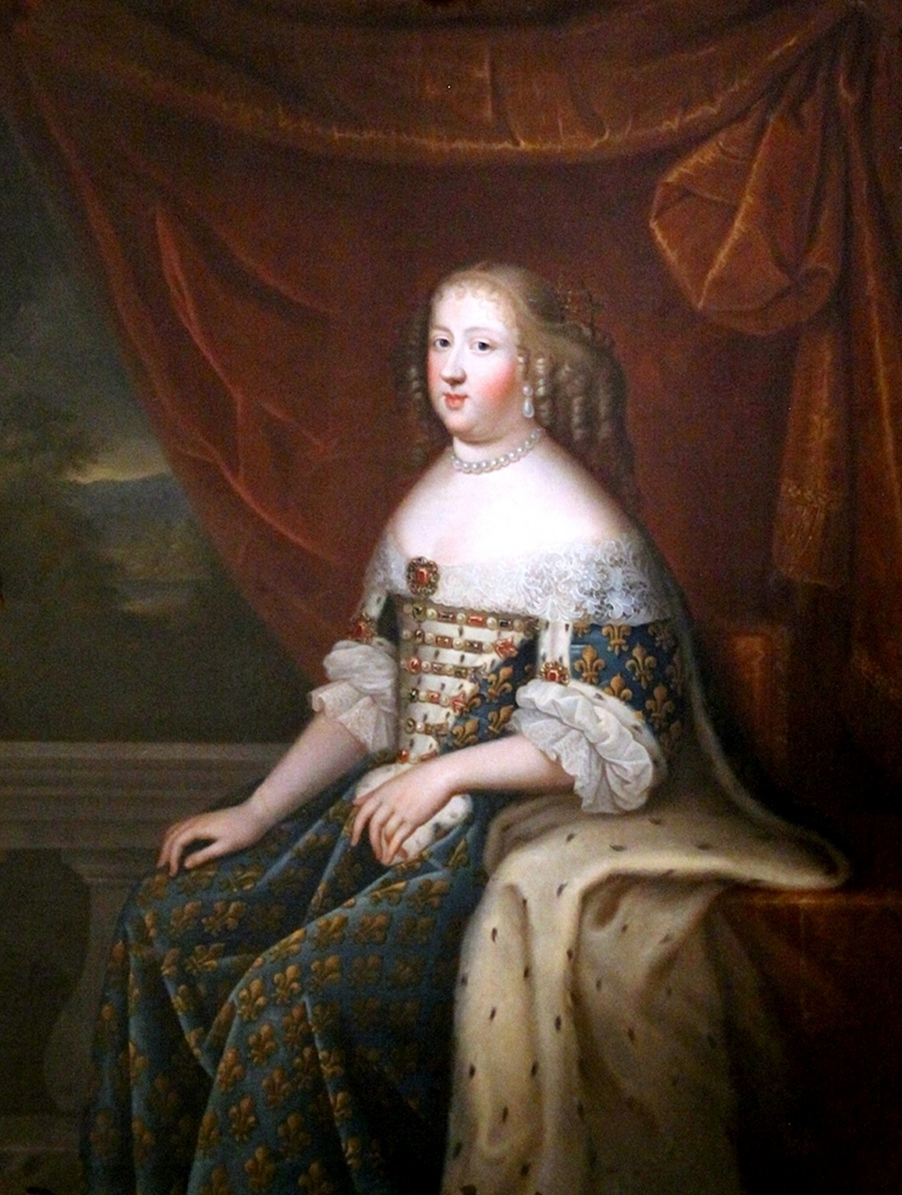
Charles Beaubrun: Portrait of Maria Theresa (1638-83), queen consort of France as wife of Louis XIV

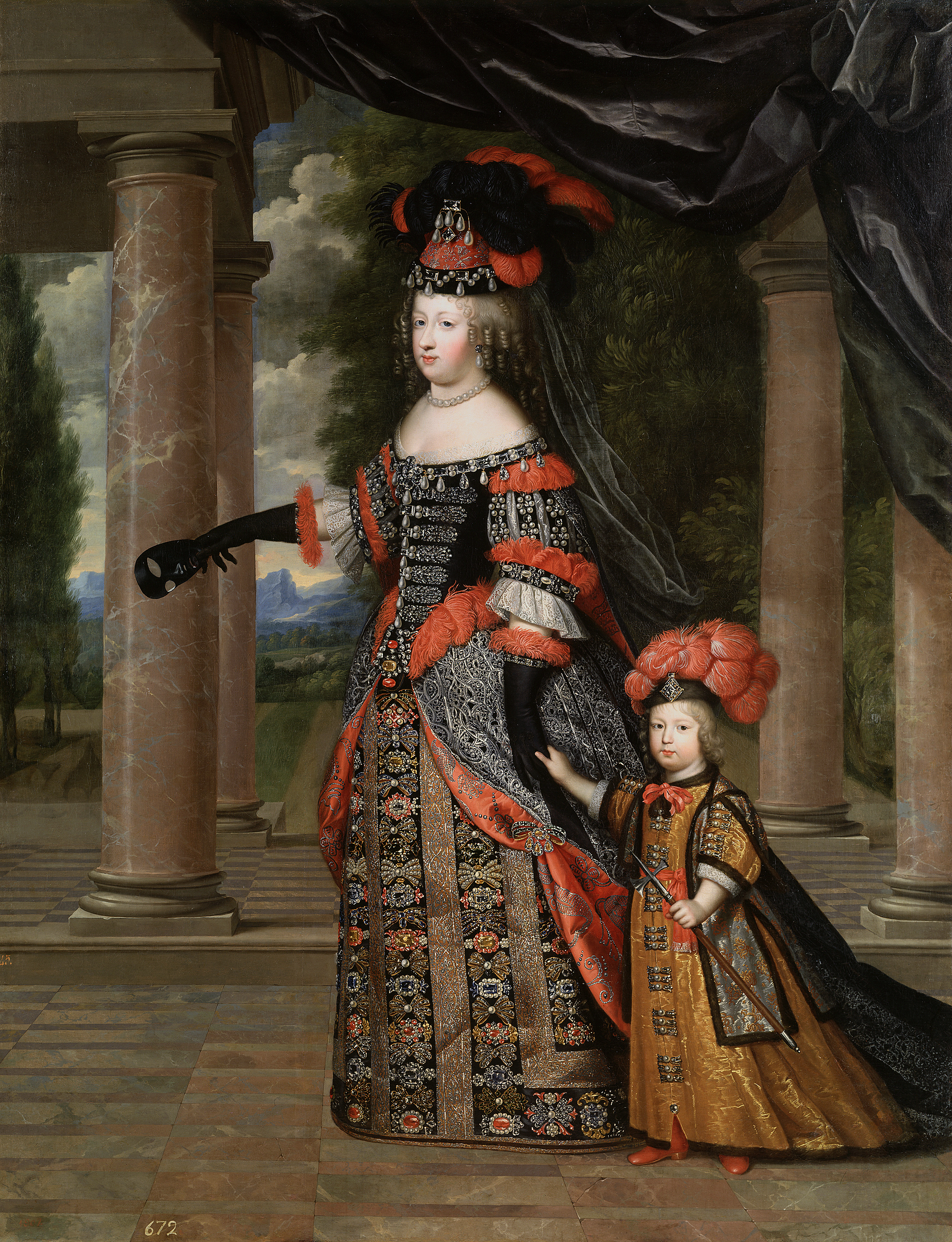
Charles Beaubrun: Maria Theresa of Austria (1638-1683) and the Grand Dauphin (1661-1711) (c. 1665), 225 × 175 cm (88.58 × 68.90 in) Oil on canvas, Prado Museum, Madrid, Spain

== Work ==
Beaubrun made many portraits of the reigning French queens, painting according to the prevailing court conventions. Thus certain similarities are evident between his portrait of Maria Theresa of Spain (Maria Theresa, Infanta of Spain), queen to Louis XIV, and an earlier portrait of Anne of Austria, queen to his father Louis XIII (both shown here) even wearing the same regal gowns.

== Sources ==
- Terminartors: Charles Beaubrun

== Sources for works ==
- Scholars Resource
- 6 artworks by or after Charles Beaubrun at the Art UK site
