= Madame Royale =

Form of address in the French monarchy

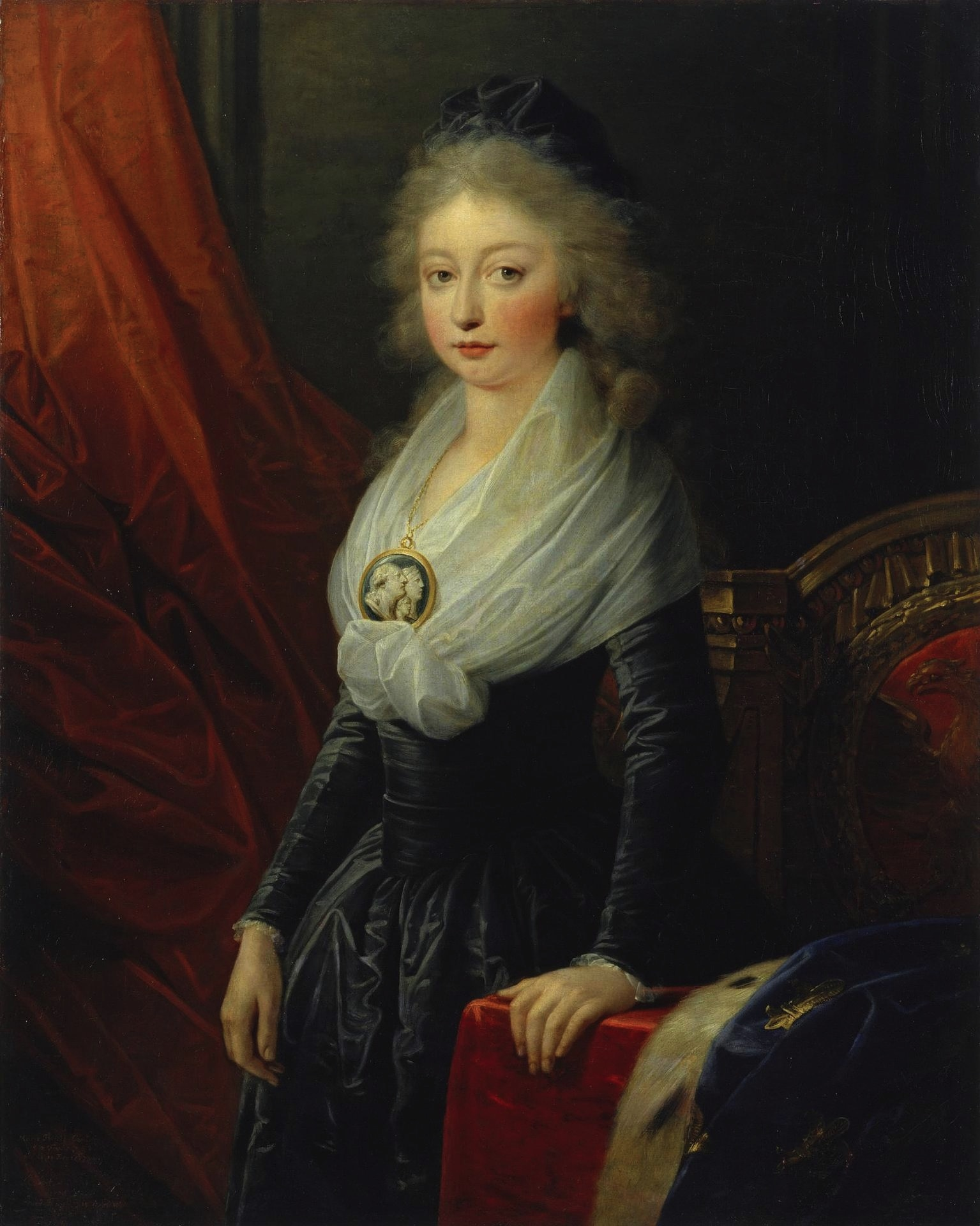
Marie-Thérèse, daughter of Louis XVI

Madame Royale (French pronunciation: [madam ʁwajal], Royal Lady) was a style customarily used for the eldest living unmarried daughter of a reigning French monarch.

It was similar to the style Monsieur, which was typically used by the King's second son. Just as Gaston, duc d'Orléans (1608–1660), the second son of King Henry IV of France (1553–1610), was known as Monsieur, Élisabeth de Bourbon (1602–1644), the eldest daughter of Henry, was known before her marriage to King Philip IV of Spain (1605–1665) as Madame Royale. After her marriage, the title was borne by her younger sister, Christine de Bourbon (1606–1663), until her marriage to Victor Amadeus I, Duke of Savoy (1587–1637), and then by their youngest sister Henrietta Maria, until her marriage to Charles I of England.

The most famous holder of this honorific was King Louis XVI's eldest daughter, Marie-Thérèse-Charlotte (1778–1851), the only one of his immediate family to survive the French Revolution. She later married her cousin, Louis-Antoine, duc d'Angoulême (1775–1844), and played a prominent role during the Bourbon Restoration.

The style Madame Royale was not regulated by any other code than that of etiquette. Its very simplicity, however, was considered more desirable than being known more formally as Son Altesse Royale ("Your Royal Highness") in conversation.

The style was customarily held until the death of the royal parent or until the princess married.

The equivalent style in Britain is Princess Royal. This title came into existence when Queen Henrietta Maria (1609–1669), another daughter of King Henry IV of France, and the wife of King Charles I of England (1600–1649), wanted to imitate in the Kingdom of England the way in which the eldest daughter of the sovereign in France was styled Madame Royale.

In Savoy, Henrietta Maria's older sister, Christine de Bourbon, became known as Madama Reale in reference to her French manner of address. Her daughter-in-law, Marie Jeanne of Savoy, when she became regent of Savoy after the early death of her husband, called herself Madama Reale, after her mother-in-law, who had also been a regent of Savoy. This was despite the fact that Marie Jeanne's father was not a king.

== See also ==
- Dauphin of France
- Fils de France
- Madame
- Monsieur
- Petit-Fils de France
- Prince du sang
