= Elisabeth of France, Queen of Spain =

Queen of Spain (1621–1644) and Portugal (1621–1640)

Elisabeth of France
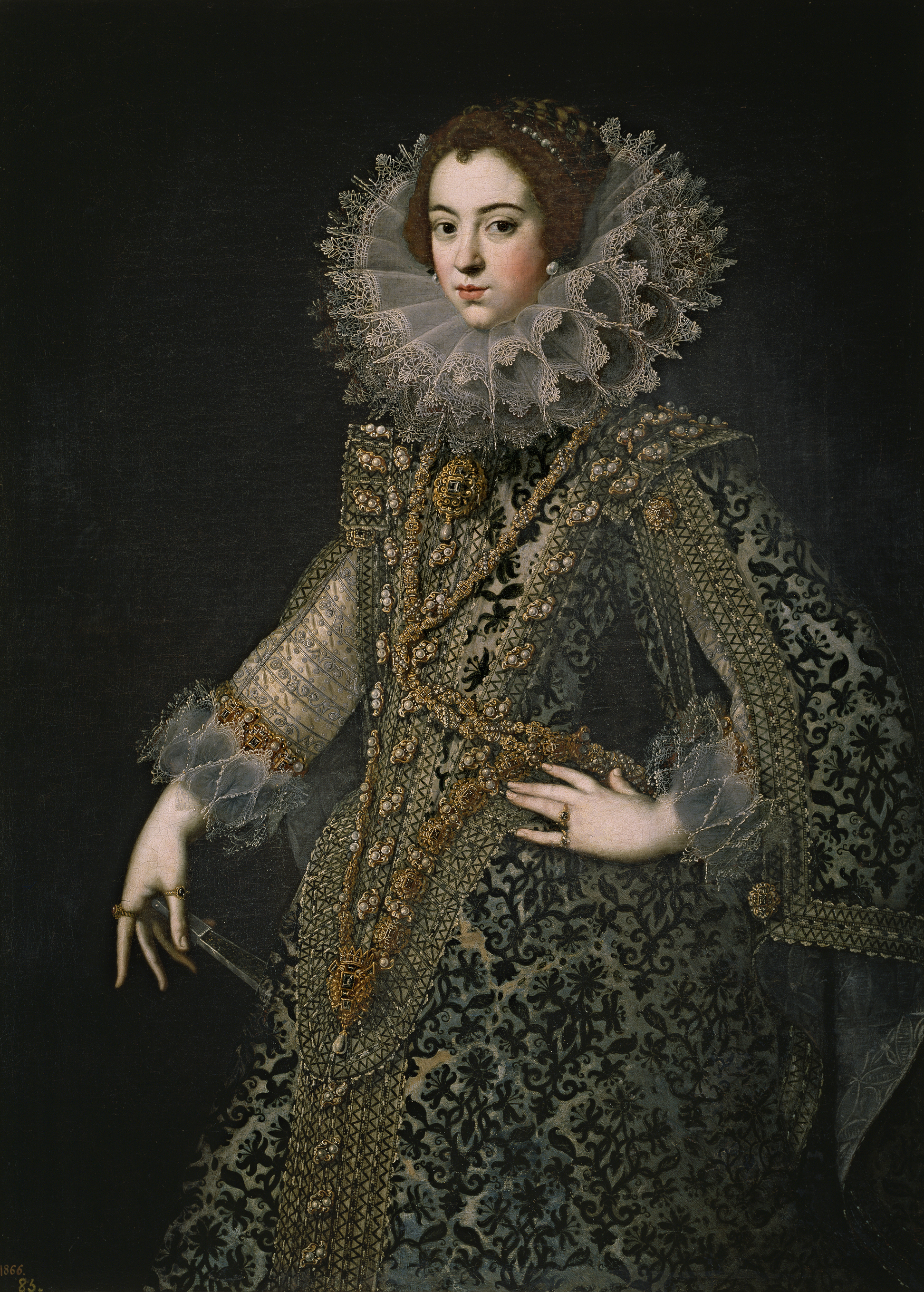
- Portrait by Rodrigo de Villandrando, c. 1620

Queen consort of Spain
- Tenure: 31 March 1621 – 6 October 1644

Queen consort of Portugal
- Tenure: 31 March 1621 – 1 December 1640
- Born: 22 November 1602; Palace of Fontainebleau, Kingdom of France
- Died: 6 October 1644 (aged 41); Royal Alcazar of Madrid, Madrid, Crown of Castile, Spain
- Burial: El Escorial
- Spouse: Philip IV of Spain (m. 1615)
- Issue more...: Balthasar Charles, Prince of Asturias; Maria Theresa, Queen of France
- House: Bourbon
- Father: Henry IV of France
- Mother: Marie de' Medici

Elisabeth of France, also known as Isabel or Elisabeth of Bourbon (22 November 1602 – 6 October 1644) was Queen of Spain from 1621 to her death and Queen of Portugal from 1621 to 1640, as the first spouse of King Philip IV & III. She served as regent of Spain during the Catalan Revolt in 1640–42 and 1643–44. As the mother of the Queen of France Maria Theresa, wife of Louis XIV, she was the great-grandmother of the Duke of Anjou, who became king of Spain as Philip V. Through her daughter, Elisabeth is the progenitor of the Spanish branch of the House of Bourbon, which still rules over Spain to this day, as all future kings of Spain after the War of Spanish Succession descend from her.

== Life ==
=== Childhood ===
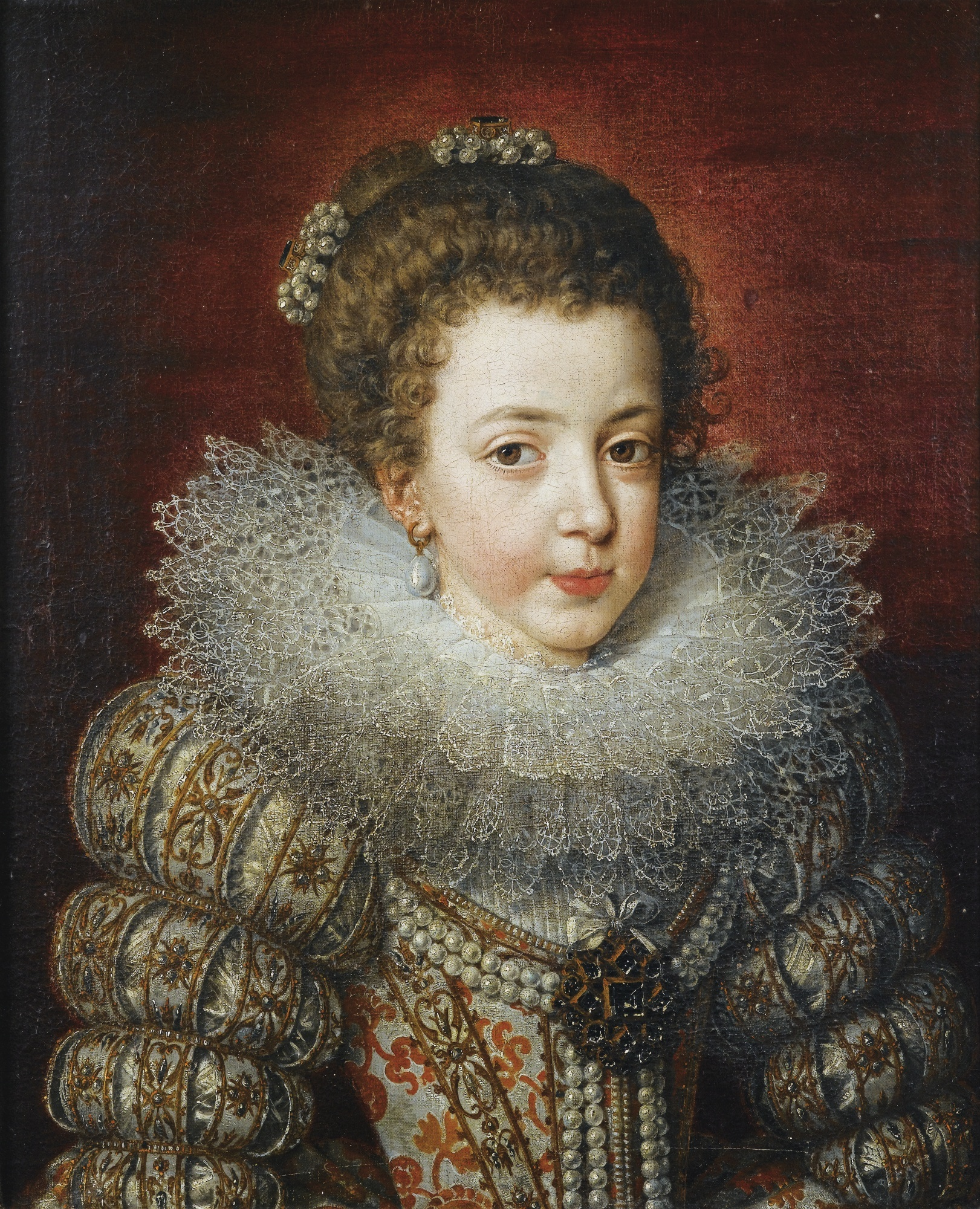
Portrait of Elisabeth as a girl by Frans Pourbus the Younger

Elisabeth was born at Château de Fontainebleau on 22 November 1602, the eldest daughter of King Henry IV of France and his second wife, Marie de' Medici. According to the court, her mother showed a cruel indifference to her, because she had believed the prophecy of a nun who assured her that she would give birth to three consecutive sons.

Shortly after her birth, she was betrothed to Philip Emmanuel, Prince of Piedmont, son and heir of Charles Emmanuel I, Duke of Savoy, by Catherine Michaela, daughter of King Philip II of Spain. However, Philip Emmanuel died of smallpox in 1605.

As a daughter of the King of France, she was born a Fille de France. As the eldest daughter of the king, she was known at court by the traditional honorific of Madame Royale. The early years of Madame Royale were spent under the supervision of the royal governess Françoise de Montglat at the Château de Saint-Germain-en-Laye, a quiet place away from the Parisian court, in which she shared education and games with her legitimate siblings, as well as illegitimate half-siblings; children who were the result of her father's constant love affairs. Besides the Dauphin Louis, the other Enfants de France (Henry IV's legitimate children) were Christine Marie, later Duchess of Savoy; Nicholas Henri, Duke of Orléans, who died in infancy; Gaston, Duke of Orléans; and Henrietta Maria, later Queen of England. When King Henry IV was assassinated outside the Palais du Louvre in Paris on 14 May 1610, her brother the Dauphin (with whom Elisabeth had a very close relationship) succeeded him to the throne as King Louis XIII under the regency of their mother Marie de' Medici.

In 1612, when Elisabeth was ten years old, negotiations were begun for a double marriage between the royal families of France and Spain; Elisabeth would marry the Prince of Asturias (the future Philip IV of Spain) and her brother Louis, the Spanish Infanta Anne.

=== Marriage ===
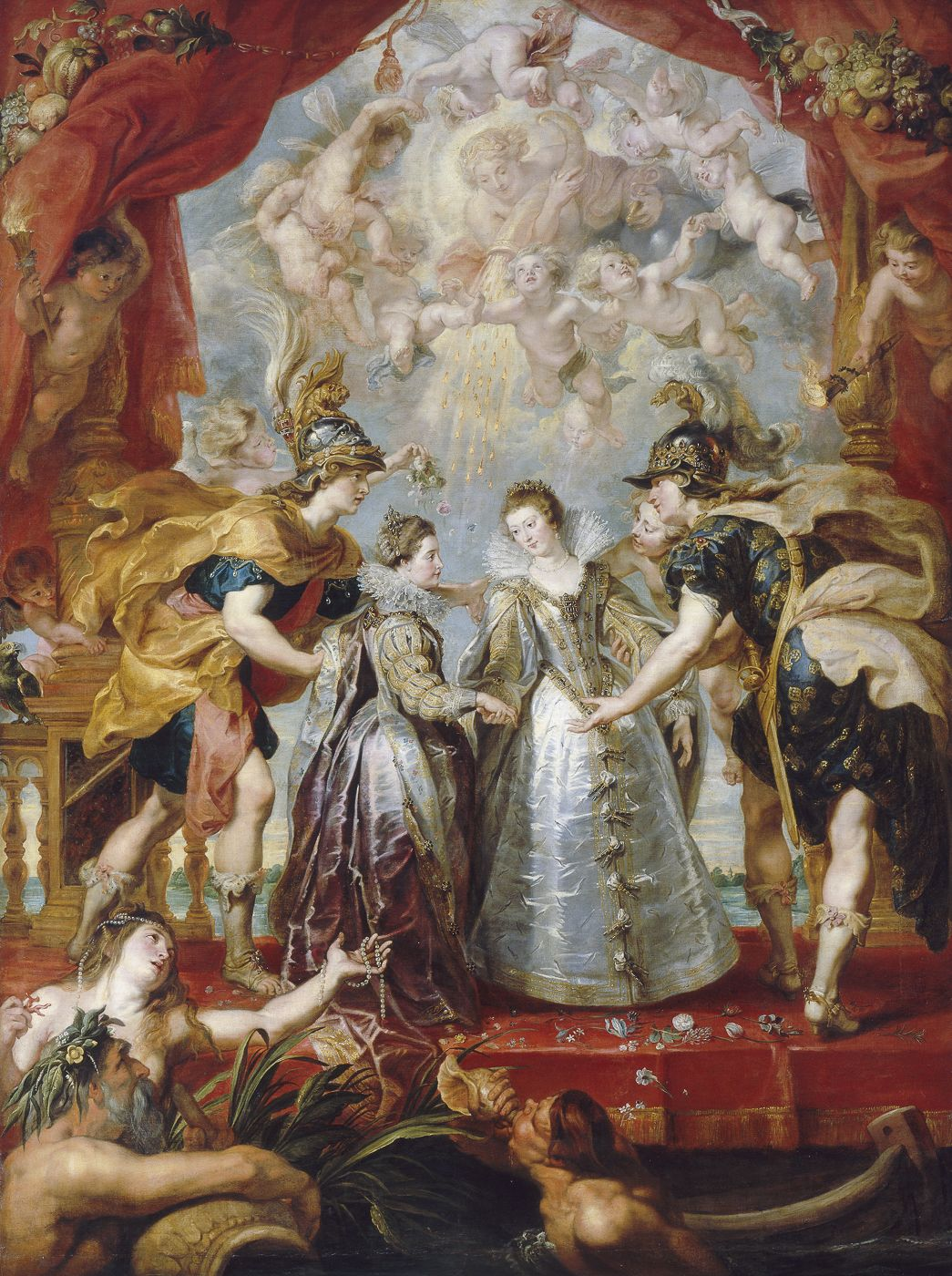
Peter Paul Rubens’ Exchange of the Princesses, c. 1623

After her proxy marriage to the Prince of Asturias and Louis's proxy marriage to the Infanta Anne, Elisabeth and her brother met their respective spouses for the first time on 25 November 1615 on Pheasant Island, a small island in the River Bidassoa that divides France and Spain between the French city of Hendaye and the Spanish city of Fuenterrabía. This was the last time Louis would see his sister. In Spain, Elisabeth's French name took on the Spanish form of Isabel. The religious ceremony took place in the Cathedral of Saint Mary of Burgos. At the time of her marriage, the thirteen-year-old Isabel became the new Princess of Asturias.

This marriage followed a tradition of cementing military and political alliances between the Catholic powers of France and Spain with royal marriages. The tradition went back to 1559 with the marriage of King Philip II of Spain with the French princess Elisabeth of Valois, the daughter of King Henry II of France, as part of the Peace of Cateau-Cambrésis. The Exchange of the Princesses at the Spanish Border was painted by Peter Paul Rubens as part of his Marie de' Medici cycle.

=== Queen ===
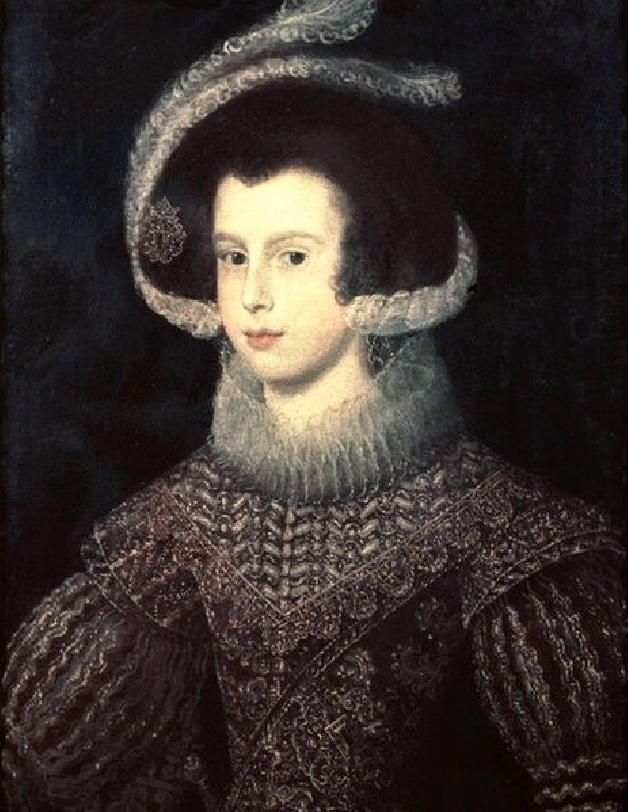
Elisabeth of France by Diego Velazquez, 1625

Coat of arms of Elisabeth of France as queen consort of Spain

Elisabeth was renowned for her beauty, intelligence and noble personality, which made her very popular in Spain. In 1621, the couple had ascended to the throne of Spain upon the death of Philip III of Spain. The new queen of Spain was aware that her husband had mistresses.

Elisabeth herself was the subject of rumors about her relations with the noted poet Peralta (Juan de Tassis, 2nd Count of Villamediana), who was her gentleman-in-waiting. On 14 May 1622, a fire broke out while the Peralta masque La Gloria de Niquea was being acted before the court. Peralta carried the queen to a place of safety, which caused suspicion about their relationship to deepen. Peralta neglected a significant warning that his life was in peril, and "he was murdered as he stepped out of his coach. The responsibility for his death was divided between Philip IV and Olivares" (at the time, prime minister and king's favorite).

She was regent of Spain during the Catalan Revolt and supported the Duke of Nochera against the Count-Duke of Olivares in favor of an honorable withdrawal from the Catalan Revolt.

Prior to 1640, the queen does not appear to have had much influence over state affairs, which was largely entrusted to Olivares. Elisabeth did not get along with Olivares, who reportedly assisted Philip IV in his adultery, and prevented her from achieving any political influence and once famously remarked, when she presented a political view to the king, that priests existed to pray as well as queens existed to give birth.

Between 1640 and 1642, Elisabeth served as regent for the king in his absence during the Catalan revolt and was given very good marks for her efforts. She was reputed to have influenced the fall of Olivares as a part of a "women's conspiracy" alongside the duchess of Mantua, Ana de Guevara, María de Ágreda and her chief lady-in-waiting Luisa Manrique de Lara, Countess Paredes de Nava.

The fall of Olivares made the king consider her his only political partner, and when the king left again for the front in 1643, Elisabeth was again appointed regent assisted by Juan Chumacero Carrillo y Sotomayor. Her second regency was also well received, and she was credited by the king for her efforts to provide vital supplies for the troops as well as for her negotiations with the banks to provide finances for the army, offering her own jewelry as security. It was rumored that she was intending to follow the example of Queen Isabella the Catholic and lead her own army to retake Badajoz.

The Queen died from complications of Erysipelas in Madrid on 6 October 1644 at the age of forty-one, leaving two children: Balthasar Charles and Maria Theresa. Upon her death her husband wrote in a letter to Sister María of Àgreda, his spiritual advisor, "I lost in only one person everything that you can lose in this life " After her death, her husband married his niece Mariana of Austria. Elisabeth's last child, Infanta Maria Theresa of Spain, would later become queen of France as the wife of her nephew, the future Louis XIV. Unlike her husband and sister-in-law, she would not see the wedding that cemented the peace between her homeland and adopted country, Spain; the countries would be at war until 1659.

== Issue ==
- Maria Margaret of Austria, Infanta of Spain (14 August 1621 – 15 August 1621), died in infancy
- Margaret Maria Catherine of Austria, Infanta of Spain (25 November 1623 – 22 December 1623), died in infancy
- Maria Eugenia of Austria, Infanta of Spain (21 November 1625 – 21 August 1627), died in infancy
- Isabella Maria Theresa of Austria, Infanta of Spain (31 October 1627 – 1 November 1627), died in infancy
- Balthasar Charles of Austria, Infante of Spain (17 October 1629 - 9 October 1646), Prince of Asturias.
- Francis Ferdinand of Austria, Infante of Spain (12 March 1634 – 12 December 1634), died in infancy
- Maria Anna Antonia Dominica Jacinta of Austria, Infanta of Spain (17 January 1635 – 5 December 1636), died in infancy
- Maria Theresa of Austria, Infanta of Spain (10 September 1638 – 30 July 1683), married Louis XIV of France and had issue.

Elisabeth also suffered at least three miscarriages:

- A miscarried daughter (16 November 1626)
- A miscarried daughter (1640)
- A miscarried son (1644)

== Ancestors ==
Ancestors of Elisabeth of France

8. Charles, Duke of Vendôme
4. Antoine, Duke of Vendôme
9. Françoise of Alençon
2. Henri IV, King of France
10. Henri II, King of Navarre
5. Joan III of Navarre
11. Marguerite of Angoulême
1. Elisabeth of France
12. Cosimo I de' Medici, Grand Duke of Tuscany
6. Francesco I de' Medici, Grand Duke of Tuscany
13. Leonor of Toledo
3. Marie de' Medici
14. Ferdinand I, Holy Roman Emperor
7. Johanna of Austria
15. Anna of Bohemia and Hungary

== Gallery ==
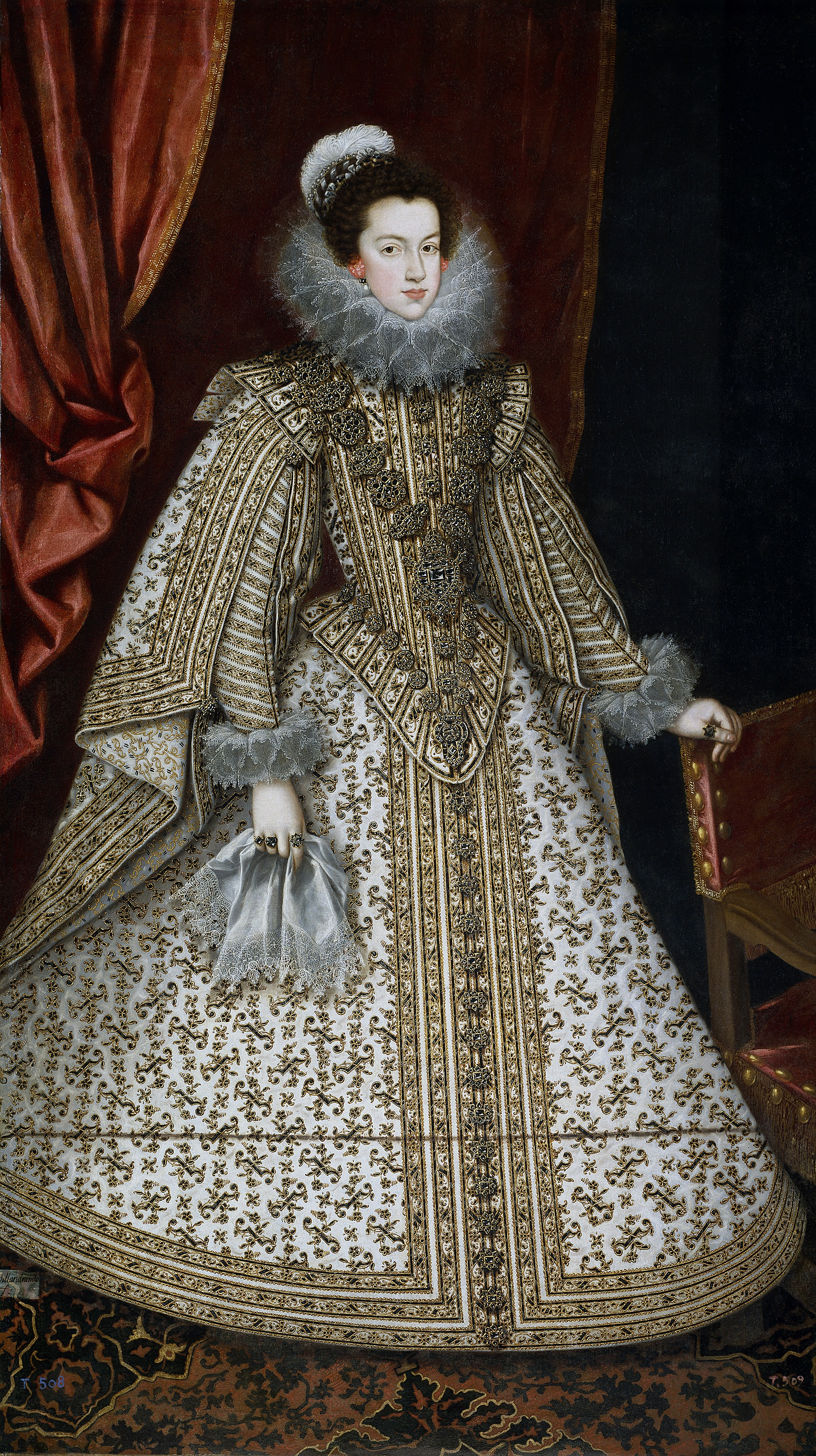
Elisabeth portrayed by Rodrigo de Villandrando

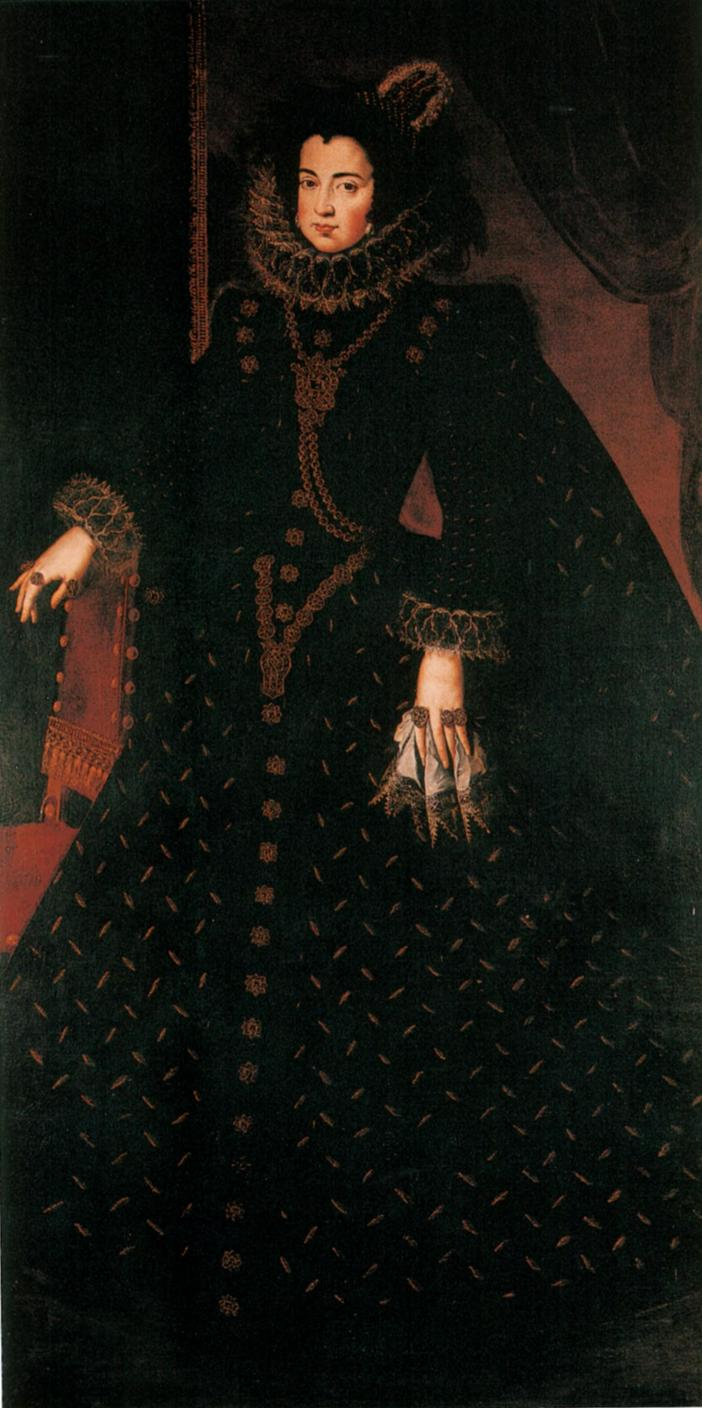
Elisabeth portrayed by Velázquez

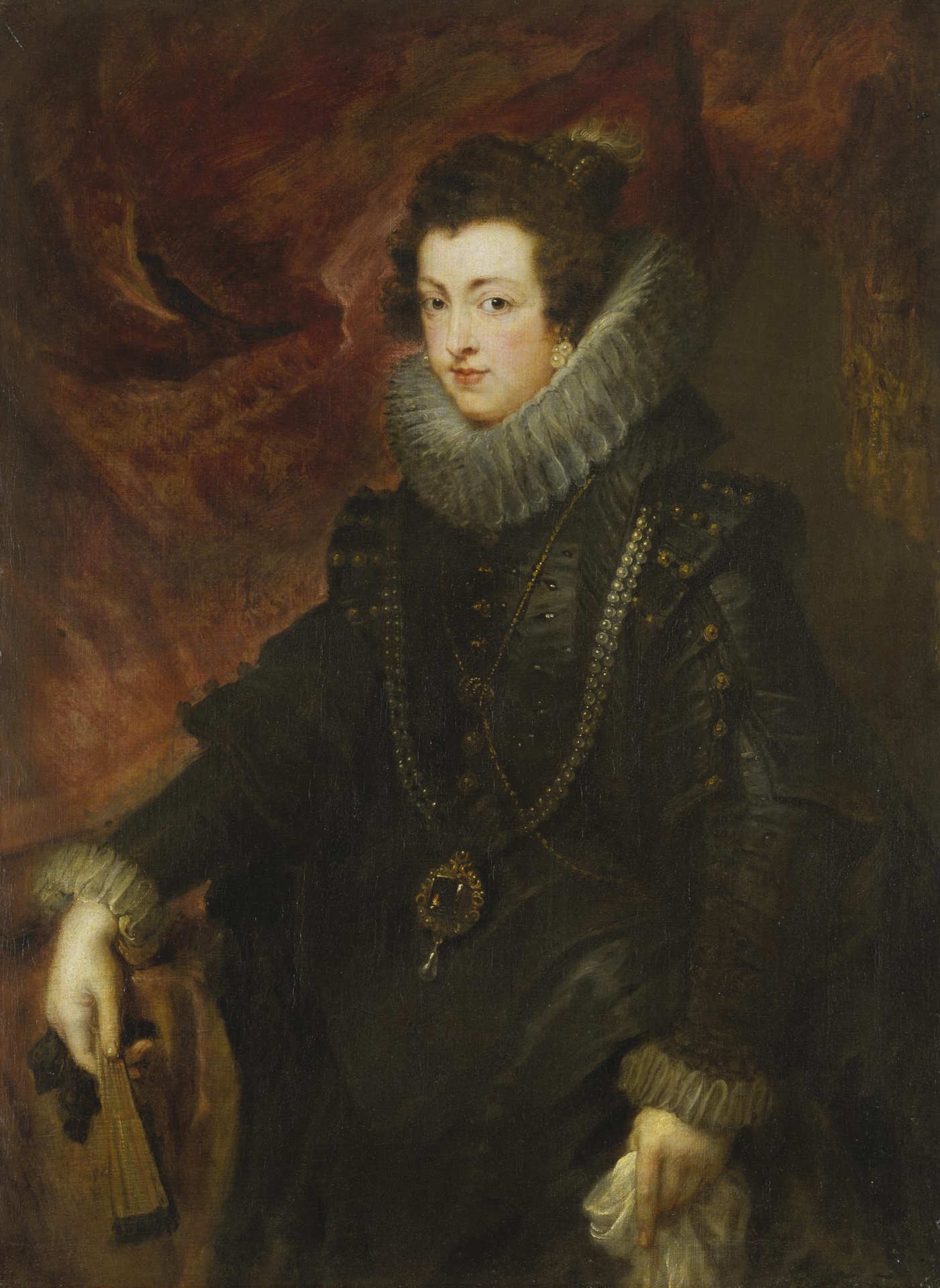
As portrayed by Rubens, 1620

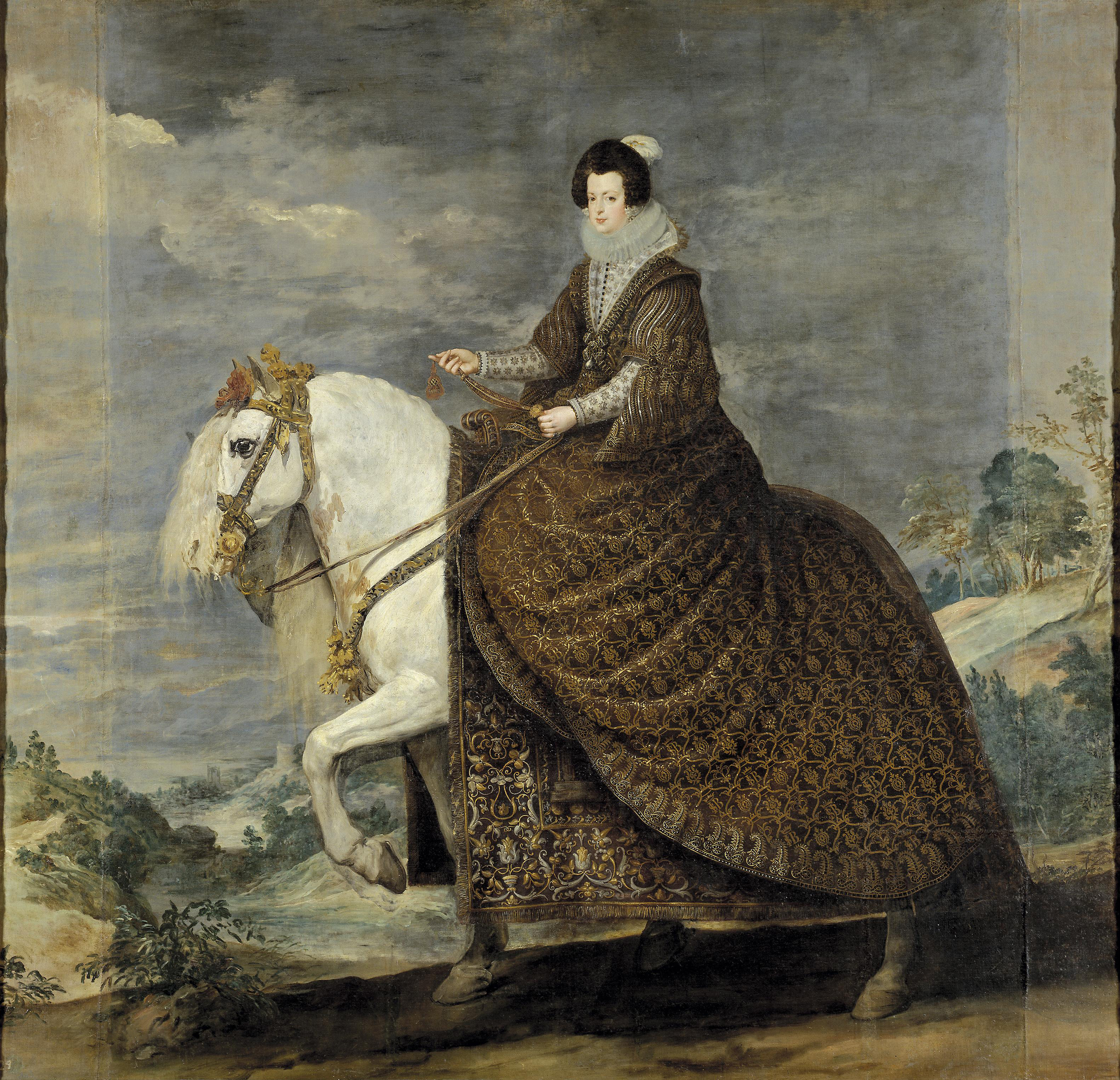
An equestrian portrait of Elisabeth by Velázquez, 1632

Elisabeth of France, Queen of Spain House of Bourbon Cadet branch of the Capetian dynasty Born: 22 November 1602 Died: 6 October 1644
Spanish royalty
| Vacant Title last held by Margaret of Austria | Queen consort of Portugal; 1621–1640 | Vacant Title next held by Luisa de Guzmán |
| Vacant Title last held by Margaret of Austria | Queen consort of Spain; 1621–1644 | Vacant Title next held by Mariana of Austria |
