= Château d'Harcourt (Thury-Harcourt) =

Former château of the dukes of Harcourt in Normandy, France

Coordinates: 48°59′15″N 0°28′50″W

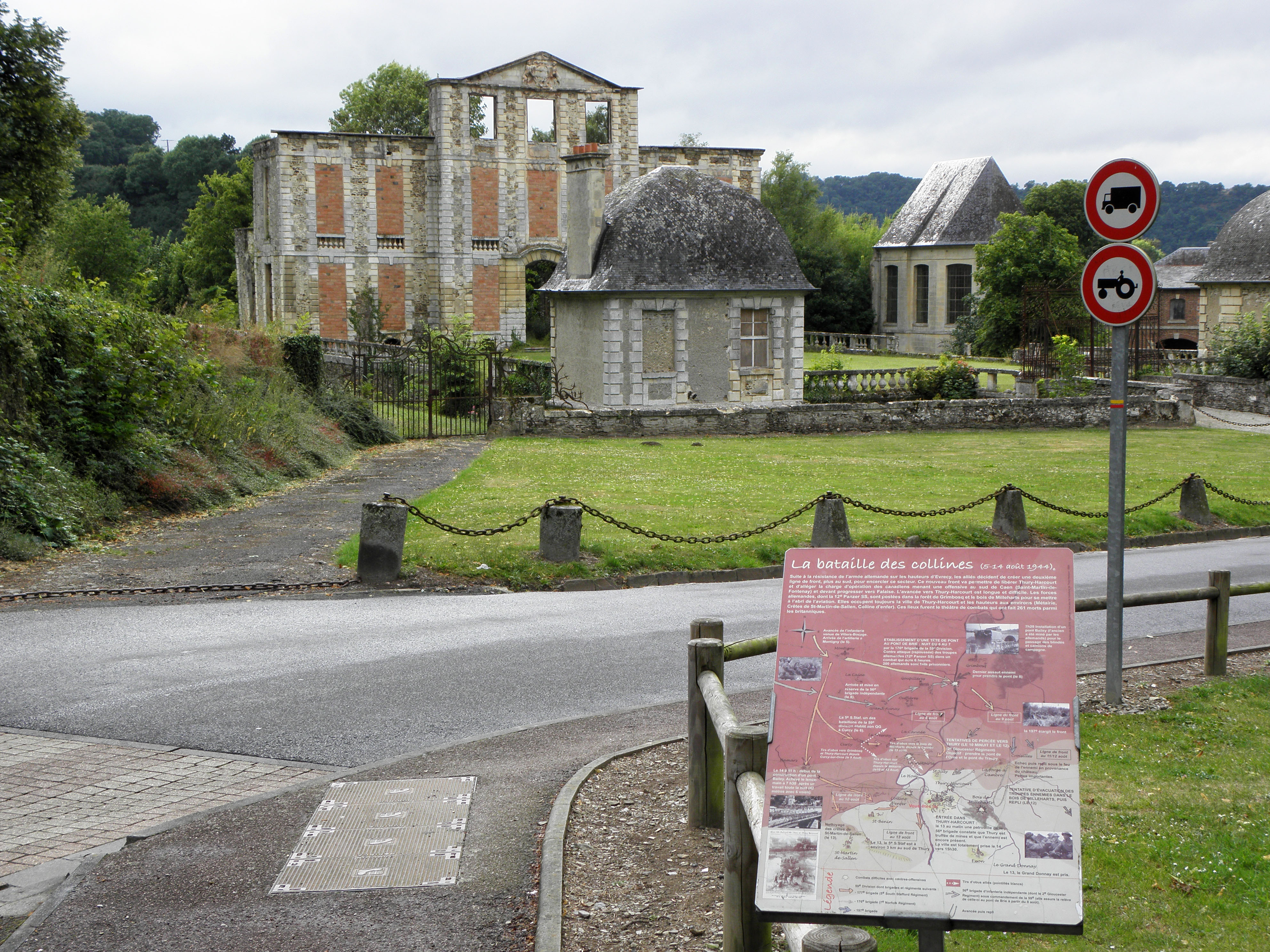
Château de Thury-Harcourt today

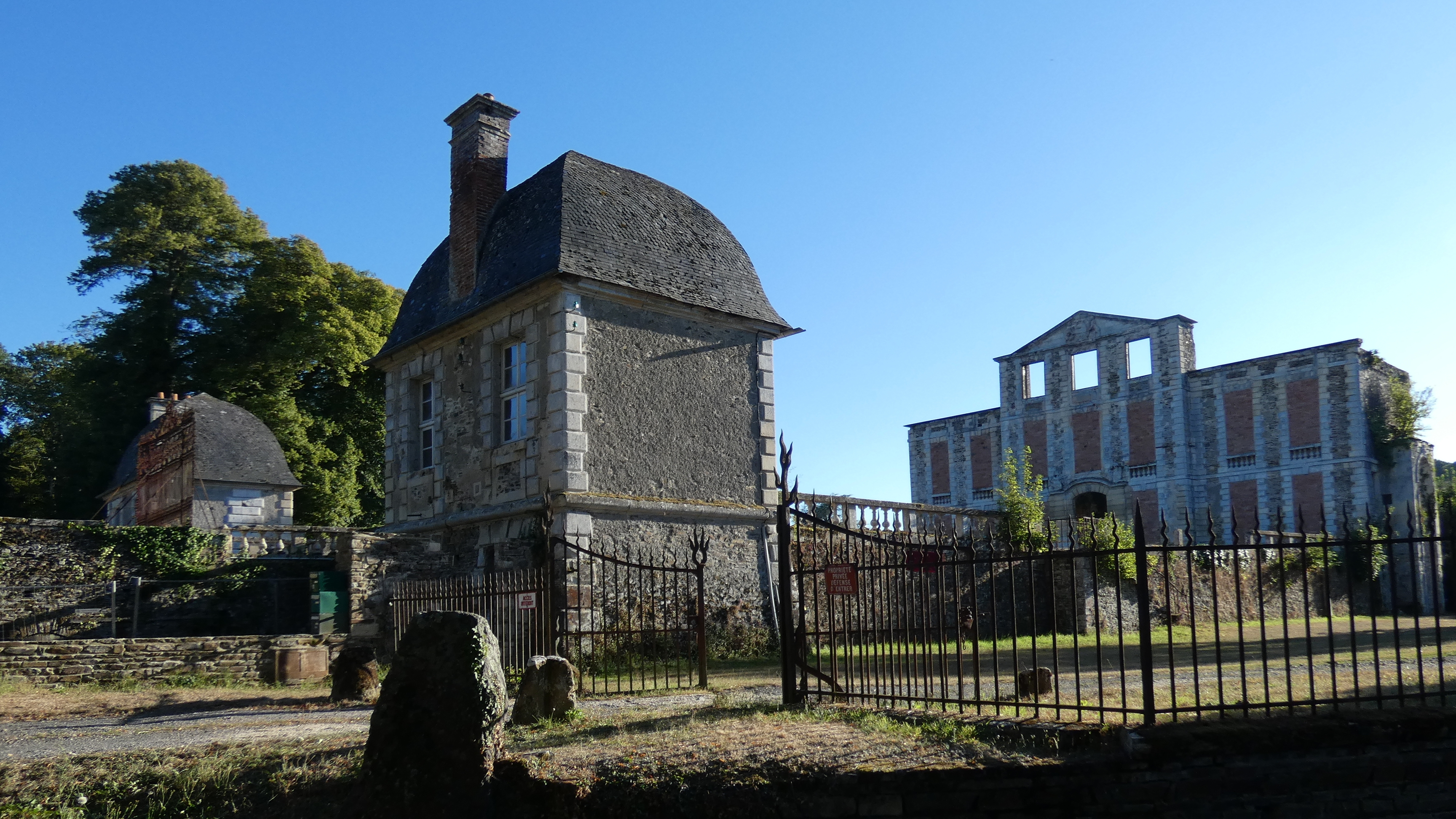
The ruins of the main façade

The Château d'Harcourt is a stately home dating from the 17th and 18th century, now in ruins, located in the village of Thury-Harcourt, in the Calvados department in the Normandy region in northwestern France. It was the seat of the dukes of Harcourt and the Hartcourt family. Since World War II, only the façades, two guard pavilions and a chapel remain. The ruins are listed as a historic monument.

The château was known as the Versailles of Normandy. In addition, the gardens were one of the first in the English landscape style in France, and were well-known and admired.

== Location ==
The ruins of the château are situated on the bank of the Orne, which traverses its park, 350 meters northwest of the Saint-Sauveur church in the village of Thury-Harcourt.

== History ==
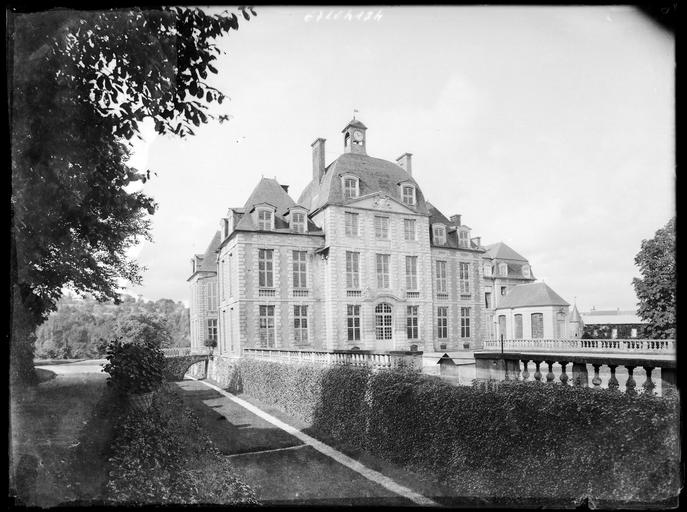
The main façade created in the 17th century

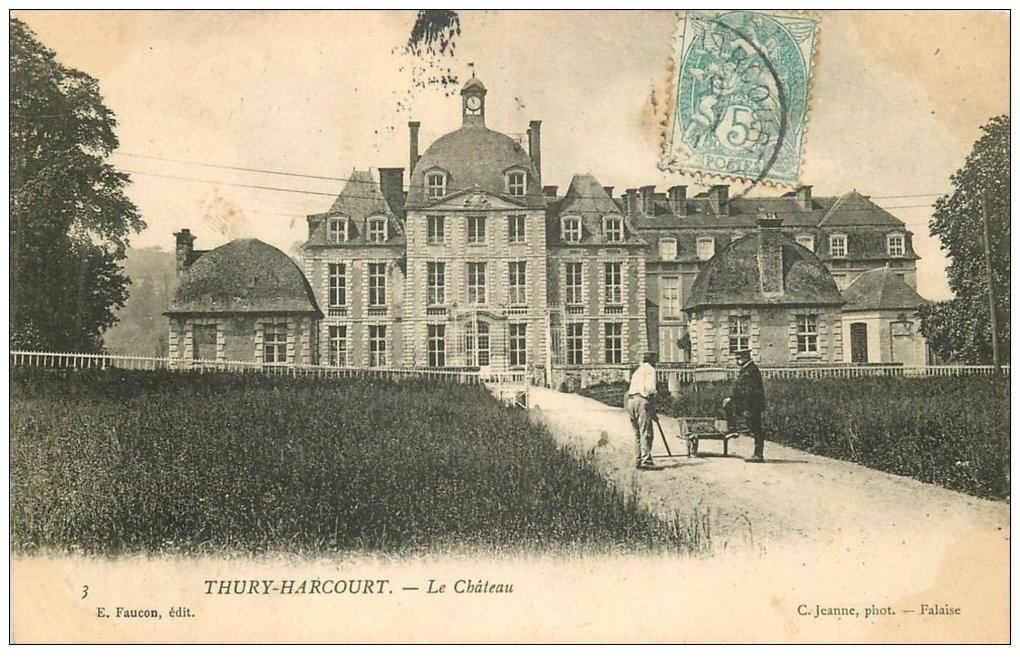
The Château in 1907

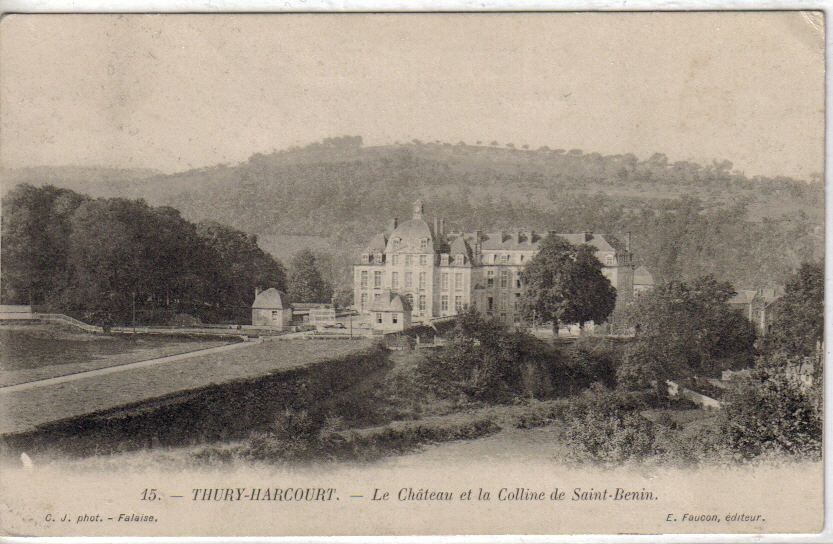
The Château with the Saint-Benin Hill in the back, where the fifth duke created his English landscape garden

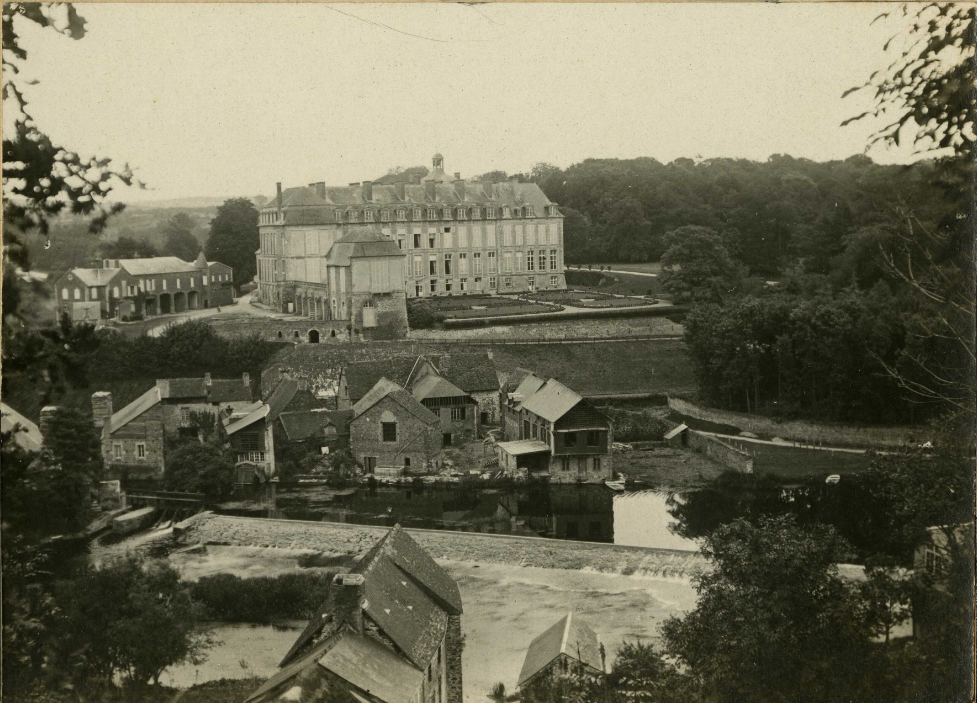
The Château overlooking the Orne river

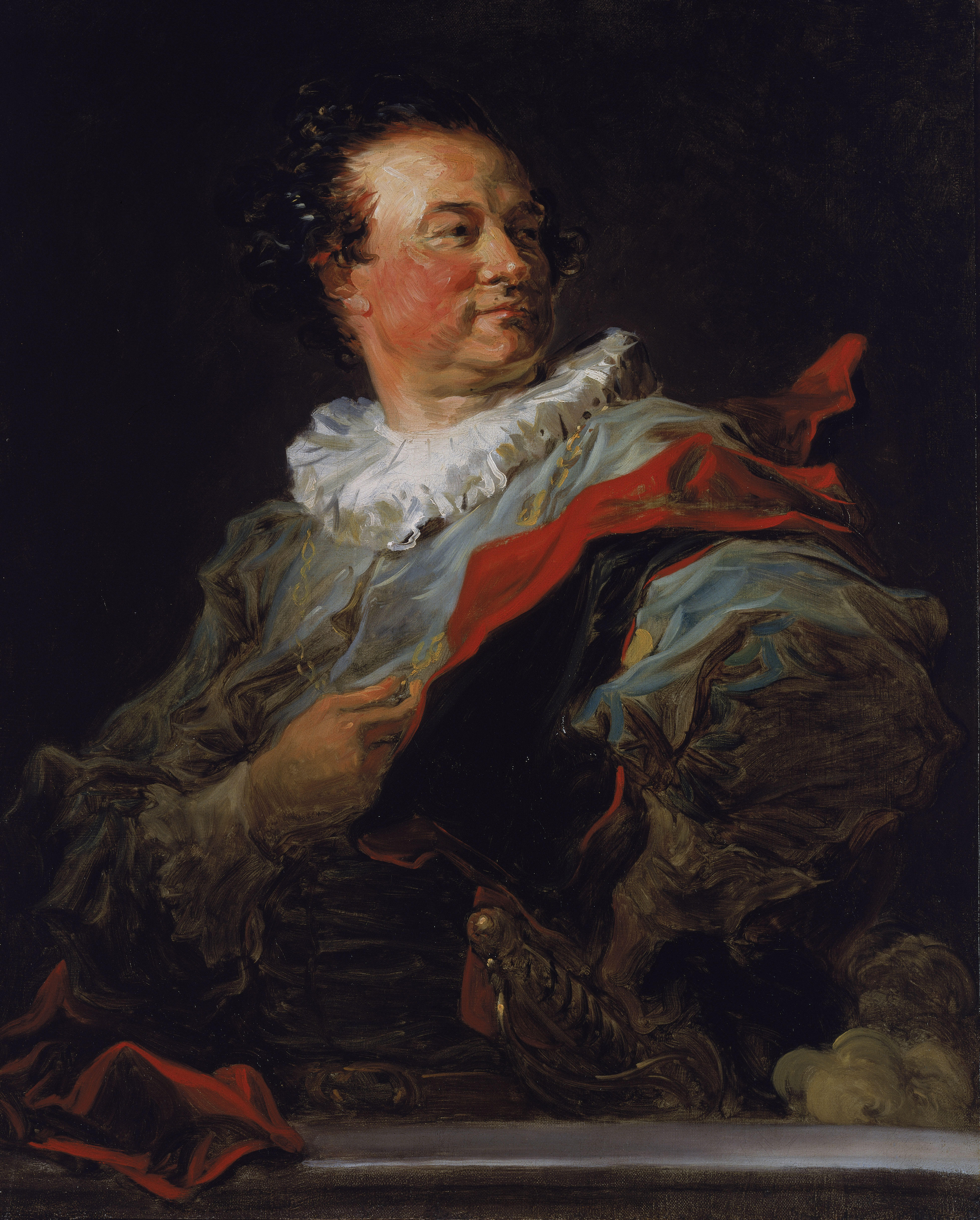
The 5th duke of Harcourt by Jean-Honoré Fragonard (around 1769)

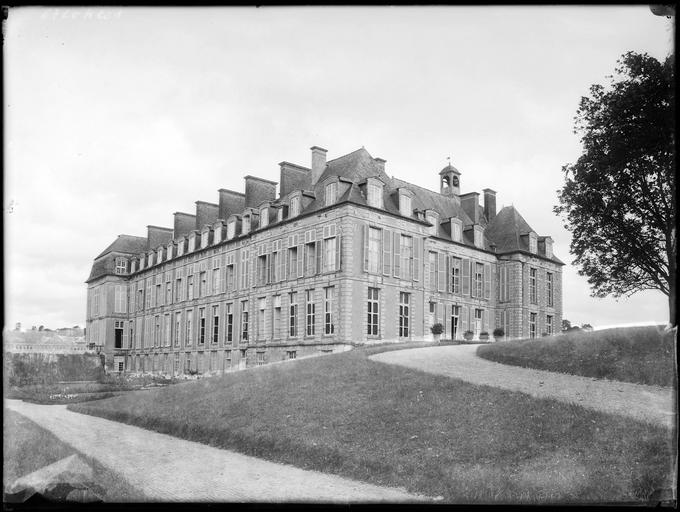
The wing created by the first duke of Harcourt

=== Middle Ages: Barony of Thury ===
Since the Middle Ages, Thury had a castle, likely dating back to the 11th century when the Norman baron Raoul II Tesson du Cinglas was Lord of Thury. In 1046, he becomes involved in a plot to assassinate the young Duke of Normandy, the future William the Conqueror, before switching allegiances.

The Tesson family is succeeded by the Crespin family, when Jeanne Tesson married Jean Crespin. Their granddaughter, Blanche Crespin inherits the barony and marries Pierre de Préaux. Around 1367, their daughter marries Jacques de Bourbon-Préaux, who is the ‘grand bouteiller de France’, which is one of the Great Officers of the Crown of France. As they have no children, the barony of Thury returns to the Préaux family. They are again succeeded by the Ferrières and Amount families.

=== 16th century: Montmorency family ===
In 1522, the Montmorency family becomes owner when Anne d’Aumont married Claude de Montmorency, lord of Fosseux. The barony is elevated to a marquisate for their son, Pierre I, in 1578. Succession continues through Pierre I's son, Anne, who passes in 1592, followed by his grandson, Pierre II, who passes in 1615, and great-grandson, François (1614–1686).

=== 17th century: Harcourt family comes to Thury ===
In the 17th century, the Hartcourt family enters the history of Thury, when in 1635, Odet d'Harcourt acquires the marquisate of Thury. He decides to construct a new château in Thury. This is the oldest part of the building and forms the main façade to the courtyard.

=== 1st Duke of Harcourt: Creation of the Norman Versailles ===
Odet's grandson, Henri d’Harcourt sells Thury to another Henri d’Harcourt (1654–1718), then marques of Beuvron. He was a successful military commander, who was appointed extraordinary ambassador to Spain in 1697. It were turbulent times as king Charles II of Spain (1661–1700) had no children and died without a direct heir. It is unknown which role Harcourt played in the intrigues following Charles's death, but it resulted in a French Bourbon on the throne: Philip V. When he returned to France, the grateful king Louis XIV created him the first duke of Harcourt in 1700 and Marshal of France in 1703.

The first duke undertook the expansion of the château by adding a long wing overlooking the Orne river. The wing was covered by a mansard roof. Also, a chapel was added on the courtyard side of this wing. Interrupted by the death of the duke, the works were completed by his widows, Marie Anne Claude Brulart de Genlis, who installed her apartments at the north end of this new wing.

=== 18th century: 5th Duke of Harcourt and the creation of an English landscape garden ===
During the 18th century, the château remains with the dukes of Harcourt, who are often also the governors of Normandy.

François-Henri d'Harcourt (1726–1802), the 5th duke of Harcourt, served in the King's army, distinguished himself in the and in the end, he is promoted to lieutenant-general in 1762. Also, he works in the administration of Normandy and ultimately inherits his father's office in 1776, governor of Normandy. But the ultimate achievement was being appointed in 1786 as governor of the Dauphin of France, Louis-Joseph. His great passion were gardens, on which he wrote a book advocating the English landscape-style. But he not only wrote about it, he also put into practice. On the other side of the valley, opposite of the château, he created a vast English landscape-style park, a testing ground and laboratory for his garden theories and ideas.

On the night of 21 June 22 June 1786, king Louis XVI and his entourage stayed at château in Thury-Harcourt during their journey to Cherbourg. Coming from Falaise, they were received by the duke and duchess of Harcourt, dined there, and then resumed their journey in the morning to Caen.

During the French Revolution, François Henri d'Harcourt emigrated to England. His estates including the château were confiscated. In England, he served king Louis XVIII as ambassador-in-exile and died in the village of Staines-upon-Thames, north of London. His grandchildren managed to regain possession of the domain in the early 19th century. As the fifth duke had no sons, it were his grandchildren through his daughter, who was married to duke of Mortemart.

=== 19th century: Return of the dukes of Harcourt ===
Upon the death of the daughter of the Duchess of Mortemart, the Princess of Beauvau, in 1854, her children sold the château and the family treasures it contained in 1856 to their cousin, Eugène d'Harcourt (1786–1865), the 8th duke of Harcourt. So, the château returned to the Harcourt family, and the 8th duke's descendants have retained it since.

=== World War II ===
At the beginning of 1940, about fifty objects from the château, already classified as historical monuments, furniture, artworks, and family souvenirs, were transferred to the Château de Carrouges as a precaution.

On 12 August 1944, the British 59th (Staffordshire) Infantry Division reached the outskirts of Thury-Harcourt. At the same moment, soldiers from the retreating 2nd SS Panzer Division Das Reich set the château and the village afire to leave a smoke screen behind. The castle and its treasures vanished amidst the inferno, along with over 150 paintings and a library containing over 15,000 books. Also, a significant part of the archive of the Harcourt family was lost.

=== Today ===
The Harcourt family decided not to reconstruct the château, except for the chapel. Besides this, only the ruins of the main façade (17th century) remain including the courtyard, accessed by a drawbridge flanked by two guard pavilions, overlooking dry moats.

== Architecture ==
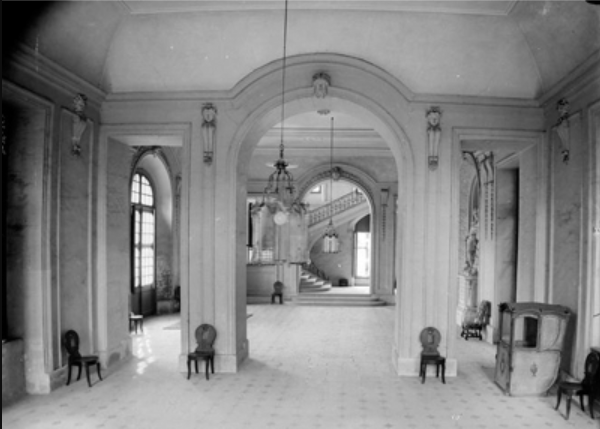
The vestibule

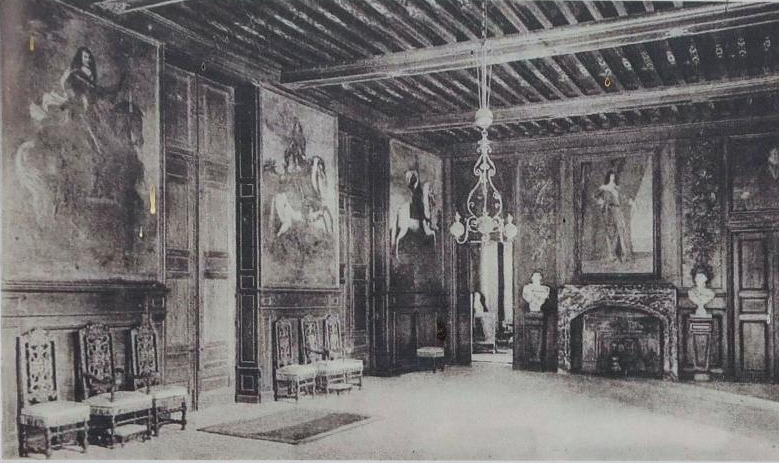
The Marshal's hall

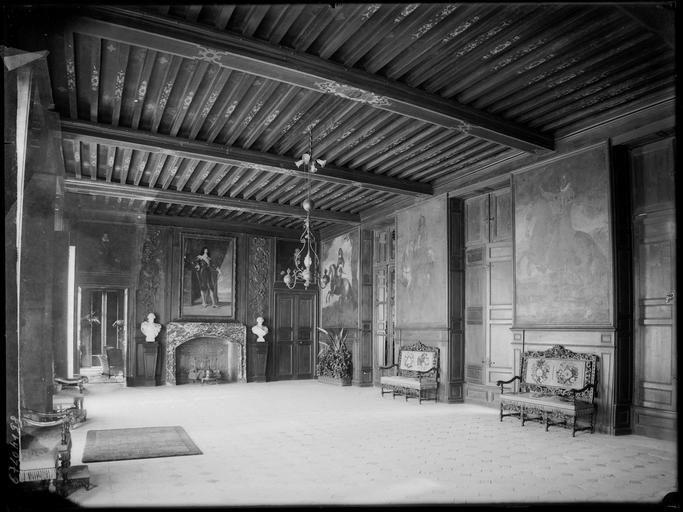
Another view of the Marshal's hall

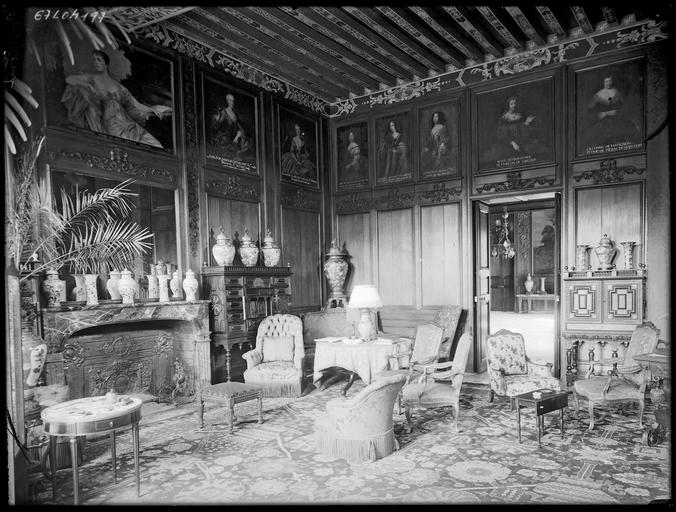
The room known as the 'Ladies of Harcourt'

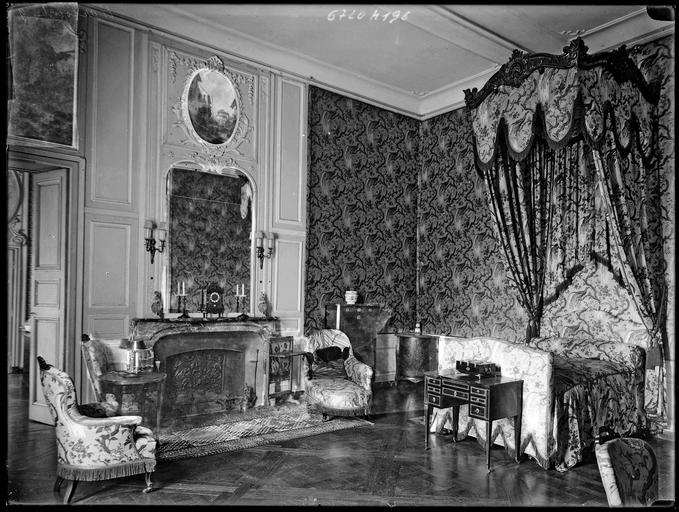
bedroom

=== Interior (before 1944) ===
Inside the château, there were the following rooms and halls:

- The vast entrance vestibule with its sculpted décor and marble flooring. In the 18th century, the dining room was on its north side. On its south side, it was occupied by the main staircase, made of stone with a Louis XIV style wrought iron railing. Facing the entrance door, a niche contained a statue of King Louis XIV.
- The Marshal's Hall, in the south wing, a long and spacious room panelled with natural wood, adorned with large equestrian portraits of various Marshals of France from the Harcourt lineage.
- The salon known as the "Ladies of Harcourt," also adorned with natural wood panelling, with a series of portraits representing different women of the Harcourt family under the French ceiling cornice.
- A boudoir adorned with white lacquered wood panelling, displaying, among other things, two portraits by Fragonard of the 5th Duke of Harcourt and his brother, the Duke of Beuvron.
- The Governors' Salon, adorned with natural wood Louis XIV style panelling, displaying portraits of several prominent figures from the Harcourt lineage.
- The dining room, adorned with paintings above the doorways depicting the estate from various perspectives in the 18th century.
- The red salon, adorned with several family portraits.
- The staircase leading to the first floor, decorated with eight large paintings depicting the story of Joseph, painted under Louis XIV.
- The room where King Louis XVI spent the night on his way to Cherbourg in 1786, furnished with Jouy fabric adorned with island birds.
- The boudoir adorned with white lacquered wood panelling, displaying eight arched-shaped paintings depicting scenes from the 18th century. Each of these eight paintings was topped by a medallion painting depicting a bouquet of flowers. These eight arched-shaped paintings survived the 1944 fire and were exhibited in the 1970s at the Château du Champ de Bataille.

== Park ==
François-Henri d'Harcourt, 5th Duke of Harcourt, was passionate about gardens. In 1774, he published Traité de la décoration des dehors, des jardins et des parcs, a book advocating English landscape style. He used his ancestral château in Thury-Harcourt as testing ground for his theories and ideas. The Orne river splits the valley at Thury in two. On the right bank is the château. And on an opposite hill, on the left bank, the duke created a vast landscape garden. As the park was one of the first in France, it became a must-visit destination for anyone interested in the latest garden styles.

The park rivalled in charm and fame with the garden created by René de Girardin in Ermenonville. The writer Jean Baptiste Claude Delisle de Sales dedicated a poem to it. On 23 August 1788, the British agronomist Arthur Young visited the park, which he then described as "the most beautiful English garden in France".

The garden was for the 5th duke also a means of showing his pride in the English links of the Harcourt family. His English cousin, Simon Harcourt, 1st Earl Harcourt, (1714–1777), British ambassador to the French court from 1768 to 1772 remodelled his country seat, Nuneham House, and created a large landscape garden as well, including a model village.

The duke later created another garden in his estate in Chaillot near Paris. Also, he created a garden at the château of Betz for Maria Caterina Brignole (1737–1813), Princess of Monaco by marriage to Prince Honoré III.

The hill's amenities included groves of rare trees, antique-style garden structures, and paths, all providing artistic viewpoints. This part of the park was accessible from the château by boat and by a specially built footbridge over the Orne.

From the French Revolution onwards, the park was left without maintenance. In 1831, groves of trees and a beautiful Lebanese cedar were still visible on the hill. The 18th-century park arrangements are now difficult to perceive.

Damaged by the 1944 battles, which partly destroyed the nearby town of Thury-Harcourt, the park was redesigned after the war by the 11th Duke of Harcourt. Near the fantasy pavilion, flower gardens were created on three successive terraces in the vast park descending to the Orne.
