= House of Harcourt =

Norman noble family

- Noble House
- Shield of the House of Harcourt – Gules, with two fesses or.
- Country: Duchy of Normandy; Kingdom of England
- Titles: in France: baron d'Harcourt; Baron of Elbeuf (1265); Count of Harcourt (1328); Count of Aumale; Baron of Olonde; Marquess of Beuvron (1528); Marquess of Thury; Count of Sézanne; Count of Lillebonne; Duke of Harcourt (1700) and peer of France (1709); Duke of Beuvron (1784); Marquess of Olonde-Harcourt; Marquess of Harcourt (confirmed in 1814) and peer of France (1814), etc.; in England: Baron Harcourt of Stanton Harcourt (1711–1830); Viscount Harcourt (1721–1830 and 1917–1979); Earl Harcourt and viscount Nuneham (1749–1830)

The House of Harcourt is a Norman family, and named after its seigneurie of Harcourt in Normandy. Its mottos were "Gesta verbis praeveniant" (Olonde branch), "Gesta verbis praevenient" (Beuvron branch), and "Le bon temps viendra ... de France" (English branch).

In 1280 they established the Collège d'Harcourt in Paris, now the Lycée Saint-Louis at 44 boulevard Saint-Michel.

== Origins ==
When in 911, the Viking chief Rollo was given the territories that would make up Normandy through the Treaty of Saint-Clair-sur-Epte, he distributed domains to his main supporters among those who had accompanied him on his expeditions against the English and the Neustrians. Considerable lands (notably the seigneurie of Harcourt, near Brionne) were granted to Bernard the Dane as a reward for his exploits, and from him they descended upon the lords (seigneurs) of Harcourt.

== French and English branches ==
The Harcourt family has been perpetuated up until the present day in a French branch and an English branch. The château d'Harcourt in Harcourt, Eure, Normandy, built around 1100, survives.

=== French branch ===
In France, Errand of Harcourt's brother, Robert I of Harcourt, sire of Harcourt, continued the Harcourt line in France. His descendants are sub-divided into several branches, with the two principal ones being the Olonde and Beuvron branches, which both descend to this day. The Harcourt family of France intermarried with other members of the French aristocracy, including the de Livet family. The Beuvron branch includes several marshal of France and lieutenant Generals of the ancien régime royal armies. These include

- François III of Harcourt (died 1705), marquis of Ectot and of Beuvron, lieutenant général of the "armées du roi" and the king's lieutenant général in Normandy
- Henri, first duke of Harcourt, marshal of France, ambassador to Madrid in 1697 (died 1718)
- Anne-Pierre, 4th duke of Harcourt, marshal of France, governor of Normandy (died 1783)
- Anne-Pierre's son François-Henri, 5th duke of Harcourt, governor of Normandy, representative of the comte de Provence to the British government during the French Revolution.
- George of Harcourt-Olonde (1808–1883), ambassador to London and Vienna.

In 1966, 126 English and French Harcourts celebrated the 1000-year anniversary of the House of Harcourt at the Château du Champ de Bataille, headed by the heads of the family, the Duke of Harcourt, head of the Beuvron branch, the Marquess of Olonde, and by the Viscount Harcourt.

=== English branch ===
In the 11th century, Errand of Harcourt and his three brothers followed William the Conqueror, duke of Normandy, on the Norman invasion of England, and the brothers were installed with English lands. The English Harcourt branch entered the English peerage, as barons then viscounts then earls. At first the Harcourts had lands in Leicestershire, but in 1191 Robert de Harcourt of Bosworth inherited lands of his father-in-law at Stanton in Oxfordshire, which then became known as Stanton Harcourt. The manor of Stanton Harcourt has remained in the Harcourt family to the present day, although from 1756 to 1948 their main residence was at Nuneham House, also in Oxfordshire. Simon Harcourt was created Baron Harcourt in 1711 and Viscount Harcourt in 1721. The third viscount was created Earl Harcourt in 1749, but all titles were extinguished with the death of marshal William Harcourt, 3rd Earl Harcourt, in 1830. His cousin Edward Vernon, Archbishop of York, thus inherited the majority of that branch's lands and titles and took the name and heraldic shield of the English Harcourt family by royal authorisation on 15 January 1831. This created the Vernon-Harcourt branch, descended from a Harcourt woman. The title Viscount Harcourt was created a second time in 1917 for Lewis Harcourt, but the title was again extinguished on the death of his son.

== The first lords of Harcourt ==
The first seigneurs of Harcourt from the early 11th to 13th centuries:

- Bernard the Dane, companion of Rollo, governor and regent of the duchy of Normandy until the death of William I, Duke of Normandy (942)
- Torf
- Turquetil (960–1020s), son of Torf and of Ertemberge of Briquebec. William the Conqueror's governor during his minority.
- Anquetil of Harcourt, son of Turquetil and of Anceline of Montfort, was the first seigneur of Harcourt known under this title. In 1066, he accompanied William the Conqueror on his conquest of England, obtaining lands in England. His possessions stretched along both sides of the English Channel. He married Ève of Boissey.
- Errand of Harcourt, seigneur of Harcourt, participated in the conquest of England on the side of William the Conqueror
- Robert I of Harcourt, called le Fort (the Strong), brother of Errand, whom he succeeded. He too took part in the conquest of England, but returned to Normandy. He built the first château d'Harcourt, and married Colette of Argouges.
- Guillaume of Harcourt, son of Robert I, he backed Henry I of England in his wars in Normandy. He married Hue of Amboise.
- Robert II of Harcourt, called le Vaillant (the Valiant) or le Fort (the Strong), son of Guillaume. He accompanied his suzerain Richard I of England on the Third Crusade and was designated by John of England as his surety and hostage in 1200 in the peace concluded with Philip II Augustus. He also became seigneur of Elbeuf by his 1179 marriage to Jeanne of Meulan.
- Richard, Baron of Harcourt, son of Robert II, in 1213 he married Jeanne de la Roche-Tesson, heiress of the vicomté of Saint-Sauveur
- Jean I (born c. 1200), called le Preud'Homme, baron of Harcourt, vicomte of Saint-Sauveur. Around 1240 he married Alix of Beaumont (d. 1275)

== The Harcourts and the Hundred Years' War ==
As with several Norman lords, several Harcourt possessions in England and France were placed in a difficult position during the wars between the Capetians and Plantagenets. In this context, the Harcourt family played a game all of its own, simultaneously independent of both the king of France and king of England. Geoffroy de Harcourt led King Edward III and the English Army into Normandy during the Crecy campaign as well as being involved in a reconnaissance mission that ended in a skirmish between Geoffroy de Harcourt and his elder brother, the Comte de Harcourt, at Rouen. Geoffroy de Harcourt was also one of those who guarded Edward, the Black Prince at the Battle of Crécy. Also, after Philip II's conquest of Normandy in 1204, the Harcourts habitually became the head of feudal movements against the king of France.

== Notable members of the House of Harcourt ==
The Harcourts have a great reputation in England and France as:

=== Statesmen and governors ===
- The likely fictitious Bernard the Dane, alleged founder of the house of Harcourt, governor and regent of the duchy of Normandy up to the death of duke Guillaume (942)
- Philippe d'Harcourt (died 1163), chancellor of England (1139–40)
- Louis d'Harcourt (died 1388), vicomte de Châtellerault, governor and lieutenant général of Normandy (1356–1360)
- Jacques I d'Harcourt (1350–1405), baron of Montgommery, councillor and chamberlain of king Charles VI
- Jacques II d'Harcourt (died 1428), comte de Tancarville, governor and lieutenant général of Picardie
- Christophe d'Harcourt (died 1438), lord of Havré, councillor and chamberlain of king Charles VII, grand-master of the waters and the forests
- Guillaume d'Harcourt (died 1487), comte de Tancarville, counsellor and chamberlain of king Charles VII, constable and chamberlain of Normandy, grand-master of the waters and the forests (1431)
- Henry d'Harcourt (1654–1718), 1st duke of Harcourt, member of the regency council (1715)
- Simon Harcourt (1661–1727), 1st viscount Harcourt, garde des Sceaux (1710–1713) and Lord Chancellor of Great Britain (1713–14)
- François d'Harcourt (1689–1750), 2nd duke of Harcourt, governor of Sedan (1735–50)
- Anne Pierre d'Harcourt (1701–1783), 4th duke of Harcourt, governor of Sedan (1750), governor of Normandy (1764–75)
- Simon Harcourt (1714–1777), 1st earl Harcourt, viceroy of Ireland (1772–77)
- François-Henri d'Harcourt (1726–1802), 5th duke of Harcourt, governor of Normandy (1775–89)
- Sir William Harcourt (1827–1904), secretary of state (home secretary, 1880–1885) then chancellor of the exchequer (1892–1895)
- Emmanuel d'Harcourt (1844–1928), vicomte d'Harcourt, secrétaire général de la présidence de la République (1873–1877), vice-president of the French Red Cross
- Lewis Harcourt (1863–1922), viscount Harcourt, minister for the colonies (1910–15) who gave his name to Port Harcourt (Nigeria)
- Mike Harcourt (born 1943), premier of British Columbia (Canada) from 1991 to 1996
- Claude d'Harcourt, prefect, ENA graduate

=== French and English marshals ===
- Jean II of Harcourt, called le Preux (died 1302), vicomte of Châtellerault, sire of Harcourt, maréchal de France in 1283 and amiral de France in 1295, husband of Jeanne de Châtellerault, vicomtesse of Châtellerault (1235–1315), daughter of Aimeri, vicomte de Châtellerault, and of Agathe de Dammartin
- Henry of Harcourt (1654–1718), 1st duke of Harcourt, marshal of France in 1703
- François of Harcourt (1689–1750), 2nd duke of Harcourt, marshal of France in 1746
- Anne Pierre of Harcourt (1701–1783), 4th duke of Harcourt, marshal of France in 1775
- Geoffroy de Harcourt, called Godefroy le boiteux (died 1356), made marshal by Edward III of England in 1346.
- William Harcourt, 3rd Earl Harcourt (1743–1830), promoted to field-marshal by king George IV in 1821

==== Spanish ====
- Rafael d´Harcourt Mediano Got

=== French and British ambassadors ===
- Henry d'Harcourt (1654–1718), 1st duke of Harcourt, extraordinary ambassador to Madrid (1697–1699 and 1700–1701), contributed to the installation of the Bourbons on the throne of Spain
- Simon Harcourt, 1st Earl Harcourt (1714–1777), British ambassador to Paris (1768–72)
- François-Henri d'Harcourt (1726–1802), 5th Duke of Harcourt, represented Louis XVIII to the British government (1792–1800)
- Eugène, 8th Duke of Harcourt (1786–1865): ambassador to Madrid (1830) and to Rome (1848–49)
  - Marie-Sophie d'Harcourt x Léon, 5th Duke d'Ursel (1805 – 1878).
  - Henriette d'Harcourt xx Léon, 5th Duke d'Ursel (1805 – 1878).
    - Marie Joseph Charles, 6th Duke d'Ursel
- Georges d'Harcourt (1808–1883), marquis d'Harcourt, pair de France, ambassador to Vienna (1873) and London (1875–79)
- Bernard d'Harcourt (1842–1914), ambassador to Rome (1871), to London (1872–73) and to Berne (1874–76)
- Emmanuel d'Harcourt (1914–1985), Compagnon de la Libération, ambassador to Dublin (1969) and to Prague (1975–79)

=== Governors of French and British heirs to the throne ===
- Henry of Harcourt (1654–1718), 1st duke of Harcourt, member of the regency council, named by Louis XIV in his will as governor of the Dauphin (the future Louis XV) following the maréchal de Villeroy
- Simon Harcourt, 1st Earl Harcourt (1714–1777), governor of the Prince of Wales, the future George III (1751–52)
- François-Henri d'Harcourt (1726–1802), 5th duke of Harcourt, governor of the dauphin of France (1786–89)

=== Generals ===
- Jean IV of Harcourt (died 1346), comte of Harcourt, captain of Rouen (1345), killed at the battle of Crécy
- Jean VII of Harcourt (1370–1452), comte of Harcourt, also called prince of Harcourt, captured at the battle of Agincourt
- Jean VIII of Harcourt (1396–1424), comte of Aumale, lieutenant and capitaine général de Normandy, killed at the battle of Verneuil
- Odet of Harcourt (1604–1661), marquis of Thury and of La Motte-Harcourt, lieutenant général des armées du roi
- Louis-François of Harcourt (1677–1714), comte of Sézanne, knight of the Order of the Golden Fleece, lieutenant général des armées du roi (1710)
- Henri-Claude d'Harcourt (1704–1769), comte of Harcourt, lieutenant général des armées du roi (1748)
- Anne-François d'Harcourt (1727–1797), duke of Beuvron, lieutenant général des armées du roi (1780)
- Charles-Hector d'Harcourt (1743–1820), marquis of Harcourt, pair de France, lieutenant général des armées du roi (1814)
- Marie-François d'Harcourt (1755–1839), 6th duke of Harcourt, lieutenant général des armées du roi (1815)
- Amédée d'Harcourt (1771–1831), marquis of Harcourt, pair de France, general in the English army
- Octavius Vernon Harcourt (1793–1863), admiral in the Royal Navy
- Frederick-Edward Vernon Harcourt (1790–1853), admiral in the Royal Navy
- Armand d'Harcourt (1883–1975), vice-admiral (1940), commandant of the French Navy of Morocco, president of the société centrale de sauvetage des naufragés
- Jean d'Harcourt (1885–1980), general in the air force (1939), inspector general of fighter aircraft, knight grand-cross of the Legion of Honour (1964)
- Louis d'Harcourt (1922-2014), French army corps general, Grand Officer of the Legion of Honor, member of the Order of the Holy Sepulchre

=== Resistance-workers ===
- Robert d'Harcourt (1881–1965) and his sons, Anne-Pierre d'Harcourt (1913–1981) and Charles d'Harcourt (1921–1992), both sent to Buchenwald concentration camp
- Emmanuel d'Harcourt (1914–1985), one of the first five Compagnons de la Libération, member of the counsel of the Ordre de la Libération

=== Churchmen ===
- Philip de Harcourt (died 1163), bishop of Salisbury (1140), bishop of Bayeux (1142), and chancellor of England (1139–1140)
- Raoul d'Harcourt (died 1307), canon of Paris (1305), counsellor of Philip IV of France, almoner of Charles, Count of Valois, founder of the collège d'Harcourt (Paris, now Lycée Saint-Louis)
- Robert d'Harcourt (died 1315), bishop of Coutances (1291), counsellor of Philip III and Philip IV of France.
- Guy d'Harcourt (died 1336), bishop of Lisieux (1303), founder of the collège de Lisieux (Paris)
- Jean d'Harcourt (died 1452), bishop of Amiens (1418), of Tournai (1433), archbishop of Narbonne (1436), patriarch of Antioch (1447), bishop of Alexandria and of Orleans (1451)
- Louis I d'Harcourt (1382–1422), vicomte de Châtellerault, archbishop of Rouen (1407)
- Louis II d'Harcourt (1424–1479), bishop of Béziers (1451), archbishop of Narbonne (1451), bishop of Bayeux (1460), patriarch of Jerusalem (1460–79)
- Louis-Abraham d'Harcourt (1694–1750), 3rd duke of Harcourt, chanoine de Notre-Dame de Paris, doyen de l'Eglise de Paris (1733), commander of the ordre du Saint-Esprit (1747)
- Edward Venables-Vernon-Harcourt (1757–1847), bishop of Carlisle, then archbishop of York

=== Members of the Académie française ===
- François-Henri of Harcourt (1726–1802), 5th duke of Harcourt, elected 1788
- Robert d'Harcourt (1881–1965), elected 1946

=== Scientists ===
- William Vernon Harcourt (1789–1871) was founder of the British Association for the Advancement of Science.

=== Authors ===
- Liceline d'Harcourt (c. 971–1035?), author of the Saga des Brionne
- Agnes d'Harcourt (c. 1245–1291?)
- Anne-Pierre d'Harcourt (1913–1981), author of The Real Enemy
- Claire d'Harcourt, author of several books, such as Bébés du monde and L'art à la loupe
- François-Henri of Harcourt (1726–1802)
- Robert d'Harcourt (1881–1965), author of several works on German literature and culture, such as L'évangile de la force (1936), one of the first books to denounce the dangers of Nazism, as well as a book of war memoirs, Souvenirs de captivité et d'évasion.
- David Stanton Milne Harcourt (1946–)
- Guillaume d'Harcourt (1986-) theater actor
