= Lords and Counts of Harcourt =

French noble title

When the Viking chieftain Rollo obtained the territories via the Treaty of Saint-Clair-sur-Epte which would later make up Normandy, he distributed them as estates among his main supporters. Among these lands were the seigneurie of Harcourt, near Brionne, and the county of Pont-Audemer, both of which Rollo granted to Bernard the Dane, ancestor of the lords (seigneurs) of Harcourt. The first to use Harcourt as a name, however, was Anquetil d'Harcourt at the start of the 11th century.

== Lords of Harcourt ==
=== House of Harcourt ===
- c.911–c.950 : Bernard the Dane, governor and regent of the duchy of Normandy in 943
  married Sprote, princess of Bourgogne
- c.950–c.960 : Torf le Riche, baron de Tourville, son of Bernard
  married Ertemberge de Bricquebec
- c.960–c.1020 : Turquetil
  married Anceline de Montfort-sur-Risle
- c.1020 – aft. 1066 : Anquetil d'Harcourt, son of Turquetil
  married Ève de Boissey
- aft. 1066 – aft. 1078 : Errand d'Harcourt, son of Anquetil
  married Emme d'Estouteville
- aft. 1078 – aft. 1100 : Robert I of Harcourt, Brother of Errand
  married Colette d'Argouges.
- aft. 1100 – aft. 1124 : William of Harcourt, son of Robert I
  married Hue d'Amboise.
- aft. 1124–1212 : Robert II of Harcourt, seigneur d'Elbeuf, son of William
  married Jeanne de Meulan in 1179
- 1212–1239 : Richard, Baron of Harcourt (d. 1239), son of Robert II
  married Jeanne de la Roche-Tesson, heiress of the Viscount of Saint-Sauveur, in 1213
- 1239–1288 : John I of Harcourt (1199–1288), son of Richard
  married Alix de Beaumont
- 1288–1302 : John II of Harcourt (1240–1302), marshal and admiral of France, son of John I
  married first Agnès de Lorraine, daughter of Frederick III, Duke of Lorraine
  married second Jeanne de Châtellerault
- 1302–1329 : John III of Harcourt (d. 1329), son of John II and Jeanne de Châtellerault
  married Alix de Reginar, daughter of Godfrey of Brabant.

== Counts of Harcourt ==
The barony of Harcourt was erected into the county of Harcourt, together with the seigneuries of Lillebonne, Troispierres, La Saussaye and Elbeuf, by letters patent of Philip VI in March 1338.

=== House of Harcourt ===

- 1329–1346 : John IV (d. 1346), Count of Harcourt in 1338, son of John III
  married Isabeau de Parthenay, dame de Vibraye, de Montfort-le-Rotrou, d'Aspremont and de Bonnétable
- 1346–1356 : John V (d. 5 April 1356, Rouen), son of John IV
  married Blanche de Ponthieu, Countess of Aumale, sister of Joan of Ponthieu, Dame of Epernon
- 1355–1389 : John VI (1342–1389), son of John V
  married Catherine de Bourbon (d. 1427), daughter of Peter I, Duke of Bourbon, in 1359
- 1389–1452 : John VII (1370–1452), son of John VI
  married Marie d'Alençon (1373–1417), daughter of Pierre II, Count of Alençon, in 1390

His only son, John VIII, was killed in battle in 1424. Upon the death of John VII in 1452, his inheritance was to be divided between his elder daughter, Marie, wife of Antoine, Count of Vaudémont, and his second daughter, Jeanne, wife of Jean III de Rieux. However, Marie and her son John of Vaudémont were able to control the entire inheritance until 1454, when the de Rieux gained control of the County of Aumale. However, litigation continued between the de Rieux and the Vaudémont-Lorraine through the late 15th century.

=== House of Vaudémont-Lorraine ===

- 1454–1476 : Marie, Countess of Harcourt, daughter of John VII, with:
  her husband Antoine, Count of Vaudémont 1454–1458
  her son John of Vaudémont 1458–1473
  her grandson René II, Duke of Lorraine 1473–1476
- 1476–1495 : René II, Duke of Lorraine

=== House of Rieux ===

The de Rieux continued to maintain their claims on Harcourt. Jeanne (1399–1456), the daughter of John VII, had married Jean III de Rieux (1377–1431) in 1414. She was succeeded by her son François de Rieux (1418–1458), who married Jeanne de Rohan in 1442 and was succeeded by his son Jean IV de Rieux. He reached a settlement with the Duke of Lorraine in 1495, trading Aumale for Harcourt, and resumed the title.

- 1495–1518 : Jean IV de Rieux (1447–1518), son of François
  married Isabelle de Brosse (died 1527), daughter of John VI, Count of Penthièvre
- 1518–1532 : Claude de Rieux (1497–1532), son of Jean IV
  married Suzanne de Bourbon-Montpensier (died 1570), daughter of Louis de Bourbon, Prince de La Roche-sur-Yon and Louise de Montpensier
- 1532–1557 : Henri de Rieux (died 1557), son of Claude, died without issue

Upon the death of Henri, the county of Harcourt passed to his sister Louise, who had married René, Marquis of Elbeuf, head of a cadet branch of the House of Lorraine.

=== House of Lorraine ===

- 1557–1570 : Louise de Rieux (1531–1570), sister of Henri
  married René, Marquis of Elbeuf (1536–1566) in 1555
- 1566–1605 : Charles I, Duke of Elbeuf (1556–1605), son of René
  married Marguerite de Chabot (1565–1652) in 1583
- 1605–1666 : Henri, Count of Harcourt (1601–1666), younger son of Charles I

- 1666–1694 : François Louis, Count of Harcourt, (1627–1694), nephew of Henri, son of Charles II, Duke of Elbeuf
  married Anne d'Ornano (died 1695) in 1645
- 1694–1718 : Alphonse Henri, Count of Harcourt (1648–1718), styled the prince d'Harcourt, son of François Louis
  married Marie Françoise de Brancas (died 1715) in 1667
- 1719–1739 : Joseph, Count of Harcourt (1679–1739), styled the prince d'Harcourt, son of Alphonse
  married Marie Louise Chrétienne Jeannin de Castille (1680–1736) in 1705
- 1739–1747 : Louis Marie Léopold de Lorraine (1720–1747), styled the prince d'Harcourt, son of Joseph

== Modern titles ==
"Harcourt" has been given as a title to descendants of cadet branches of the family of Harcourt, without a territorial connection to the medieval county. Both branches descend from Philippe d'Harcourt (1353–1403), Lord of Bonnétable, son of John V of Harcourt.

=== Dukes of Harcourt ===
The title of duc d'Harcourt was granted in 1700 by Louis XIV to Henry d'Harcourt (1654–1718), marshal of France, of the branch of Beuvron, upon the erection of the marquisate de La Mothe and de Thury to a duchy, with the name of Harcourt. The title was made a peerage in 1709, by letters patent. Their most famous residence was the Château du Champ-de-Bataille.

- 1700–1718 : Henry d'Harcourt (1654–1718), duc d'Harcourt, marshal of France
  married Marie Anne Claude de Brulart de Genlis (1669–1750) in 1687
- 1700–1750 : François d'Harcourt (1689–1750), duc d'Harcourt, marshal of France, son of Henry
  married Marguerite Sophie Louise de Neufville (1699–1716) in 1716, then in 1717 Marie Madeleine Le Tellier (1697–1735)
- 1750–1783 : Anne Pierre d'Harcourt (1701–1783), duc d'Harcourt, marshal of France, brother of François
  married Eulalie de Beaupoil de Sainte-Aulaire (1715–1738) in 1725
- 1783–1802 : François-Henri d'Harcourt (1726–1802), duc d'Harcourt, son of Anne
  married Françoise Cathérine d'Aubusson de la Feuillade (1733–1815) in 1752
- 1802–1839 : Marie François (1755–1839), duc d'Harcourt, nephew of François-Henri
  married Madeleine Jacqueline Le Veneur de Tillières (died 1825) in 1780
- 1839–1840 : Alphonse Aymar François (1785–1840), duc d'Harcourt, son of Marie
- 1840–1846 : François-Eugène Gabriel (1786–1865), duc d'Harcourt, brother of Alphonse
  married Aglaé Terray (1788–1867) in 1807
- Henri Marie Nicolas (1808–1846), marquis d'Harcourt, son of François (predeceased his father)
  married Slanie de Choiseul-Praslin (1807–1843) in 1829
- 1846–1895 : Charles François Marie (1835–1895), duc d'Harcourt, son of Henri
  married Marie (1843–1916), comtesse de Mercy-Argenteau, in 1862
- 1895–1908 : Henri Eugène François Marie (1864–1908), duc d'Harcourt, son of Charles
  married Marie de la Rochefoucauld (1871–1952) in 1892
- 1908–1997 : Charles Jean Marie (1902–1997), duc d'Harcourt, son of Henri
  married Antoinette Gérard (1909–1958) in 1927, then in 1961 Maria Teresa de Zayas (born 1930)
- 1997-2020 : François Henri (1928-2020), duc d'Harcourt, son of Charles
  married Isabelle Roubeau (1961-)
- 2020-present : Geoffroy (1952-), duc d'Harcourt, cousin of François
  married Hélène de Nicolay (1962-)
