= Richard, Baron of Harcourt =

13th-century French nobleman

Richard of Harcourt (died before 1242) was Baron of Harcourt, Saint-Sauveur-le-Vicomte and Auvers, Lord of Elbeuf, Bourgtheroulde-Infreville, La Saussaye, Brionne, Beaumont-le-Roger, Angeville, and Saint-Nicolas-du-Bosc, and others.

== Biography ==
Richard of Harcourt was the son of Robert II of Harcourt and Jeanne of Meulan, Dame of Meulan and Brionne.

He was named in 1210 as one of the chevaliers to King Philip II Augustus of France and was invited to assist the crowning of King Louis IX at Rheims on 29 November 1226.

In September 1235, he was summoned by King Saint Louis to Saint-Denis with the thirty principal lords and barons of France to oppose the imposition of royal justice into earthly affairs. They were supported by Pope Gregory IX on this subject, as well as the Duke of Burgundy and the Count of Brittany.

He died before 1242.

== Descendants ==
From his marriage to Mathilde Tesson, Dame of Saint-Sauveur, Auvers and Avrilly, he had ten children:

- Jean I of Harcourt, Baron of Harcourt
- Raoul of Harcourt, father of the branch of Lords of Avrilly
- Robert of Harcourt, Lord of Beaumesnil, father of the branch of Lords of Beaumesnil
- Amaury of Harcourt, Lord of Elbeuf, killed at the battle of Perpignan in 1285
- André of Harcourt, Lord of Cailleville
- Hugues of Harcourt, Lord of Poligny
- Jeanne of Harcourt, nun at Longchamp Abbey
- Perrette of Harcourt, married Jean II of Hellenvillers
- Alix of Harcourt, married Philippe of Pérusse, Lord of Lavauguyon
- Marguerite of Harcourt

== See also ==
- House of Harcourt
- Lords and Counts of Harcourt
- château d'Harcourt

== Notes and references ==
- La Chenaye Desbois, Dictionnaire de la noblesse de France
- Gilles-André de La Roque, Histoire généalogique de la maison de Harcourt, 1662
- Dom Le Noir, Preuves généalogiques et historiques de la Maison de Harcourt, 1907
- Georges Martin, Histoire et Généalogie de la Maison d'Harcourt, 1994
