= Sainte-Opportune-du-Bosc =

- Commune
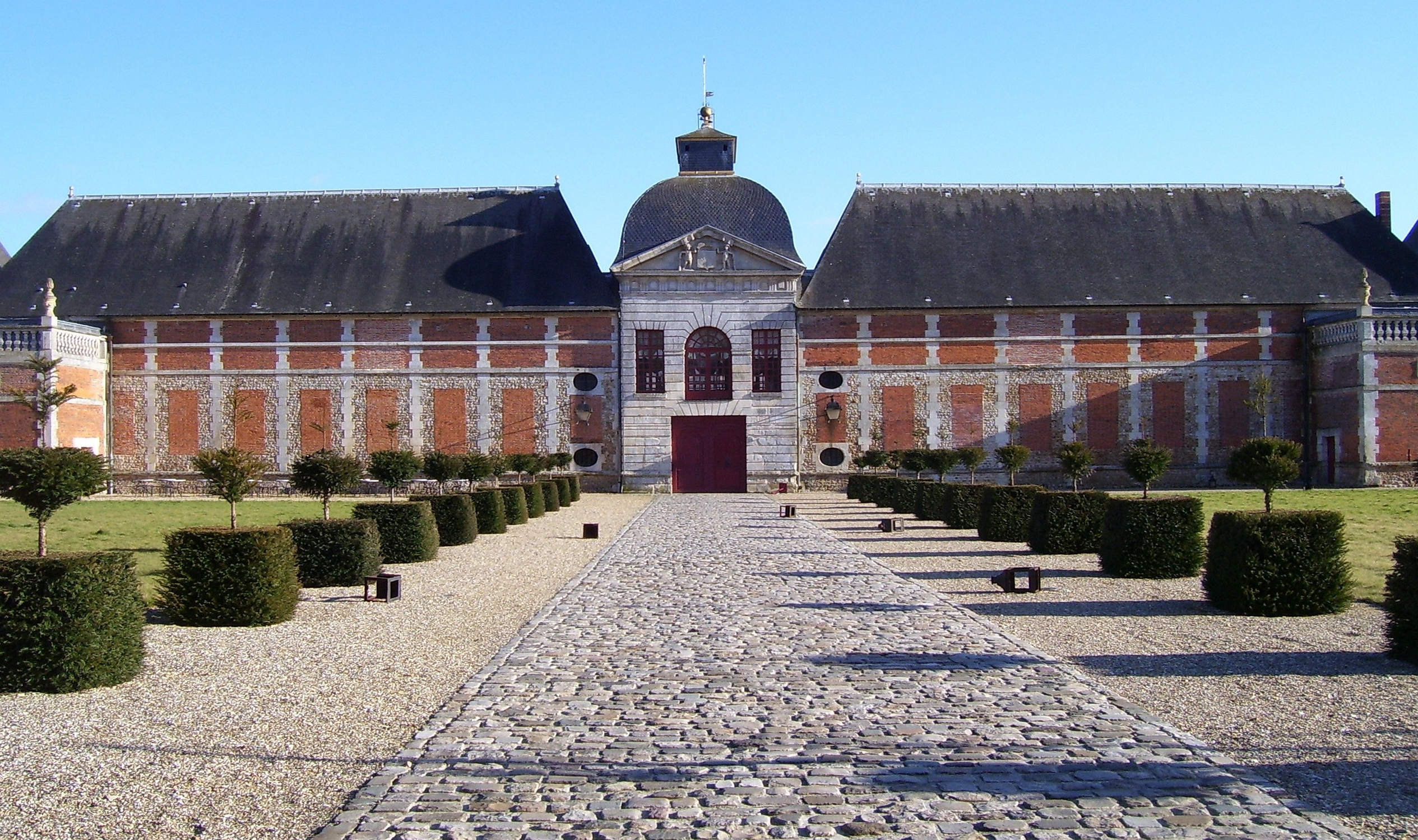
- The entrance to the Chateau du Champ-de-Bataille, in Sainte-Opportune-du-Bosc
- Location of Sainte-Opportune-du-Bosc
- Location within France Location within Normandy
- Coordinates: 49°09′42″N 0°50′17″E
- Country: France
- Region: Normandy
- Department: Eure
- Arrondissement: Bernay
- Canton: Brionne

Government
  - Mayor (2020–2026): Jérôme Henon
- Area^{1}: 8.07 km^{2} (3.12 sq mi)
- Highest elevation: 150 m (490 ft)
- Lowest elevation: 97 m (318 ft)
- Population (2023): 628
  - Density: 77.8/km^{2} (202/sq mi)
- Time zone: UTC+01:00 (CET)
  - Summer (DST): UTC+02:00 (CEST)
- INSEE/Postal code: 27576 /27110
- ^{1} French Land Register data, which excludes lakes, ponds, glaciers > 1 km^{2} (0.386 sq mi or 247 acres) and river estuaries.

Sainte-Opportune-du-Bosc is a commune in the Eure department in Normandy in northern France.

== History ==
In 935 a big battle between William I, Duke of Normandy and Robert II took place near the town. The battlefield was called Champ-de-Bataille later and in the 17th century the Marshall of Créqui built a castle there.

The Château du Champ de Bataille was owned by the Harcourt family and has formal gardens designed by Le Nôtre.

== Population ==
Historical population
Year	Pop.	±% p.a.
1968	145	—
1975	141	−0.40%
1982	192	+4.51%
1990	278	+4.74%
1999	334	+2.06%
2007	595	+7.48%
2012	664	+2.22%
2017	648	−0.49%
2023	628	−0.52%
Source: INSEE

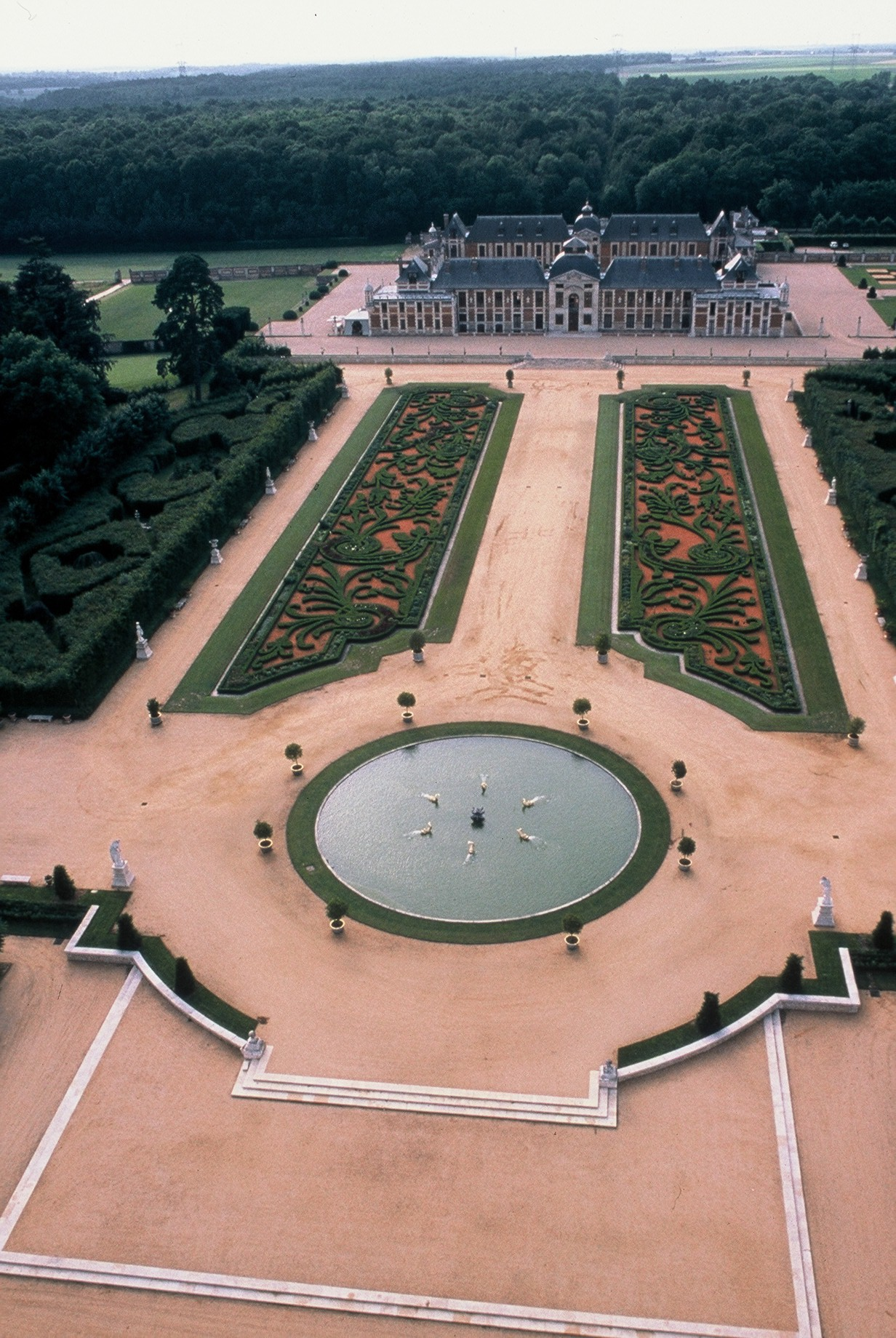
Château du Champ-de-Bataille

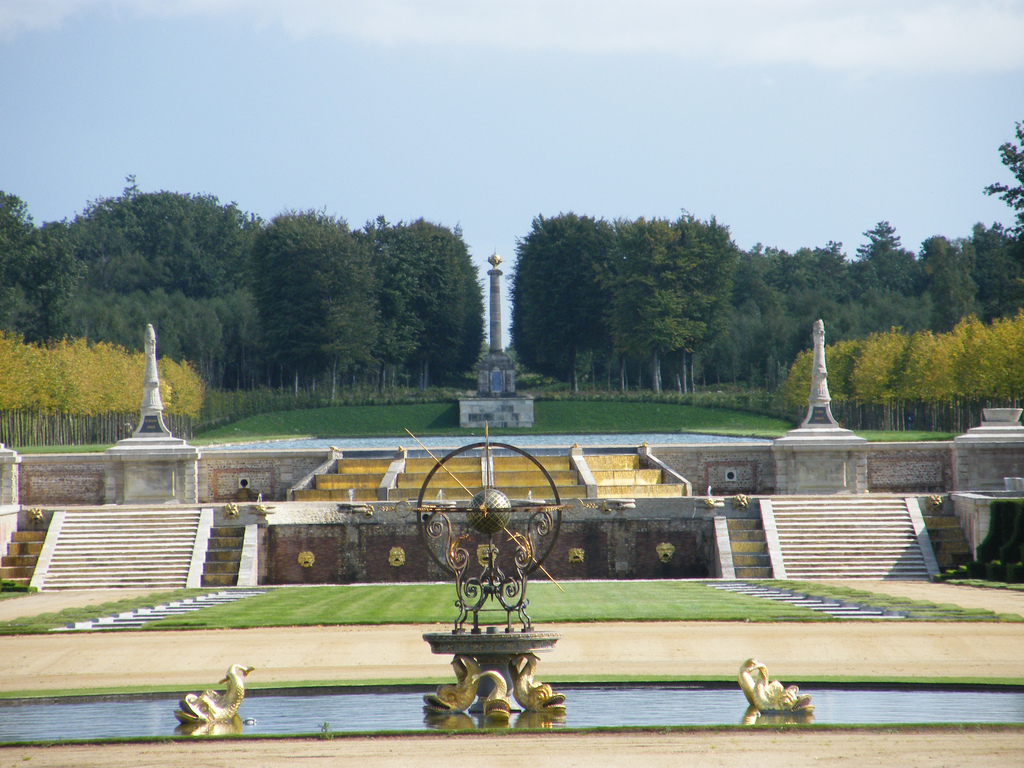
Detail of the garden of the castle

== See also ==
- Communes of the Eure department
