= Thury-Harcourt =

Commune in Calvados, France

- Part of Thury-Harcourt-le-Hom
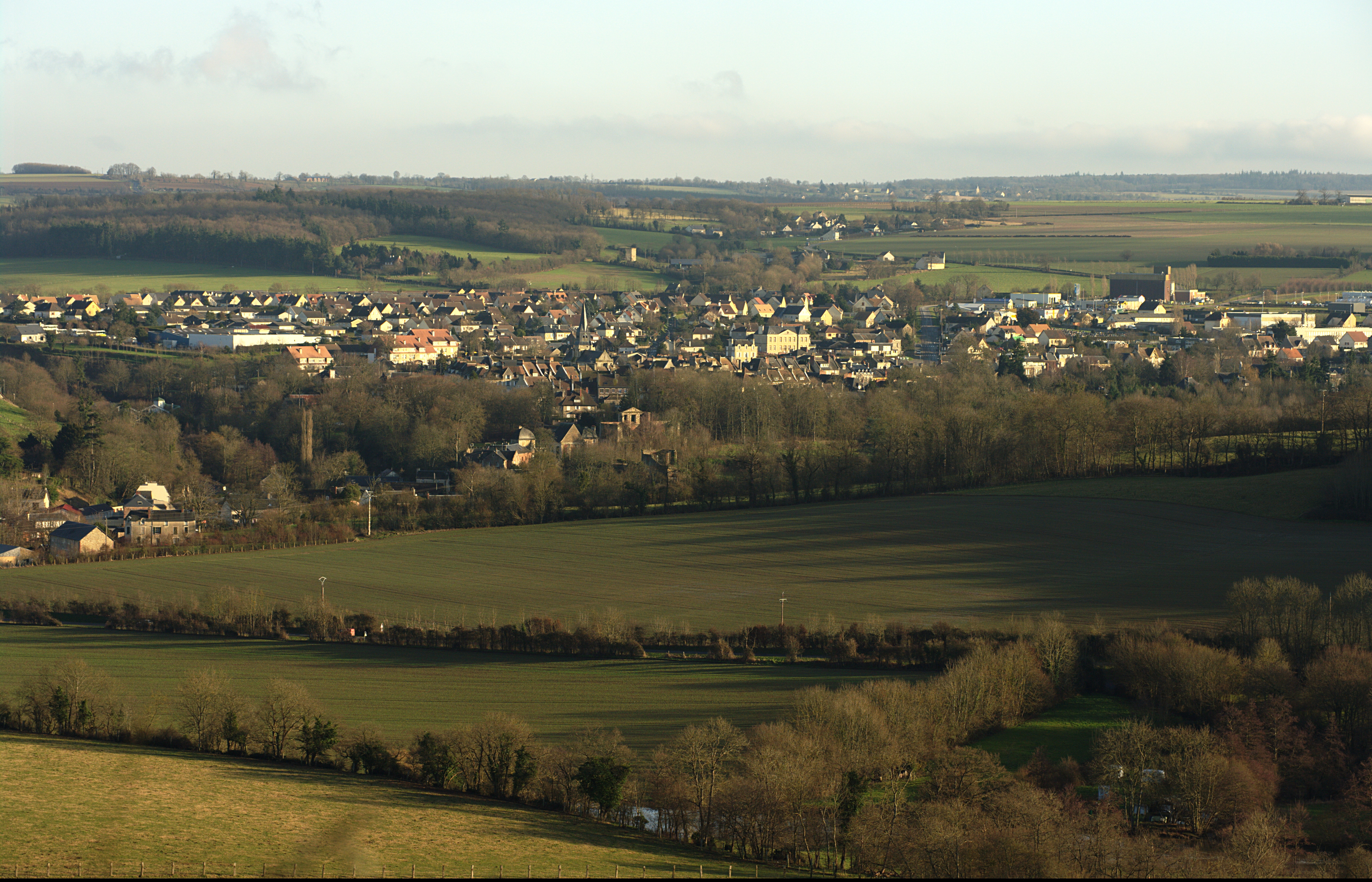

- Coat of arms
- Location of Thury-Harcourt
- Location within France Location within Normandy
- Coordinates: 48°59′02″N 0°28′23″W
- Country: France
- Region: Normandy
- Department: Calvados
- Arrondissement: Caen
- Canton: Le Hom
- Commune: Thury-Harcourt-le-Hom
- Area^{1}: 4.90 km^{2} (1.89 sq mi)
- Elevation: 100 m (330 ft)
- Highest elevation: 156 m (512 ft)
- Lowest elevation: 18 m (59 ft)
- Population (2022): 1,996
  - Density: 407/km^{2} (1,060/sq mi)
- Time zone: UTC+01:00 (CET)
  - Summer (DST): UTC+02:00 (CEST)
- Postal code: 14220
- ^{1} French Land Register data, which excludes lakes, ponds, glaciers > 1 km^{2} (0.386 sq mi or 247 acres) and river estuaries.

Thury-Harcourt (French pronunciation: [tyʁi aʁkuʁ]) is a former commune in the Calvados department in the Normandy region in northwestern France. On 1 January 2016, it was merged into the new commune of Thury-Harcourt-le-Hom. The town is 24 kilometres (15 mi) south of Caen, in the Orne valley. It is part of Norman Switzerland, which attracts visitors for various sports and outdoor activities with its hilly terrain.

== History ==
The original name is Thury, but the Marquis of Thury received a benefice from Henry d'Harcourt under the name of the Duke of Harcourt in 1709, requiring a change of name. The town was occupied by the forces of Nazi Germany in June 1940 after France's surrender ended the Battle of France. For four years the village lived under Nazi occupation as part of the German military administration in occupied France during World War II. Thury-Harcourt was liberated by British soldiers who were part of the 59th (Staffordshire) Infantry Division. The 59th (Staffordshire) Infantry Division fought their way into and through Thury-Harcourt in August 1944.

== Administration ==
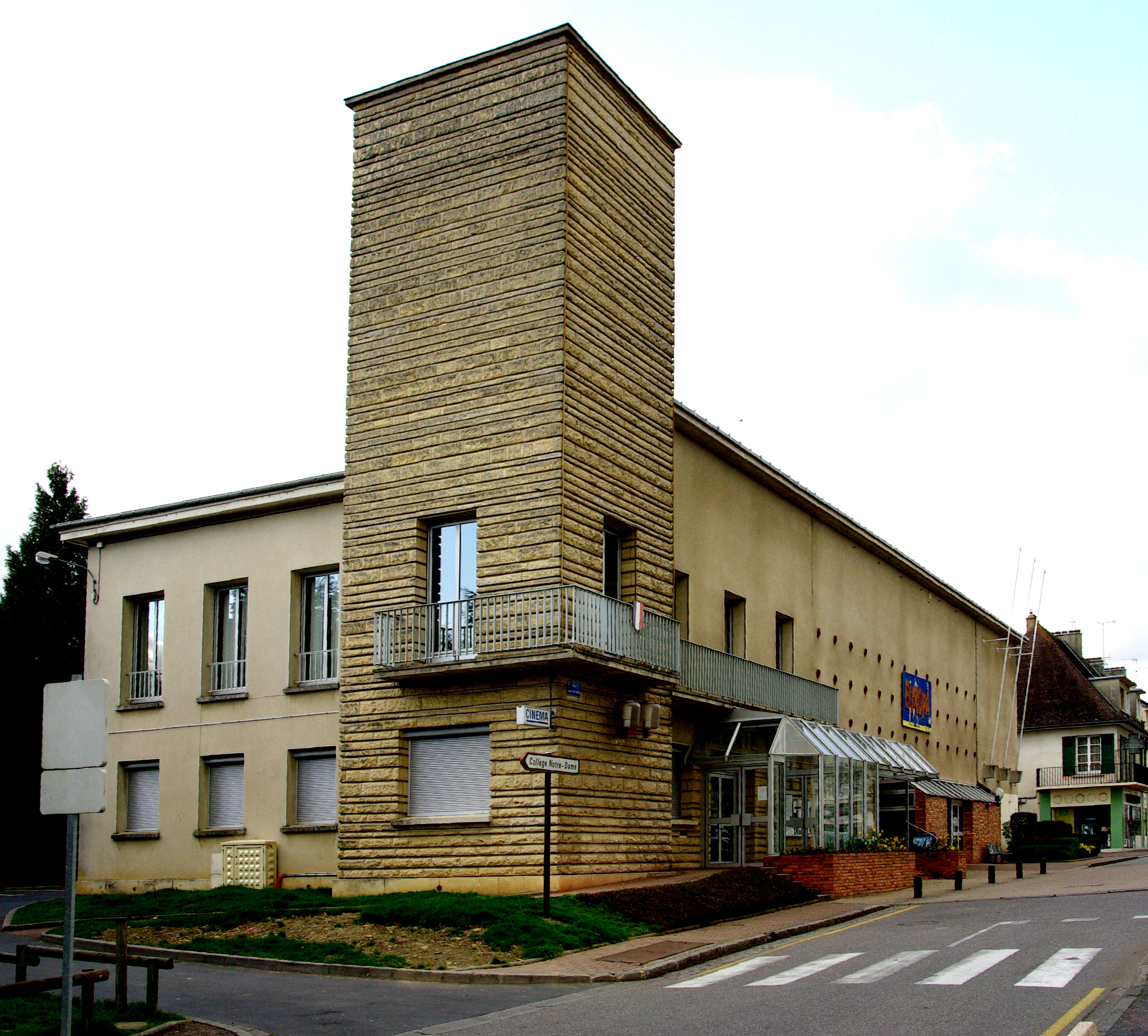
Town hall

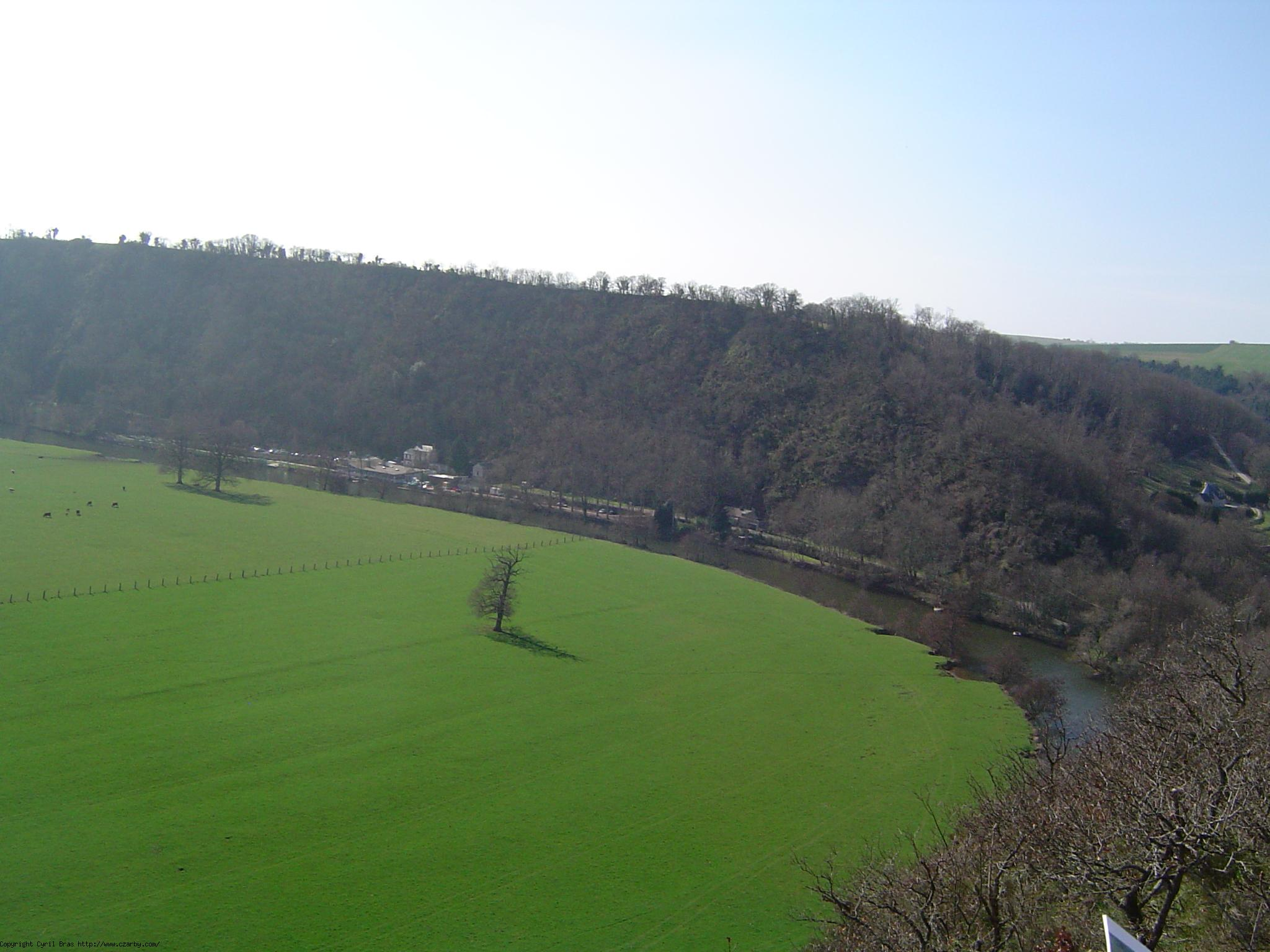
The Orne valley takes an oxbow curve near Thury-Harcourt

At the local elections of March 2014, the mayor Paul Chandelier was re-elected. The municipal council consists of 19 members, including the mayor and 5 deputy mayors.

== Population ==
Historical population
Year	Pop.	±% p.a.
1962	1,191	—
1968	1,190	−0.01%
1975	1,363	+1.96%
1982	1,586	+2.19%
1990	1,803	+1.62%
1999	1,825	+0.13%
2006	1,813	−0.09%
2022	1,996	+0.60%
Source: EHESS and INSEE

== Sights ==
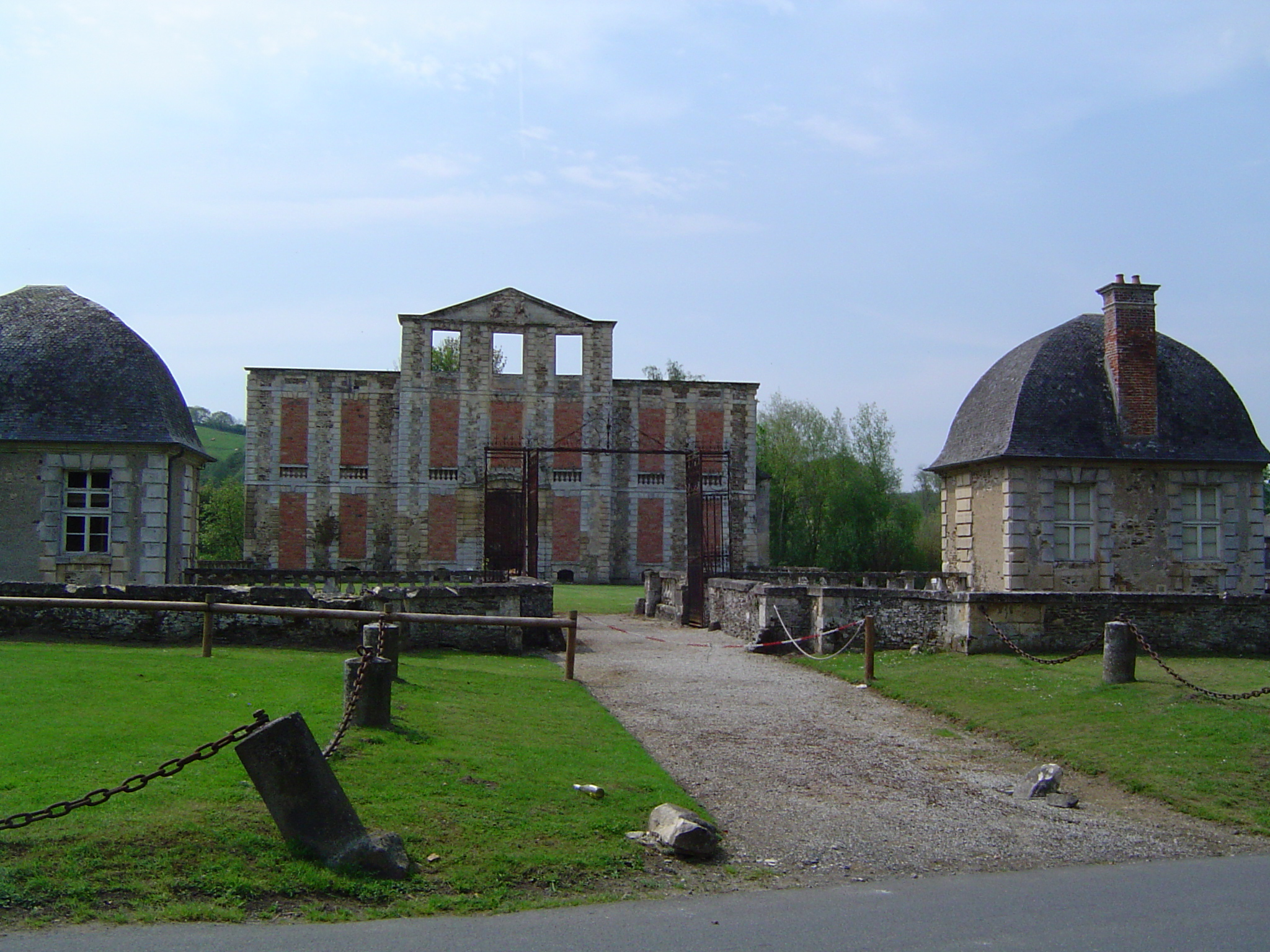
Frontage of the Château of Thury-Harcourt

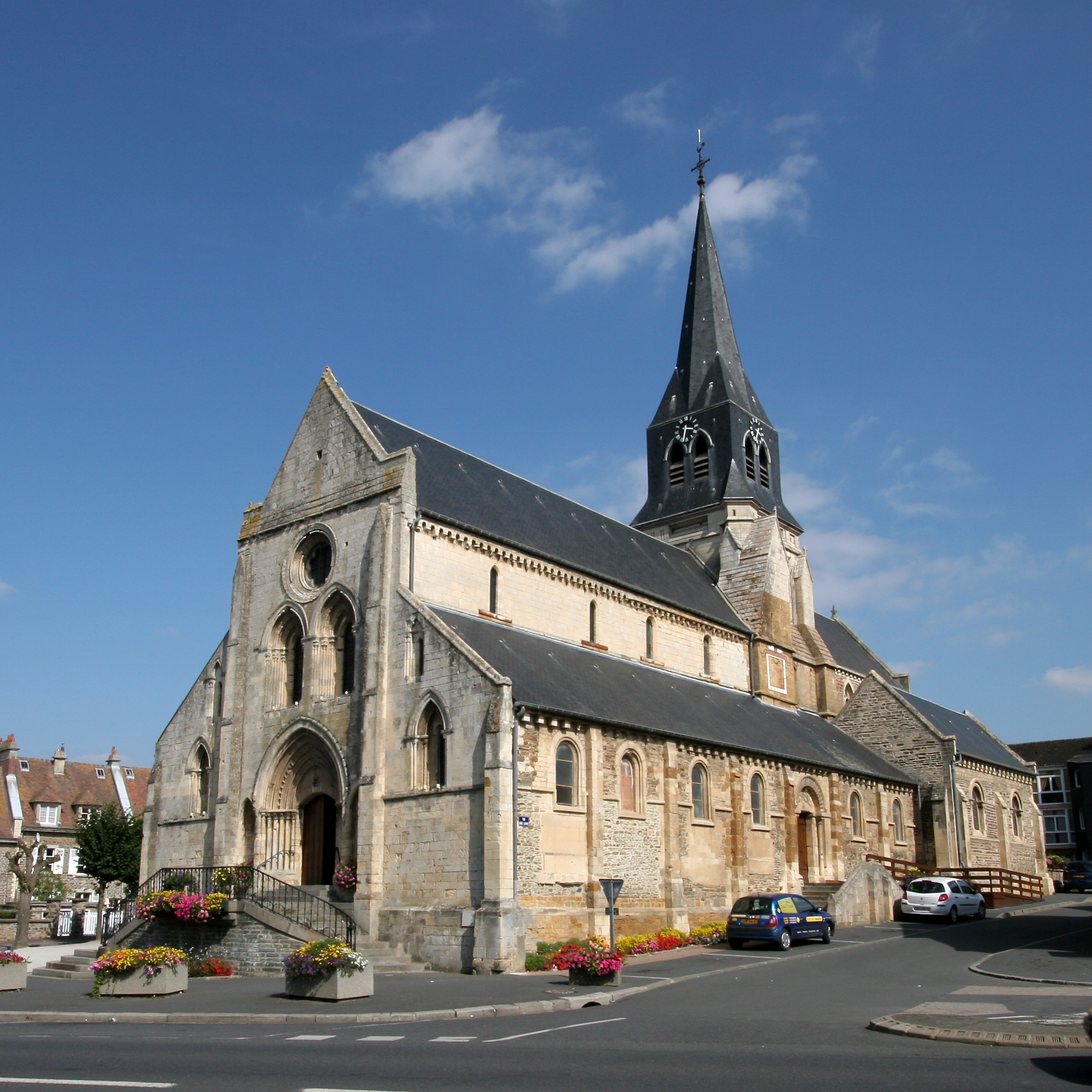
Saint Sauveur Church

- The park and gardens of the Château of the Dukes of Harcourt were constructed in 1635 by Odet d'Harcourt and expanded upon in 1714 and 1723.

In the battles of the Second World War, after the Normandy landings the town was bombed for the first time on 30 June 1944; the château escaped damage. It was during fierce fighting against the British 59th (Staffordshire) Infantry Division on 13–4 August 1944 that the German forces retreated from the town and set fire to the chateau, which had suffered little damage up to that point. The fire destroyed many public archives, a library of nearly 15,000 volumes, and hundreds of family records.

- Roman Catholic church of Saint Sauveur, 12th century, in the middle of the town. It was bombed in the summer of 1944, and only the nave remained. It has now been restored to what it was before the war.

Thury-Harcourt railway station was destroyed by air strikes in 1944 and reconstructed in the 1950s. The passenger line opened in 1873 and was closed in 1971. Freight service stopped in 1983. A tourist train from Louvigny (close to Caen) to Clécy operated from 1991 to 1994.

- The village of Saint-Benin merged with Thury-Harcourt in 1858. Its Roman Catholic church is from the 16th century. The gothic choir is in good condition, but the nave was lost in a fire in the 19th century. The church is constructed from limestone and mortar. It has a gable roof, crowned with a cross. The belltower is supported by four 13th-century buttresses, decorated with gargoyles bearing human faces.
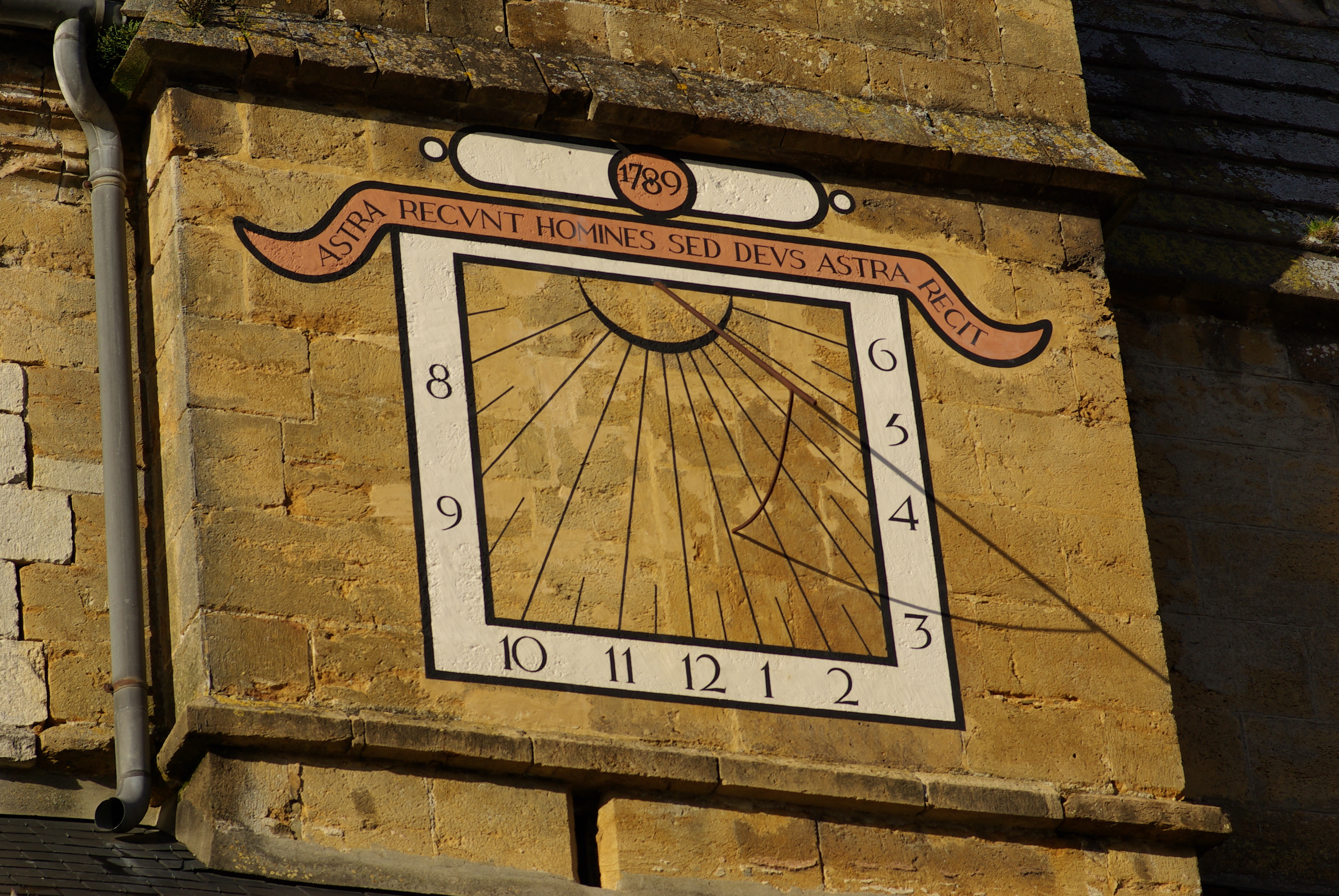
The sundial on the belltower of Saint-Sauveur church

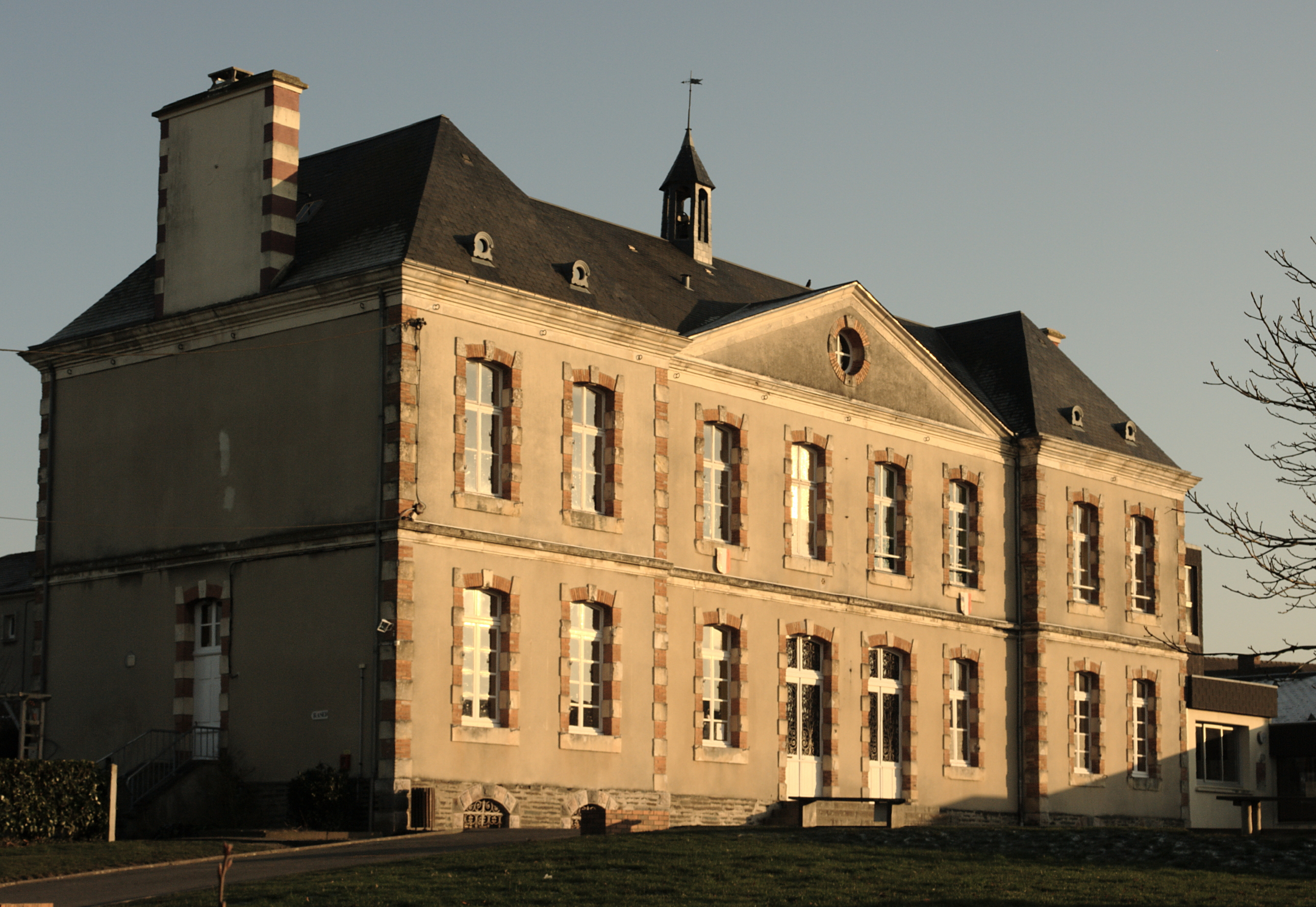
The Paul Héroult school

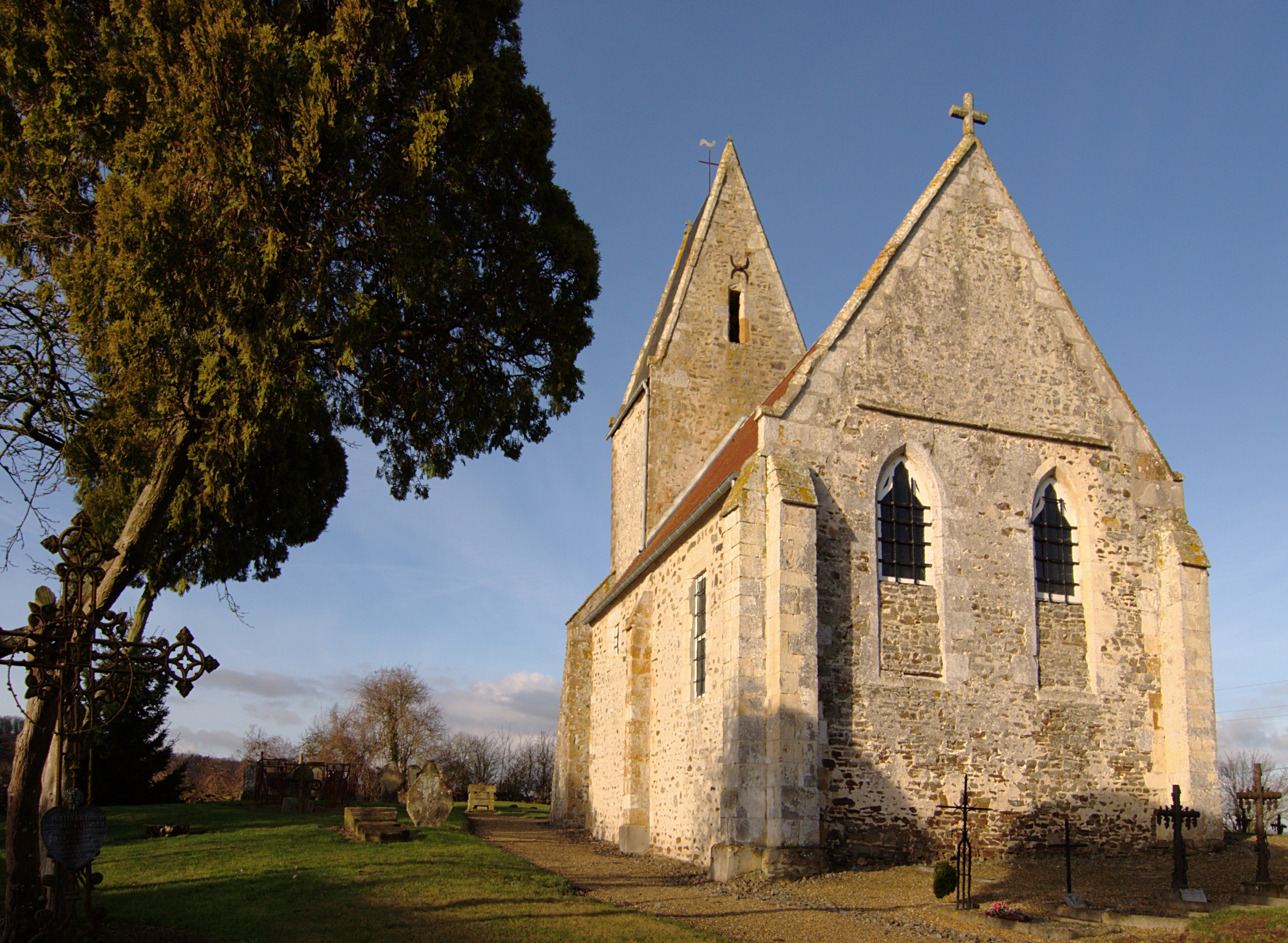
The Saint-Benin church

== Notable people ==
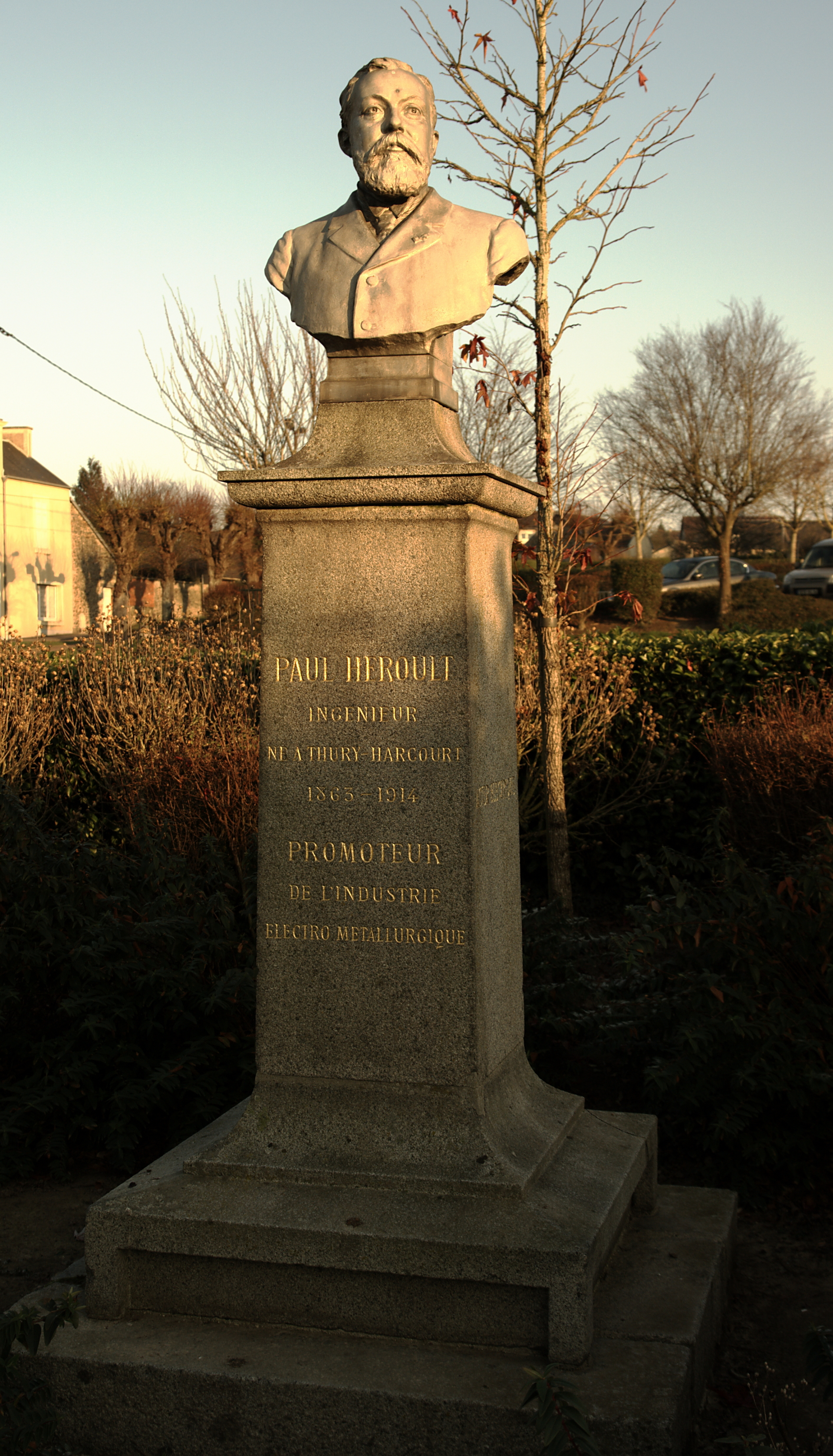
Statue of Paul Heroult

- Pierre Gringore, the poet laureate of Louis XII, was born here.
- In 1863 Paul Héroult, invented the extraction of aluminium by electrometallurgy. He also invented the electric oven in 1900.
- Jean Le Sueur (1598–1668), priest of the parish, accompanied many local families in their migration to Canada. He became the first secular priest in New France (now Quebec).
- Jean Baptiste Legardeur de Repentigny, born at Thury-Harcourt about 1632, first master of Québec.
- Raoul Tesson, (1150–1213) Vicomte de Saint Sauveur, Seigneur de Thury et de la Roche Tesson, Sénéchal de Normandie.
- Maurice Delaunay (1901–1995), politician, leader of Calvados 1936-1940.

== Events ==
In the sixteenth century many families emigrated to Canada, taking with them the curate and abbot of the parish, (Lesueur). He founded the parish Saint-Sauveur, Quebec. Pierre Legardeur got general control of Nouvelle-France and gave his name to the towns of Le Gardeur and Repentigny in Quebec.

=== Sporting events ===
The commune has hosted two major Canoe polo events, the 2007, European championship and 2014 ICF World Championships.

== See also ==
- Communes of the Calvados department
