= Robert d'Harcourt =

French intellectual, scholar and anti-Nazi polemicist (1881–1965)

Robert d'Harcourt (23 November 1881 – 18 June 1965) was a French Catholic intellectual, scholar of German culture and anti-Nazi polemicist.

== Early years ==
A member of the aristocratic Norman House of Harcourt, d'Harcourt was born at Lumigny-Nesles-Ormeaux in Seine-et-Marne, the second son and fourth child of Count Pierre d'Harcourt and Adelaide-Alix de Mun. He was the nephew of Albert de Mun, a half-brother of his mother.

D'Harcourt studied Germanic literature at university. His doctoral dissertation was on the Swiss poet and novelist Conrad Ferdinand Meyer.

During World War I, d'Harcourt served in the artillery with the rank of sergeant. He was severely wounded twice during the conflict. Eventually taken prisoner, he recounted his experiences in his memoir, Souvenirs de captivité et d'évasion d'un camp de Bavière. After the war, he obtained the chair of German language and literature at the Institut catholique de Paris.

== Anti-Nazism ==
D'Harcourt's knowledge of German culture and his anti-Nazi views led him to publish numerous detailed articles attacking the new Nazi regime after Hitler achieved power in 1933. In 1936 he published l'Évangile de la force (The Gospel of Force), his best-known work. It was a harsh attack on Nazism and particularly drew attention to the indoctrination of young Germans in Nazi ideology. Harcourt stressed the incompatibility between the radical racist nature of Nazi ideology and Christianity.

During the Occupation, d'Harcourt became a leading intellectual figure in the Resistance, publishing in the clandestine press. His two sons, Anne-Pierre d'Harcourt (1913–1981) and Charles d'Harcourt (1921–1992), were both sent to Buchenwald concentration camp but survived the war.

== Post-war ==
After the war d'Harcourt was one of five new members elected on 14 February 1946 to the Académie française. This group election was caused by many vacancies resulting from the war. He was received on 30 January 1947 by Henry Bordeaux, with André Bellessort in the chair. Most of d'Harcourt's later publications were about the culture and politics of post-war Germany under Konrad Adenauer.

D'Harcourt died in 1965, and rests in the cemetery of Pargny-lès-Reims.

== Private life ==
In July 1912, Harcourt married Ghislaine de Caraman-Chimay (1894–1965), daughter of Prince Pierre de Riquet de Caraman-Chimay. Their son Anne-Pierre married firstly Florence d'Harcourt, with whom he had one daughter, Sophie d'Harcourt (born 1947), and secondly Laurian Jones, the only daughter of Enid Bagnold and Sir Roderick Jones.

== Works ==
- C. F. Meyer, sa vie, son œuvre (1825–1898), 1913
- Souvenirs de captivité et d'évasions 1915–1918, 1922
- La Jeunesse de Schiller, 1928
- L'Éducation sentimentale de Goethe, 1931
- Goethe et l'Art de vivre, 1935
- L'Évangile de la force, le visage de la jeunesse du IIIe Reich, 1936
- Catholiques d'Allemagne, 1938
- Le Nazisme peint par lui-même, 1946
- Les Allemands d'aujourd'hui, 1948
- La Religion de Goethe, 1949
- Visage de l'Allemagne actuelle, 1950
- Konrad Adenauer, 1955
- L'Allemagne d'Adenauer, 1958
- L'Allemagne et l'Europe, Allemagne européenne, 1960
- L'Allemagne, d'Adenauer à Erhard, 1964
