= François d'Harcourt (Marshal of France) =

François, Duke of Harcourt (November 6, 1689 – Saint-Germain-en-Laye, July 10, 1750), was a military officer in 18th-century France. He participated in the War of the Spanish Succession, the War of the Polish Succession, and the War of the Austrian Succession. He ended his military career in 1749 with the title of Marshal of France.

== Biography ==
He was the eldest son of Henri d'Harcourt, 1st Duke of Harcourt (1654–1718), Peer and (1703) Marshal of France, and Marie Anne Claude Brulart de Genlis (1669–1750), Dame de Pisy. Upon his father's death on October 19, 1718, he inherited his title as Duke of Harcourt, which was confirmed by the Parliament in Paris on January 19, 1719.

In the War of the Spanish Succession, he fought in the Battle of Ramillies (1706) and as a Colonel of his own cavalry regiment in the Battle of Oudenaarde (1708) and on the Rhine. In 1712, the King appointed him Mestre de camp to command the Dauphin's Cavalry Regiment. He continued to serve under his father's command in the "Armée du Rhin" until the end of the war.

He was made a Maréchal de camp on April 24, 1728, and a knight of the King's Orders on May 16.
During the War of the Polish Succession, he fought in Italy and participated in the Battle of Guastalla.
In January 1739, he became Governor of the Principality of Sedan and its dependencies.

In 1741, the War of the Austrian Succession broke out, and Harcourt was sent to Bavaria to fight against the Austrians and British. He participated in the Battle of Dettingen (1743) where he was wounded. In 1744 he defeated a Hungarian Pandur force on the Saverne Pass, which wanted to invade Lorraine. The Pandurs were commanded by Franz Leopold von Nádasdy and Baron Franz von der Trenck.

The next year, he fought in Flanders and distinguished himself in the Siege of Tournai (1745), the Battle of Fontenoy and the Battle of Rocoux (October 11, 1746). He led the successful Siege of Dendermonde, which was occupied on August 12, 1745.

He was made Marshal of France at Fontainebleau on October 19, 1746.

He died in Saint-Germain-en-Laye on July 10, 1750, at the age of 60, without leaving any male descendants. His brother, Louis Abraham d'Harcourt, a priest, succeeded him as the 3rd Duke of Harcourt, but he soon died on September 27, 1750. Louis was succeeded as the 4th Duke of Harcourt by an other brother, Anne Pierre d'Harcourt (1701–1784).

== Marriage and children ==
François d'Harcourt married Marguerite-Louise-Sophie de Neufville-Villeroy, daughter of Nicolas de Neufville, Duke of Villeroy, on January 14, 1716, but she died 5 months after the wedding.

He remarried on May 31, 1717, Marie-Madeleine Le Tellier de Barbezieux, daughter of Louis François Marie Le Tellier, Marquis de Barbezieux, Minister and Secretary of State for War and Marie Thérèse Delphine d'Alègre. From this last marriage came:

- Françoise-Claire d'Harcourt (1718–1751), married Emmanuel Dieudonné de Hautefort, Ambassador of King Louis XV to the Court of Austria from 1749 to 1751.
- Angélique-Adélaïde d'Harcourt (1719–1744), married Emanuel, Prince of Solre, 7th Duke of Croÿ, Grandee of Spain, Marshal of France (1718–1784).
- Gabrielle-Lydie d'Harcourt (1722–1801), married Claude Louis François Régnier de Guerchy, Ambassador to London from 1763 to 1767.
- Louis François d'Harcourt, (1728–1748), Captain of the Bodyguard, predeceased his father.
