= Jean d'Harcourt =

Jean de Harcourt (died 13 June 1452) was a French priest and bishop.

His parents were Jacques d'Harcourt, seigneur de Montgomery, and Jeanne d'Enghien. He was canon of Laon, then bishop of Amiens from 1418 and finally bishop of Tournai from 1433. His nomination to Tournai displeased Philip the Good, who held back the bishopric's revenues. The Pope gave in and instead made him bishop of Narbonne in 1436, although he did not accept that bishopric, feeling he was being forced to do so by the king of France. The inhabitants of Tournai were so supportive of de Harcourt that they tore apart the count of Estampes in the episcopal chair - he had been sent by the duke to take possession of the see.

The king of France and the duke were finally reconciled by the Treaty of Arras (1435) and in 1437 de Harcourt abandoned Tournai in favour of Narbonne. Pope Nicholas V also made him patriarch of Antioch and in 1451-1452 he also became bishop of Orléans.
