= Bernard the Dane =

Bernard the Dane is described by the tenth century ecclesiastical writer Dudo of Saint-Quentin as a 'warrior' of Rouen from 'Dacia', (Note: Bernard the Dane is a convenient widely-used standardisation of the name. Dudo calls him either 'Bernard of Rouen' (L. Bernardum Rothomagensis) or 'Bernard the Dacian' (L. Bernardum Dacigenam) where 'Dacia' refers to a diocese of eastern Scandinavia, not the province bordering the Black Sea. Dudo sometimes follows the name with militem ('knight' or 'warrior').) an ally and confidant of the first leaders of Normandy, political counsellor to Rollo's son William Longsword, and co-regent of the territory during the minority of his son and heir, Richard I of Normandy. In particular, Bernard is seen as being at the centre of events in the aftermath of the assassination of William Longsword.

== Life ==
We know extremely little about Bernard the Dane and all that we do know comes from Dudo of Saint-Quentin in his work commonly referred to as 'De moribus', the story of the lives of the earliest leaders of Normandy. He would have been alive in the middle of the tenth century. It was estimated that he was born between 880 and 904, and died around 955. He was said to have married Sphreta (Sprote) de Bourgoyne. Possible Children include Torf I (Sn.) de TOURVILLE; Mathilde de PONT-AUDEMER; Torf (Torfulus) `the Rich' (Sn.) de HARCOURT; Galeran I de MEULAN. Dudo ascribes to him great wealth and a 'beautiful wife' but doesn't name her or mention any children in the text. In fact, the section of Dudo's story that includes mentions of Bernard the Dane only spans four years from 942 to 946 CE.

In 942 CE (Note: Dudo does not provide dates but these events appear in other sources (see references) and can be dated by contextual cross-referencing.), William Longsword is assassinated, sparking a series of dramatic events during which Dudo depicts Bernard the Dane as having a significant role, not only as a military leader in Rouen, but also as co-regent of the territory whilst William's son and heir, Richard, is still in his minority. (Note: In this work there is more than one character named Bernard and Dudo sometimes fails to be clear about which Bernard he is referring to. For example, after Rollo hands over power to his son William Longsword (in 928 CE), Dudo mentions that "a certain Bernard, privy to duke William's secrets", recalls the brave deeds of his father Rollo. This may refer to either Bernard the Dane or Bernard of Senlis, a relative of William. If it is indeed Bernard the Dane then there follows a period of some fifteen years when he is absent from Dudo's story.)

Dudo recounts that, after the murder of his father, the young heir, Richard, is abducted by allies of the king (Louis IV) and taken to the royal stronghold of Laon under the guise of protecting and educating him. Then we hear of his rescue and return to Rouen where, Dudo says, he is put under the protection of Bernard the Dane.

As a result of the perceived weakness of Normandy at this point, the king and Hugh the Great both attack the province. The Normans - in the person of Bernard the Dane in Dudo's account - respond by calling on the Danish king (Harald Bluetooth) to raise an army which duly lands in Normandy and captures the king. He is then held hostage in Rouen. Negotiations follow, with Bernard playing a central role, which culminate in the release of the king in return for a renewed treaty re-asserting the Normans' right to their territory and Richard's right to its leadership.

These events had concluded by early 946 CE, after which Dudo makes no further mention of Bernard the Dane.

== Historicity ==
There is no extant contemporary source for Bernard the Dane, (Note: The 'cartularies', ecclesiastical records kept by the monasteries and churches, do not generally stretch back to this period.) despite there being two writers who were both maintaining chronicles at the time: Flodoard and Richer, both of Reims.

=== Absence from contemporary sources ===
Flodoard of Reims, maintained his 'Annals' over the period 920 to 960 CE. He would have been a young man when the treaty establishing Normandy was signed and in the midst of writing his chronicles when William was killed in 942 CE. He describes this shocking event, and those that followed it, but fails to mention Bernard the Dane either in this context or at any point in his forty year chronicle. This is surprising if the prominence ascribed by Dudo to Bernard is to be believed, especially since Flodoard is regarded as a light in the darkness of the history of this period. (In his notes to his edition of Flodoard's 'Annals', Philippe Lauer says that, but for Flodoard, "a good part of the tenth century history of France would consist only in a few scattered and discordant mentions, and in a web of legends"). (Note: The noted historian, Sir Frank Stenton also refers to the paucity of sources: "In dealing with any aspect of early Norman history it is impossible to get very far down beneath speculation to concrete fact" and "For the study of early Norman society materials are few, and many of them are untrustworthy.")

The 'Historia' by the monk Richer covers the period from 885 to 996 CE. For the earlier part of that period, that of interest in regard to Bernard, Richer relied upon and closely followed Flodoard. He doesn't mention Bernard the Dane.

=== Dudo of Saint-Quentin ===
Dudo started writing his version of events in 996 CE, over fifty years after the assassination of William Longsword. His 'De moribus' is a panegyric, part prose and part verse, written in florid and arcane language, which has been widely questioned by modern historians. Sir Frank Stenton said of it: "The panegyrical history of the early dukes written by Dudo of St. Quentin for Duke Richard II has suffered irretrievably from modern criticism." Graham Loud has described it as "a piece of extremely learned, not to say remarkably pretentious, literary fiction" and adds that most of what Dudo wrote was "either his own invention or the product of skilful plagiarisation or reworking of other events." The historian Leah Shopkow regards Bernard the Dane, specifically, as an invention of Dudo.

=== Later histories ===
In the eleventh century both William of Jumièges and Hugh of Fleury write histories of the period, mirroring Dudo for the tenth century, adding nothing of substance about Bernard the Dane or indicating other primary sources. Dudo's 'De moribus' continues to form the basis of further histories of Normandy for the period.

=== Bernard in genealogy ===
Despite Dudo suggesting nothing more than Bernard the Dane having an unnamed "beautiful wife", this hasn't stopped genealogists from creating a family for him. Notably, Gilles-André de La Roque in his 1633 work on the genealogy of the Harcourt family, ascribes a family to Bernard that is not found elsewhere. He asserts that Torf the Rich was Bernard's son through a marriage with Sphreta (Sprote) de Harcourt, thus implying that Bernard was the earliest known forebear of the houses of Beaumont and Harcourt. This has since been replicated very widely and is evident in countless online genealogies and family histories today. La Roque's 'sources' for Bernard the Dane are limited to discussions with fellow genealogists and recent manuscripts, which do not provide a source for the family he attaches to Bernard the Dane. (Note: La Roque includes some side notes and an extensive section which he calls his "Preuves" or proofs. The side note for Bernard the Dane refers only to discussions with his colleagues in 1613 and a work entitled "Chroniques de Normandie" which is described in the 'Encyclopedia of the Medieval Chronicle', as being "drawn up from the Latin chronicles of Dudo of St. Quentin, William of Jumièges, and Orderic Vitalis". The Foundation for Medieval Genealogy describes La Roque's "Preuves" as copies or summaries of other documents, which lack source references and mainly lack dates, and are unverifiable.)
