= Château du Champ de Bataille =

Château in Upper Normandy, France

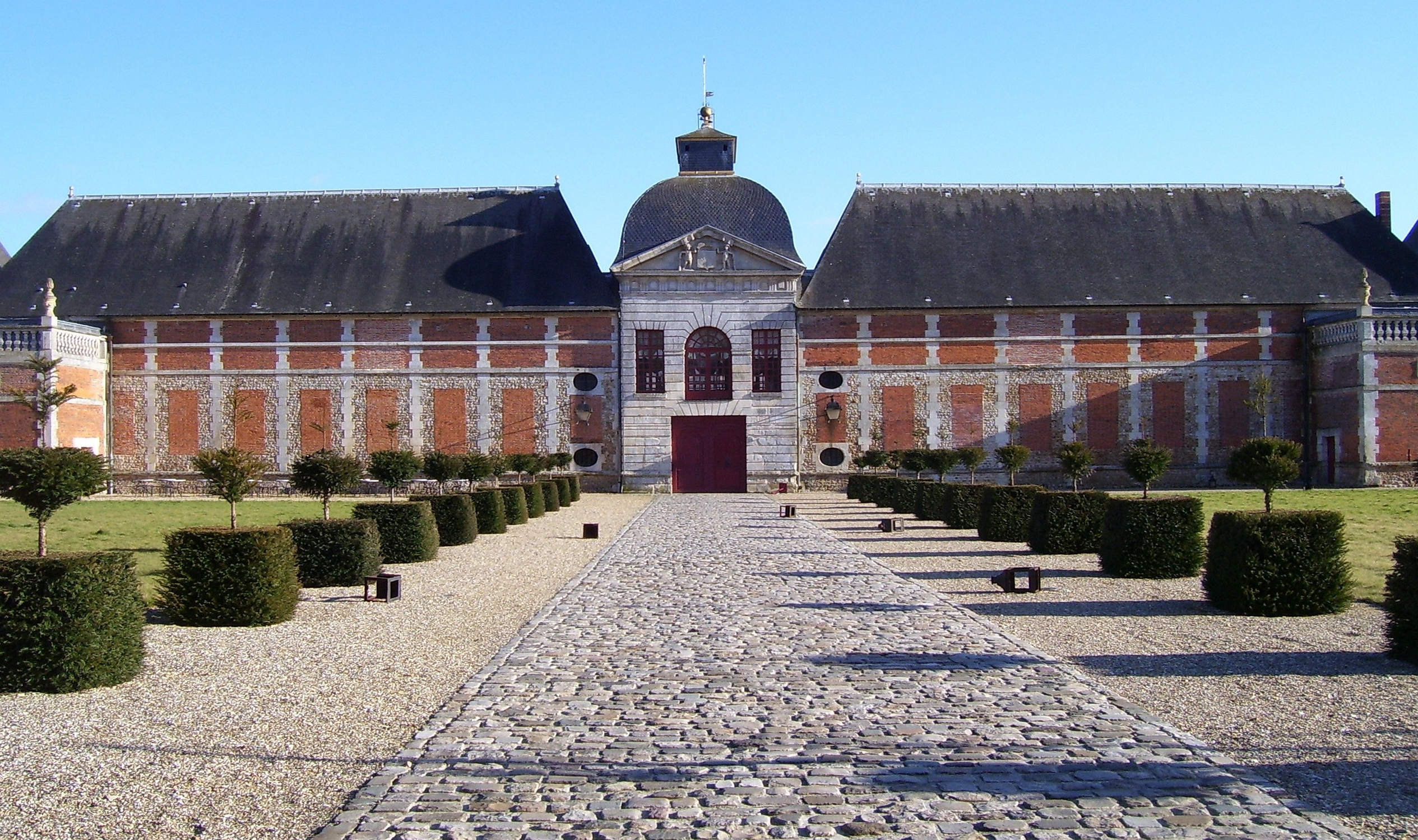
- Garden path and château entrance
- Interactive map of the Château du Champ de Bataille area

General information
- Architectural style: Baroque
- Location: Between Le Neubourg and Sainte-Opportune-du-Bosc, Eure, Upper Normandy, France
- Coordinates: 49°10′6″N 0°51′33″E
- Construction started: 1653
- Completed: 1665
- Owner: Jacques Garcia

The Château du Champ de Bataille is a château located in the Eure department of the French region of Upper Normandy. It is a Baroque château lying between the communes of Neubourg and Sainte-Opportune-du-Bosc, and in the Campagne du Neubourg, between the river Risle to the west and the river Iton to the east. It was built in the 17th century for the Maréchal de Créqui.

== History ==
In 1650, Alexandre de Créquy-Bernieulle (1628–1703) was arrested and exiled to the provinces by Cardinal Mazarin. He built the Château du Champ de Bataille between 1653 and 1665. After the arrest the château was the home of the "de Merendonque" family. During the French Revolution, the château was stormed and the furniture was sold throughout France.

It was the seat of the Dukes d'Harcourt (of the House of Harcourt) until the head of the family sold it in 1983. The Harcourt family bought it in 1754, they were forced to sell it after the French Revolution but they re-bought the Château later.

Interior designer Jacques Garcia owns the château, having purchased it in 1992.

== The gardens ==
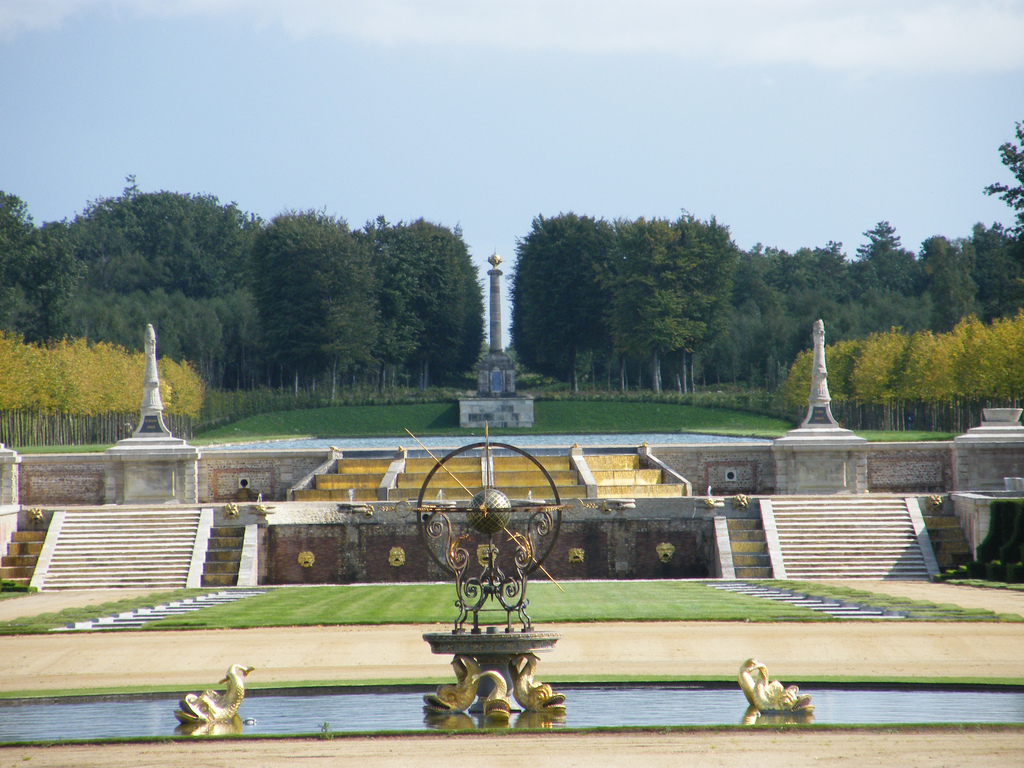
Fountains in the château gardens

The French formal garden was created from 1992 by Garcia. It was inspired by sketches of the original garden, long vanished, which showed the placement of the great terrace, the broderies and bosquets, and the proportions of the squares of Apollo and Diana. These features were scrupulously reproduced, while the new features of the garden took their "measure and tone" from the original model. (Note: See the description of the garden on the site of the Committee of Parks and Gardens of the Ministry of Culture of France.) The garden is listed by the French Ministry of Culture as one of the Notable Gardens of France.
