= François-Henri d'Harcourt =

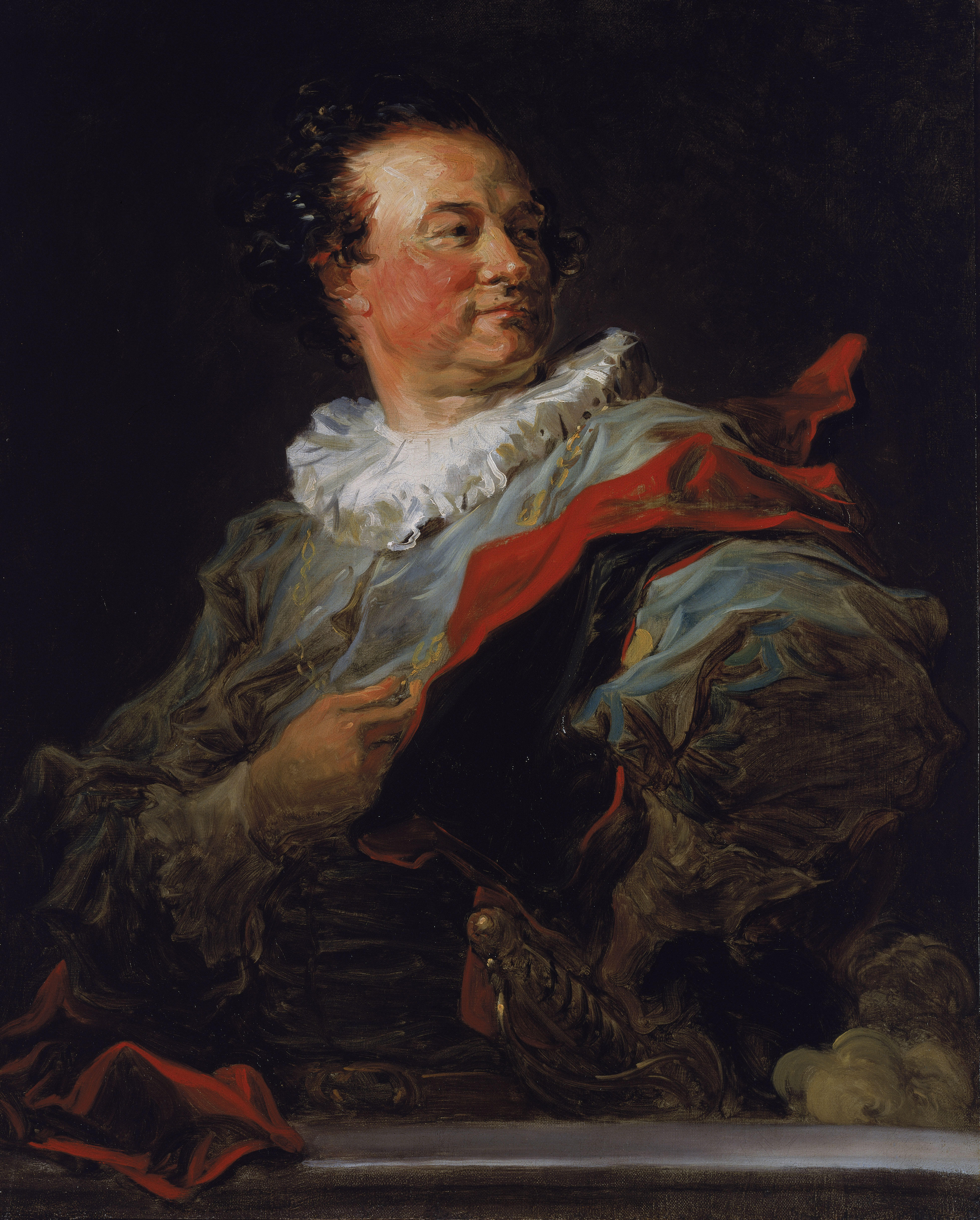
Harcourt by Fragonard (c. 1769)

François Henri d'Harcourt, 5th Duke of Harcourt (12 January 1726 – 22 July 1802) was a French general, duke and peer.

He emigrated during the French Revolution, and he became a representative of Louis XVIII to the British government (1792–1800).

== Personal life ==
D'Harcourt was born in Paris as son of Anne Pierre d'Harcourt, a Marshal of France, and Thérèse Eulalie de Beaupoil.

He married, 13 June 1752, Catherine Scholastica Aubusson, (1733–1815). Their daughter Anne (1753–1778) married Victurnien-Jean-Baptiste de Rochechouart, Duke of Mortemarts. D'Harcourt died in Staines, England, aged 76.

In his château Thury-Harcourt, he created a vast English landscape style park, one of the first in France.

== Portrait ==
On 5 December 2013, in Bonhams's salerooms in New Bond Street, London, a portrait of d'Harcourt by Jean-Honoré Fragonard, one of his Fantastical Portraits, sold for £17,106,500 sterling, setting a world-record price for the artist at auction. The previous record was £5,300,000 for a painting sold in London in 1999. The sum paid was also the highest price for an Old Master painting sold at auction anywhere in the world in 2013. Bonhams's sale of paintings and sculpture from the collection of the German philanthropist, the late Dr Gustav Rau, raised more than £19 million, with the proceeds benefiting the Foundation of the German Committee for UNICEF – for the children of the world. The painting was also previously sold for £340,000 in 1971 (equivalent to $5,127,000 in 2023), when the d'Harcourt family collection was dispersed.
