= Anne Pierre d'Harcourt =

French Royal Army officer and nobleman

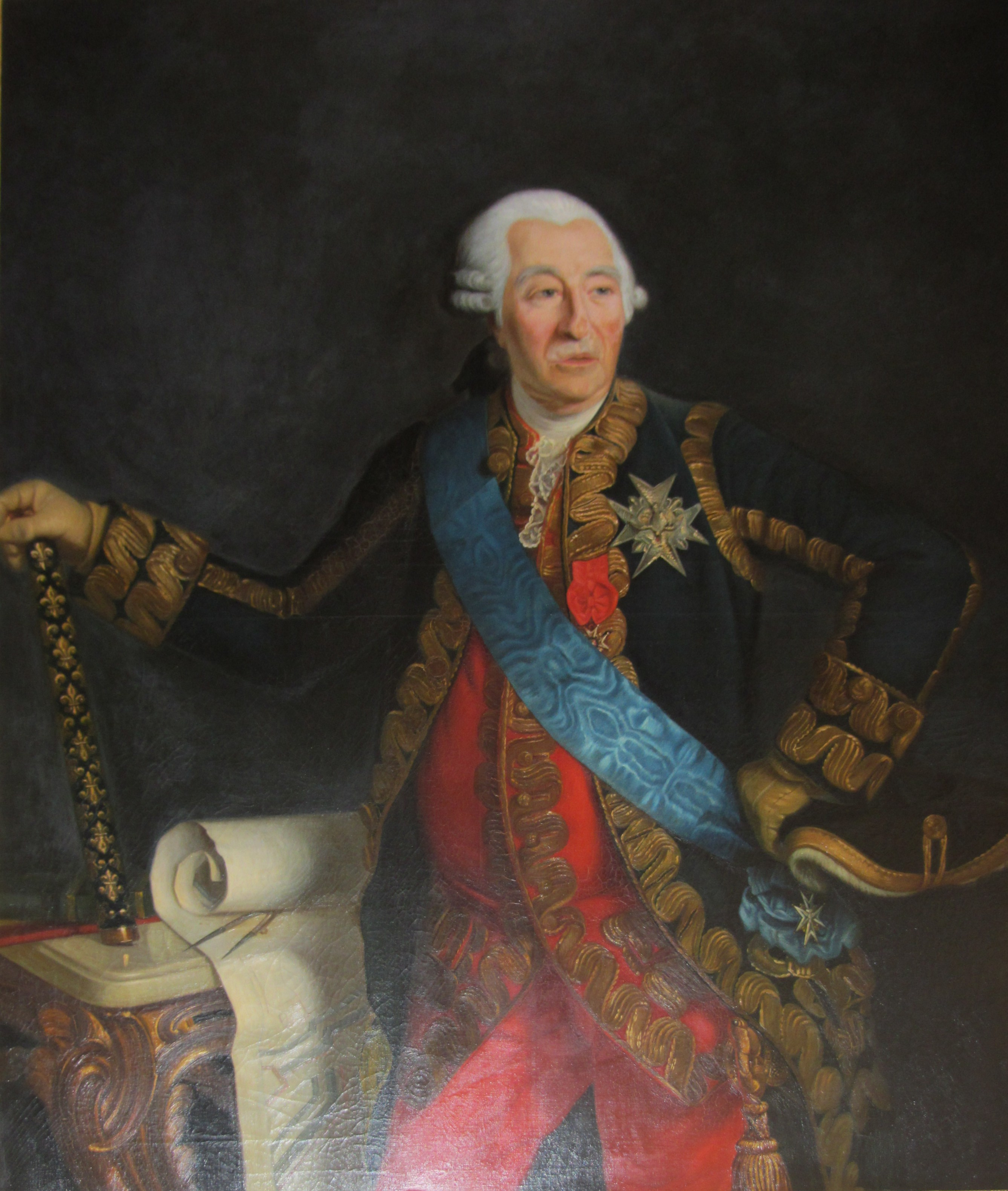
Anne Pierre d'Harcourt

Anne Pierre d'Harcourt, 4th Duke of Harcourt was a French Royal Army officer and nobleman, notable as a duke of Harcourt and the fourth marshal of France from the House of Harcourt. He was the son of Henry d'Harcourt and great-grandson of Abraham de Fabert, both marshals of France.

He was born on 2 April 1701, was made marshal of France on 24 March 1775 and died in 1784.

He married Thérèse Eulalie de Beaupoil and had 5 children, including François-Henri d'Harcourt.

Anne Pierre d'Harcourt assumed the dukedom on the death of his brother. He became lieutenant-general of Upper Normandy in 1716 and was appointed governor of the same province on 15 June 1764. He was succeeded in the dukedom by his son, François-Henri.
