= Henri d'Harcourt, 1st Duke of Harcourt =

French noble

Henri d'Harcourt
- 1st Duke of Harcourt
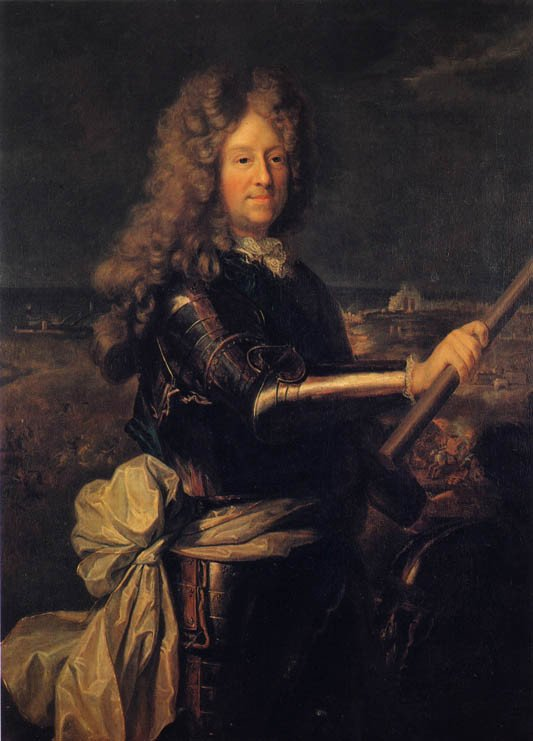
- Maréchal d'Harcourt, attributed to Hyacinthe Rigaud, c. 1697
- Born: 2 April 1654; France
- Died: 19 October 1718 (aged 64); Paris, France
- Noble family: House of Harcourt
- Spouse: Marie Anne Claude de Genlis (m. 1687)
- Father: François III d'Harcourt, Marquis of Beuvron and Harcourt
- Military career
- Allegiance: Kingdom of France
- Rank: Marshal of France
- Commands: Army of the Rhine
- Wars: Franco-Dutch War; Battle of Sinsheim; Battle of Turckheim; Siege of Cambrai; Nine Years' War; Siege of Philippsburg; Battle of Landen; War of the Spanish Succession
- Awards: Order of the Holy Spirit; Order of Saint Michael

Henri d'Harcourt, 1st Duke of Harcourt (French: [ɑ̃ʁi daʁkuʁ]; 2 April 1654 – 19 October 1718) was a French noble, created the first Duke of Harcourt and Marshal of France by king Louis XIV. The duke also acted as extraordinary ambassador to Madrid.

== Life ==
As son of François III d'Harcourt, Marquis of Beuvron and of Harcourt, he was a member of the ancient House of Harcourt that dates back to the 11th century. Aged 18, he entered in the army and participated in all the wars of his time. He was present at the Battle of Sinsheim (1674), Battle of Turckheim (1675), Siege of Cambrai (1677), Siege of Philippsburg (1688) and Battle of Neerwinden (1693). In 1695 and 1696, he commanded the Army of the Moselle as a lieutenant general.

In 1697, he was appointed extraordinary ambassador to Spain, which was in a crucial period when King Charles II of Spain died without a successor. It is unknown which role he played in the intrigues following Charles's death, but it resulted in the installation of a Bourbon on the throne of Spain. When he returned to France, the grateful Louis XIV made him a Duke in 1700 and a Marshal of France in 1703.

During the Spanish War of Succession, he commanded the Army of the Rhine in 1709, 1711, and 1712, when he suffered a stroke and was forced to retire.

== Marriage and Children ==
He married in 1687 Marie Anne Claude de Genlis, daughter of Claude Charles Brulart and Angélique de Fabert, daughter of Abraham de Fabert.

They had 11 children, including:

- François d'Harcourt (1689–1750), 2nd Duke of Harcourt and also Marshal of France.
- Louis Henri d'Harcourt (1692–1716), Count of Beuvron and Knight of the Order of the Golden Fleece.
- Louis Abraham d'Harcourt (1694–1750), 3rd Duke of Harcourt (only for 3 months).
- Anne Pierre d'Harcourt (1701–1783), 4th Duke of Harcourt and also Marshal of France. Had issue.
