= Brionne =

French commune

- Commune
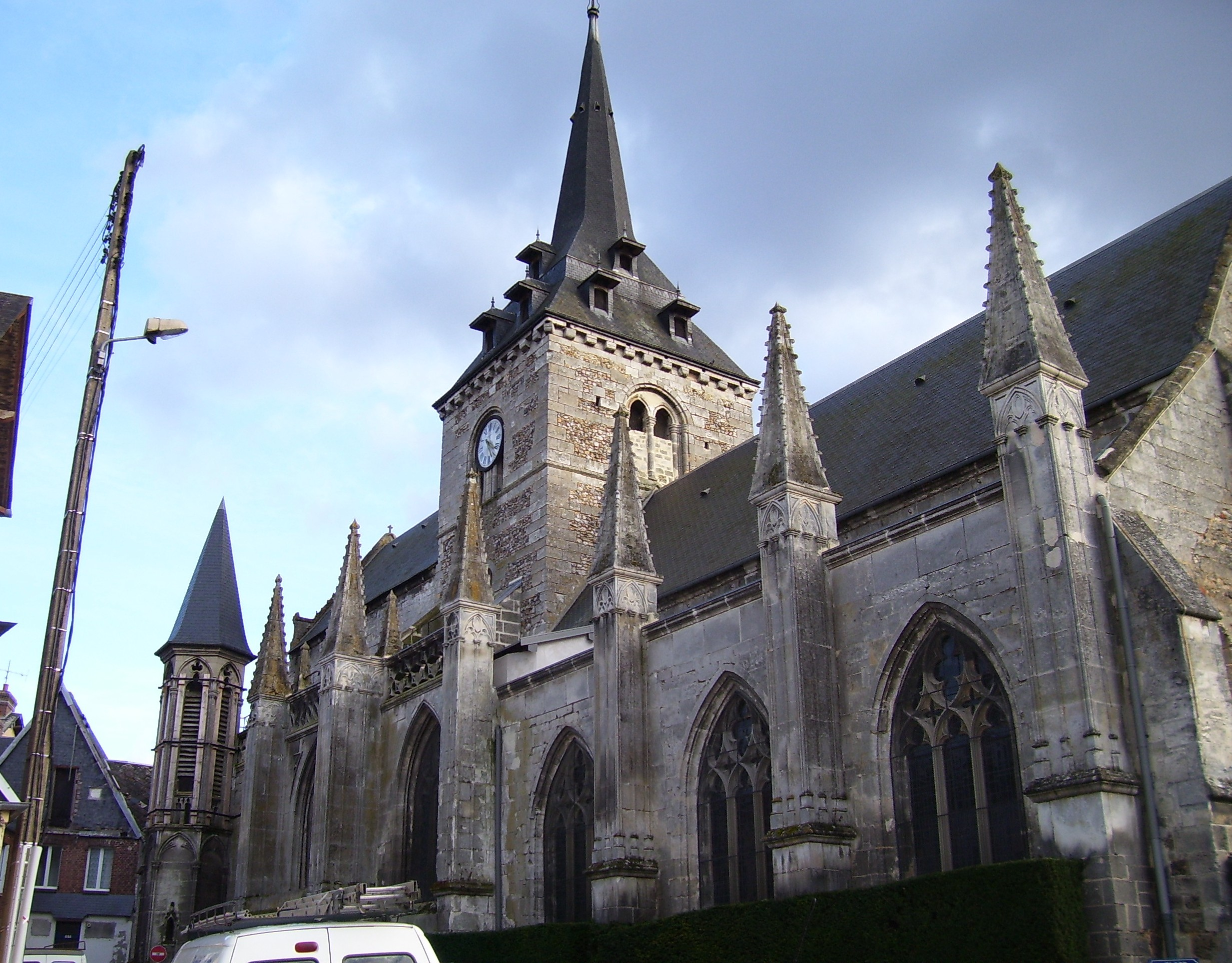
- The church in Brionne

- Coat of arms
- Location of Brionne
- Location within France Location within Normandy
- Coordinates: 49°11′44″N 0°43′16″E
- Country: France
- Region: Normandy
- Department: Eure
- Arrondissement: Bernay
- Canton: Brionne

Government
  - Mayor (2020–2026): Valéry Beuriot
- Area^{1}: 16.77 km^{2} (6.47 sq mi)
- Highest elevation: 145 m (476 ft)
- Lowest elevation: 47 m (154 ft)
- Population (2023): 4,185
  - Density: 249.6/km^{2} (646.3/sq mi)
- Time zone: UTC+01:00 (CET)
  - Summer (DST): UTC+02:00 (CEST)
- INSEE/Postal code: 27116 /27800
- ^{1} French Land Register data, which excludes lakes, ponds, glaciers > 1 km^{2} (0.386 sq mi or 247 acres) and river estuaries.

Brionne (French pronunciation: [bʁijɔn]) is a commune in the Eure department. Brionne is in the region of Normandy of northern France.

== Geography ==
The commune along with another 69 communes shares part of a 4,747 hectare, Natura 2000 conservation area, called Risle, Guiel, Charentonne.

== Population history ==
Historical population
Year	Pop.	±% p.a.
1968	4,348	—
1975	4,808	+1.45%
1982	4,951	+0.42%
1990	4,408	−1.44%
1999	4,449	+0.10%
2007	4,338	−0.32%
2012	4,275	−0.29%
2017	4,278	+0.01%
2023	4,185	−0.37%
Source: INSEE

== Notable sites and buildings ==
The keep of Brionne was built in the 11th century A.D. and was destroyed in the 18th century. The keep was of a Norman variety because of its square shape.

The church of Saint Martin includes a tower that uses Romanesque and Gothic elements. The ground-level floor of the church is of a Romanesque style while the first-story floor is of a Gothic style. The church's door was made in the 18th century A.D.. The church's altar was designed by Guillaume de la Tremblaye in 1694 A.D.. The altar was originally intended to be used in the Chapel of the Bec Abbey.

The cemetery and the church of Saint Denis were used for religious purposes until 1790 A.D.. The cemetery was used until both the church and the cemetery were damaged by bombs in The 2nd World War (1944). The church was later partially restored but the cemetery ceased to exist. The church now does serve as a gymnasium.

== See also ==
- Communes of the Eure department
