= Armand Chapelle de Jumilhac, 7th Duke of Richelieu =

French aristocrat (1847–1880)

Armand Chapelle de Jumilhac
- 7th Duke of Richelieu; 7th Marquis of Jumilhac
- Full name: Marie Odet Richard Armand Chapelle de Jumilhac
- Born: 15 November 1847; Paris, France
- Died: 28 June 1880 (aged 32); Athens, Greece
- Noble family: Chapelle de Jumilhac
- Spouse: Alice Heine (m. 1875; died 1880)
- Issue: Armand Chapelle de Jumilhac; Odile Chapelle de Jumilhac
- Father: Armand Henri Marie Marcel Chapelle de Jumilhac
- Mother: Marie Claire Auguste Hélène de Pouget

Marie Odet Richard Armand Chapelle de Jumilhac, 7th Duke of Richelieu (15 November 1847 – 28 June 1880), was a French aristocrat.

== Early life ==
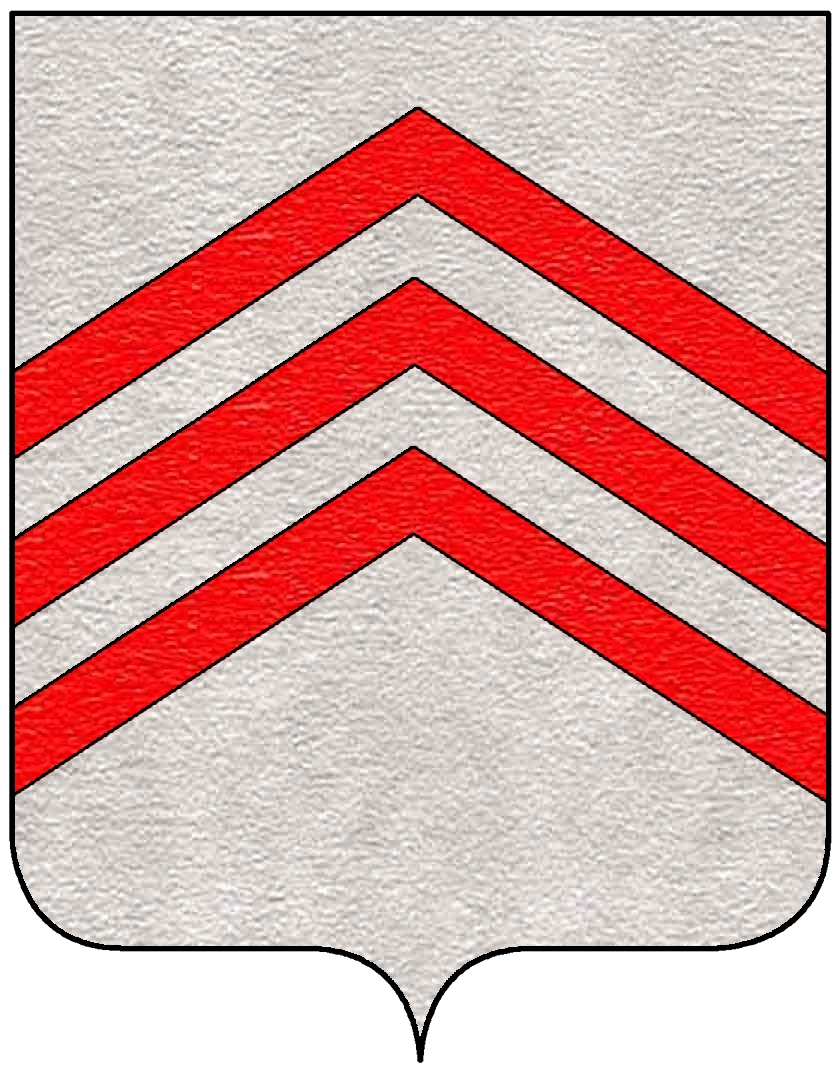
Arms of the dukes of the Chapelle de Jumilhac family

Chapelle de Jumilhac was born in Paris on 15 November 1847. He was the only son of Armand Henri Marie Marcel Chapelle de Jumilhac, Marquis of Jumilhac (1808–1862), and Marie Claire Auguste Hélène de Pouget de Nadaillac (1826–1881). His family's seat was the Château de Jumilhac.

His paternal grandparents were Antoine Pierre de Chapelle, 5th Marquis of Jumilhac, and Armande Simplicie Gabrielle de Vignerot du Plessis (daughter of Antoine de Vignerot du Plessis, 4th Duke of Richelieu). His paternal grandmother's elder half-brother was Armand Emmanuel de Vignerot du Plessis, 5th Duke of Richelieu. His maternal grandparents were Sigismond du Pouget, Marquis of Nadaillac, and Catherine Mitchell. His maternal uncle was the prominent French anthropologist and palaeontologist, Jean-François-Albert du Pouget, Marquis of Nadaillac.

== Career ==
In 1862, upon the death of his father, he became the Marquis of Jumilhac. In 1879, upon the death of his paternal uncle, Armand François Odet Chapelle de Jumilhac, he succeeded as the 6th Duke of Richelieu. His father-in-law, Michel Heine, paid to restore what remained of the Château de Richelieu and domaine. He did not retain the title long as he died the following year. His son then succeeded to the title. In 1930, his son donated the Château Park to the Universities of Paris and Sorbonne in memory of their foundation by the first Duke.

== Personal life ==
On 27 February 1875 in Paris, Chapelle de Jumilhac was married to American-born heiress Alice Heine (1858–1925), a daughter of Amélie Marie Céleste Miltenberger and Michel Heine, a scion of a prominent German-rooted Berlin and Paris banking Jewish family. Her father and uncle, Armand Heine, were cousins of poet Heinrich Heine and of journalist and press publisher Baron Gustav Heine von Geldern. Together, they were the parents of:

- Marie Odet Jean Armand Chapelle de Jumilhac (1875–1952), who married the American Elinor Douglas Wise, daughter of Admiral Frederick May Wise, in 1913.
- Odile Marie Auguste Septimanie Chapelle de Jumilhac (1879–1974), who married Count Gabriel de La Rochefoucauld, a grandson of Count Hippolyte de La Rochefoucauld (himself the youngest son of François de La Rochefoucauld, 8th Duke of La Rochefoucauld), in 1905.

The Duke died, aged only 32, on 28 June 1880 while in Athens, Greece. After his death, his widow remarried to the reigning Prince Albert I of Monaco in 1889, becoming the Princess consort of Monaco. She died in Paris in 1925. The dukedom of Richelieu became extinct in 1952 upon the death of their son.

=== Descendants ===
Through his daughter Odile, he was posthumously a grandfather of Countess Anne Alice Elisabeth Amélie de La Rochefoucauld (1906–1980), who married twice, to Armand Anne Henri Joseph de Gontaut-Biron and to Marquis Jean de Amodio, but had no issue.

French nobility
Preceded by Odet Chapelle de Jumilhac	Duke of Richelieu; 1879–1880	Succeeded by Armand Chapelle de Jumilhac
