= Antoine Pierre de Chapelle, 5th Marquis of Jumilhac =

Antoine Pierre Joseph de Chapelle Marquis of Jumilhac
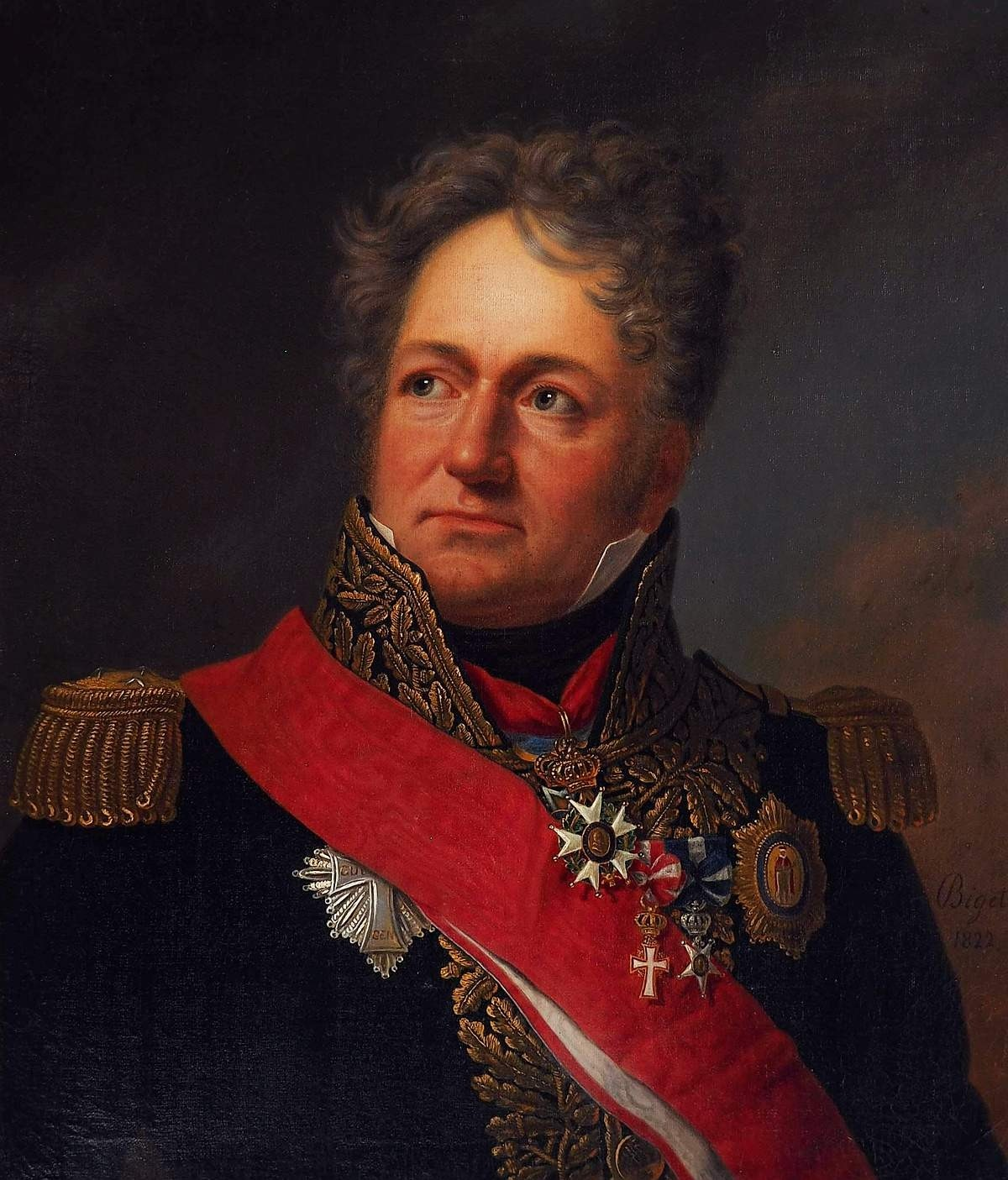
- The Marquis of Jumilhac, by Bernard Biget, 1822
- Born: 24 August 1764; Paris, France
- Died: 19 February 1826 (aged 61); Lille, France
- Spouse: Simplicie de Vignerot du Plessis (m. 1803; died 1826)
- Military career
- Allegiance: Kingdom of France; Armée des Émigrés; French First Republic; Kingdom of France
- Branch: French Army
- Rank: Lieutenant General
- Conflicts: • Anglo-French War • Russian campaign
- Awards: • Legion of Honour • Order of Saint Louis • Order of Saint Henry (Saxony) • Order of the Dannebrog (Danish)

Antoine Pierre Joseph de Chapelle, 5th Marquis of Jumilhac (31 August 1764 – 19 February 1826), was a French general.

== Early life ==
Chapelle was born on 31 August 1764 in Paris. He was the eldest son of Lieutenant General Pierre Marie de Chapelle, 4th Marquis of Jumilhac (1735–1798), and Françoise Catherine Pourcheresse d'Estrabonne (1740–1815). Among his siblings were Countess Catherine Victoire Chapelle de Jumilhac (wife of Marc Pierre Le Cat d'Hervilly, Viscount of Hervilly-Canisy) and Count Joseph Léon Marie Chapelle de Jumilhac (who married Antoinette Nicole Joséphine Parat de Chalandray).

His paternal grandparents were Françoise Armande de Menou de Charnizay and Pierre Joseph de Chapelle, 3rd Marquis of Jumilhac, Lieutenant General of the King's Armies and Lieutenant of the King in Guyenne. His maternal grandparents were Antoinette Petit de Marivats and Jean Jacques Pourcheresse d'Estrabonne, Baron d'Estrabonne, advisor to the parliament of Franche-Comté.

== Career ==
At just thirteen years old, he entered military service as second lieutenant in the King's Infantry Regiment on 31 August 1777. He embarked in Brest in 1782, with the Régiment de Rouergue, for Cádiz, to join the Naval Army of the Count of Estaing during the Anglo-French War. He was assigned to the staff of the Land Army under the orders of Gilbert du Motier, Marquis de Lafayette. After having drawn up the camp of the vanguard division at Santa-Maria, he returned to France at the Peace of Paris in 1783.

In 1784, he was appointed captain in the Régiment du Dauphin Dragons, and took four years to visit the principal courts of Europe. In 1788, he was appointed second major of the colonel-general of Régiment du Hussars, and he studied thoroughly under the advice of his uncle, the Marquis du Mesnil, a well-respected cavalry officer.

=== French revolution ===
In 1791, he was appointed lieutenant-colonel in the guard of King Louis XVI. After the events of 10 August 1792, he was dismissed with the rest of the guard and arrested at Le Havre on the orders of the Paris Commune. Restored to freedom, he went to England, and entered the British service in the Régiment du Hervilly (known as the Régiment Royal-Louis), he was made Captain Major of the Regiment and was part of the Quiberon expedition. On 6 July 1795, he was wounded by two gunshots, one in the left arm and the other through his body. During the defeat of this expeditionary force and the Armée des Émigrés, he only escaped death by throwing himself into the water to swim to the English ships. The Count of Artois (who later became King Charles X) decorated him with the Knight's Cross of the Order of Saint Louis.

Upon his father's death in Paris in January 1798, he succeeded as the 5th Marquis of Jumilhac and inherited his family's Château de Jumilhac.

=== Napoleonic era ===
He returned to France after Coup of 18 Brumaire in November 1799, and spent the next eight years at his rural estate, where he set up an experimental farm. After a fire destroyed the main building on his farm, he was forced to return to a military career. In 1808, he joined the Portuguese Legion as a major general, then in the service of France. In 1811, he was appointed Chief of Staff of the III Cavalry Corps of the Grande Armée, and in this capacity fought in the Russian campaign. He was named a Knight of the Legion of Honour in Moscow on 11 October 1812. Participating in the retreat from Russia, he was at the Battle of Maloyaroslavets on 24 October 1812, and he is one of the last to leave this position. He arrived in January 1813, at Głogów sur l'Oder, with the remains of his Army Corps, whose cantonment he traces.

At the start of the 1813 campaign, he was chief of staff of the I Cavalry Corps under General Victor de Fay de La Tour-Maubourg, and took part in the Battle of Lützen on 2 May 1813. He was promoted to brigadier general on 18 August 1813, and was tasked with organizing a Cavalry Brigade in Leipzig with elements coming from France. He arrived at Mainz on 1 November 1813, which was under the command of General Charles Antoine Morand, and was given command of an infantry brigade on 1 January 1814 by Morand.

=== Bourbon Restoration ===
After the return of King Louis XVIII, and the evacuation of Mainz, he went to Paris, where the King rewarded him for his former services by naming him general of division on 6 March 1815 during the Bourbon Restoration. On 16 March 1815, he was further named in command of the 16th Military Division in the Nord department. The division was not used during the Hundred Days.

During the Second Restoration, Marshal Laurent de Gouvion Saint-Cyr, Minister of War, placed him at the head of the Cavalry inspectors. At the end of 1815, he resumed command of the 16th Military Division, and carried out the task entrusted to him in these times of occupation to the best of his ability. His conduct during the stay of foreign troops earned him testimonies of consideration and satisfaction from the allied sovereigns.

== Personal life ==
In c. 1803, he married Armande Simplicie Gabrielle de Vignerot du Plessis (1778–1840), a daughter of Antoine de Vignerot du Plessis, 4th Duke of Richelieu and Peer of France, and, his second wife, Marie Antoinette de Galiffet. She was the younger half-sister of Armand Emmanuel de Vignerot du Plessis, 5th Duke of Richelieu, last of his name and President of the Council under King Louis XVIII. Together, they had two children:

- Armand-François-Odet Chapelle de Jumilhac (1804–1879), who succeeded his uncle as 6th Duke of Richelieu and Peer of France; he died unmarried.
- Louis-Armand Chapelle de Jumilhac (1808–1862), a general councillor of Sarthe; he married Marie Claire Auguste Hélène de Pouget de Nadaillac (1826–1881), daughter of Sigismond du Pouget, Marquis of Nadaillac, in 1845.

The Marquis died on 19 February 1826 in Lille. His widow died in Rome on 20 March 1840.

=== Descendants ===
Through his younger son, he was grandfather of Armand Chapelle de Jumilhac, 7th Duke of Richelieu, who married heiress Alice Heine in 1875. After his death, she remarried to the reigning Prince Albert I of Monaco in 1889.

French nobility
Preceded by Pierre Marie de Chapelle de Jumilhac	Marquis of Jumilhac; 1798–1826	Succeeded by Odet Chapelle de Jumilhac
