= 7th Hussar Regiment (France) =

- Flag of the 7th Hussar Regiment
- Active: 1792 – 1815; 1840 – 1928; 1956 – 1959
- Country: France
- Branch: French Army
- Type: Cavalry
- Size: Regiment

The 7th Hussar Regiment (French: 7e régiment de hussards) was a regiment of hussars in the French Army.

== The Revolutionary Wars ==
First established as the 8th Hussar Regiment on 23 November 1792, it entered the French Revolutionary Army as the Hussards de Lamothe. The unit was promoted to 7th Hussar Regiment on 4 June 1793 following the defection of the 4th Hussar Regiment to the counter revolutionary Armée des Émigrés.

== The Napoleonic Wars ==
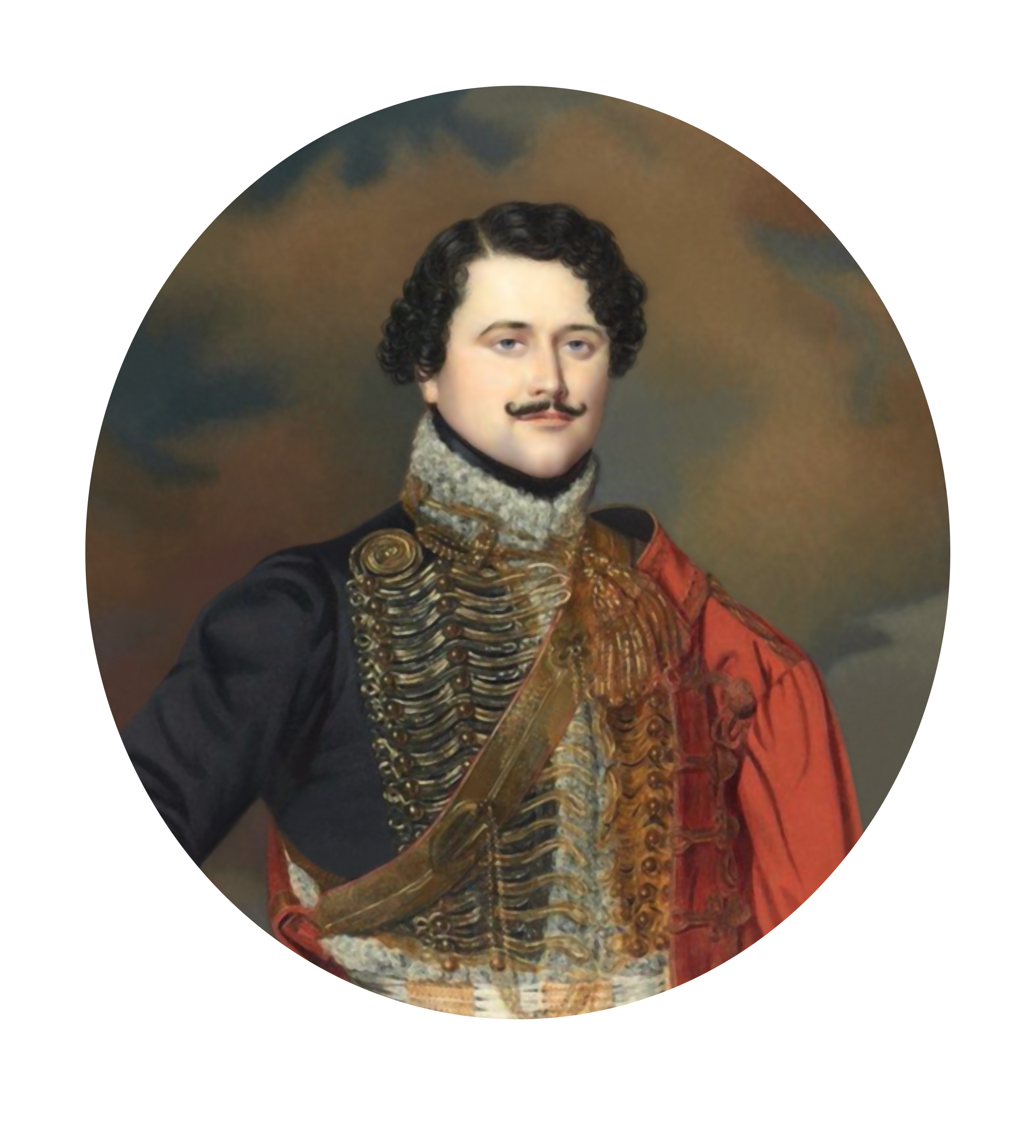
Colonel Marbot, commander of the 7th Hussar Regiment.

During the first reign of Napoleon the regiment would earn much fame and recognition. It was part of General Antoine Lasalle’s Hellish Brigade alongside the 5th Hussar Regiment, earning much respect for bravery and performance in battle, eventually winning over 5 battle honors, but their rise to prominence was slowed when Lasalle was killed at Wagram in 1809.

In 1814 it was renamed the Régiment de hussards d'Orléans and on the Bourbon Restoration it took the name Colonel-général des hussards, briefly reverting to 7th Hussar Regiment during the Hundred Days before being disbanded in November 1815. The 7th Hussars had several notable commanders including Édouard de Colbert-Chabanais, Marcellin Marbot (during the Hundred Days) and Hercule Corbineau. Future cavalry generals Louis Bro (1781–1844) and Antoine Fortuné Brack (1807–1813) also served with the regiment.

== The 19th Century ==
In 1840 the cavalry unit was re-formed as the 7th Hussar Regiment out of elements of the 4th, 5th, 6th and 12th Mounted Chasseur Regiments and of the 5th Hussar Regiment.

It was finally disbanded in 1928.

== The Algerian War ==
It was briefly re-formed as the 7th Hussar Regiment for the Algerian War between 1956 and 1959.

== Commanders ==
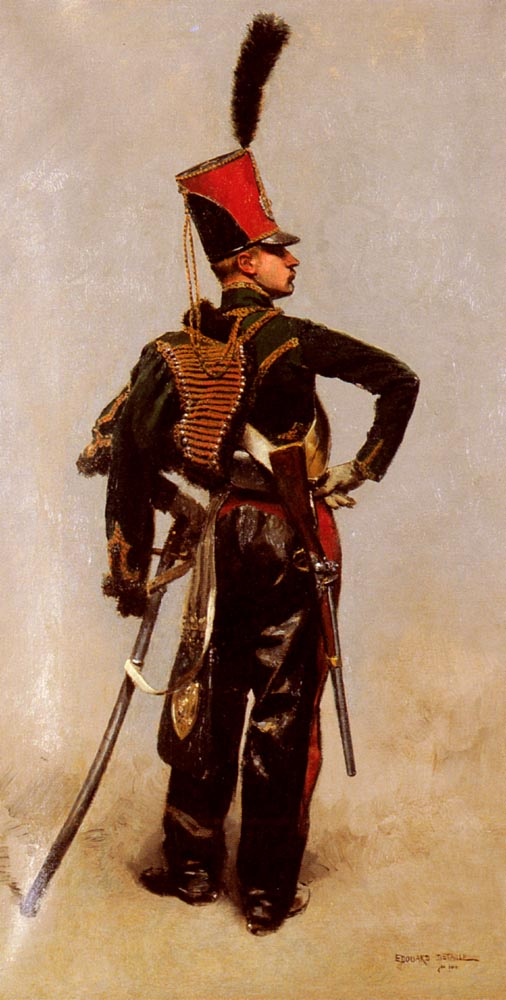
A hussar of the 7th Hussar Regiment during the late Napoleonic era.

- 1792: Colonel Lamothe
- 1794: Chef de Brigade Van Marisy
- 1797: Chef de Brigade Champeaux
- 1803: Colonel Rapp
- 1803: Colonel Marx
- 1807: Colonel Colbert-Chabanais
- 1809: Colonel Domon
- 1809: Colonel de Custines
- 1810: Colonel Eulner
- 1814: Colonel Marbot
- 1840: Colonel de Grouchy
- 1847: Colonel Grenier
- 1857: Colonel Fénis de Lacombe
- 1865: Colonel Chaussée
- 1872: Colonel prince de Bauffremont
- 1876: Colonel Des Roys
- 1876: Colonel Durdilly
- 1878: Colonel Bruneau
- 1884: Colonel Massiet
- 1891: Colonel Mulotte
- 1894: Colonel de Vergennes
- 1896: Colonel Buffet
- 1914: Colonel Lesieur-Desbrières
- 1 November 1914: Colonel Simon
- 12 October 1915 – 27 March 1917: Colonel Jouinot-Gambetta
- 1917: Colonel Langlois
- 1918: Colonel Clorus
