= Alice Heine =

Princess of Monaco from 1889 to 1922

- Duchess of Richelieu
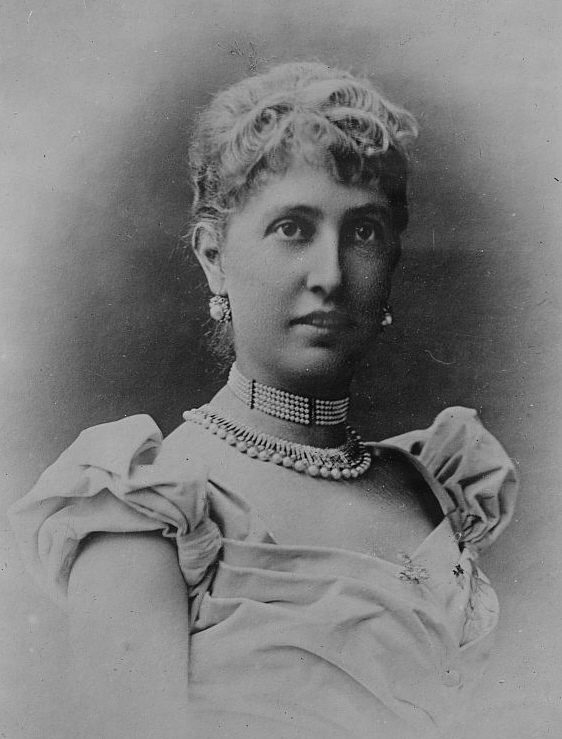
- Princess Alice c. 1890

Princess consort of Monaco
- Tenure: 30 October 1889 – 26 June 1922
- Born: Marie Alice Heine; 10 February 1857; New Orleans, Louisiana, U.S.
- Died: 22 December 1925 (aged 68); Paris, France
- Burial: Père Lachaise Cemetery
- Spouse: Armand de Jumilhac, 7th Duke of Richelieu (m. 1875; died 1880) Albert I, Prince of Monaco (m. 1889; died 1922)
- Issue: Armand de Jumilhac, 8th Duke of Richelieu; Odile, Princess de La Rochefoucauld-Montbel
- Father: Michel Heine
- Mother: Marie Amélie Miltenberger

Marie Alice Heine (10 February 1857 – 22 December 1925) was an American-born Princess of Monaco, by marriage to Prince Albert I of Monaco. Marcel Proust used her as a model for the Princesse de Luxembourg in his novel, In Search of Lost Time. Her first husband was the Duke of Richelieu, and one of the titles of her second husband was Duke of Mazarin; she was thus unique in bearing the titles of both Cardinal Richelieu and Cardinal Mazarin.

== Early life ==
Marie Alice Heine was born at 910 Rue Royale, in the French Quarter of New Orleans, Louisiana. Her French father, Michel Heine, was a scion of a prominent German-rooted Berlin and Paris banking Jewish family. His brother was Armand Heine, and both were cousins of poet Heinrich Heine and of journalist and press publisher Gustav Heine, later Baron Heine von Geldern. Michel was born in Bordeaux, France, and moved to New Orleans in 1843, and become a successful financier and real-estate developer. Heine's mother was Marie Amélie Céleste Miltenberger, daughter of Joseph Alphonse Miltenberger, an architect and cast-iron importer by trade of French Alsatian descent, and his Creole wife, Marie Céleste Dorfeville. Her family built three interconnected Miltenberger mansions on Rue Royale. She had two younger brothers, Paul Henri and Isaac Georges.

The American Civil War sent the family back to France, where the teenaged Alice's youth and beauty, and her family's wealth, made a great impression in Parisian society. A & M Heine, her father's firm, helped finance Napoleon III's war with Prussia.

Michel and Amélie became regulars in the court of Napoleon III, who, along with the Empress Eugénie, became godparents to the New Orleans-born Heine.

== Personal life ==
She married her first husband, Marie Odet Armand Aimable Chapelle de Jumilhac, Marquis of Jumilhac then 7th Duke of Richelieu and Duke of Aiguillon, in Paris on February 27, 1875. They had one son and one daughter:

- Marie Odet Jean Armand Chapelle de Jumilhac (1875–1952), who became the 8th and last Duke of Richelieu, as well as the Duke of Aiguillon and Marquis of Jumilhac, upon the death of his father in Athens on June 28, 1880. In 1913, he married Eleanor Douglas Wise (1890–1972) of Maryland, United States, daughter of John Sergeant Wise. Without issue.
- Odile Marie Auguste Septimanie Chapelle de Jumilhac (1879–1974), who in 1905 married Gabriel Marie François Hippolyte Ferri Eugène de La Rochefoucauld (1875–1942), becoming the Countess de La Rochefoucauld and later on June 22, 1909, Princess de La Rochefoucauld Kingdom of Bavaria (cousin of the Prince de La Rochefoucauld-Montbel). They had a daughter, Anne Alice Elisabeth Amélie de La Rochefoucauld (1906–1980), who married twice and had no issue.

The Duke died, aged only 32, on 28 June 1880 while in Athens, Greece.

=== Princess consort of Monaco ===
Heine first met Albert, Hereditary Prince of Monaco, in Madeira in 1879. At the time, Albert was still in an unhappy marriage with Lady Mary Victoria Douglas-Hamilton. Albert's first marriage was eventually annulled by the Church on January 3, 1880, and he and Alice began a relationship soon thereafter. Alice married Albert on October 30, 1889, shortly after his accession. According to Thomas Fouilleron, director of the Monaco Palace Archives, "Prince Albert I was deeply in love with her. It is one of the very first love marriages of the Principality".

Albert was interested in oceanography and was often on sea expeditions. While he was away, Heine took a greater interest in the Monegasque opera season. She "set about bringing class and distinction to a country financed by the casino at Monte Carlo", and devoted her energies to making Monaco one of Europe's great cultural centers with its opera, theatre and the ballet under the direction of the famed Russian impresario, Sergei Diaghilev. Her affair with singer-composer Isidore de Lara resulted in Prince Albert slapping her in view of an audience at the Opéra de Monte-Carlo.

Alice and Prince Albert I separated judicially on May 30, 1902 (Monaco), and June 3, 1902 (France), but remained married. Upon the prince's death 20 years later, Alice became the Dowager Princess of Monaco. She did not remarry.

== Legacy ==
Her former home in New Orleans is one of the most photographed buildings in the French Quarter. Today, The Royal Courtyard Bistro & Bar, Nola Rock Company and Frank Relle Photography all occupy this mansion.

Monegasque royalty
| Vacant Title last held by Antoinette de Mérode | Princess consort of Monaco; 1889–1922 | Vacant Title next held by Ghislaine Dommanget |
