= Louis-Victor-Léon de Rochechouart =

French general of House of Rochechouart

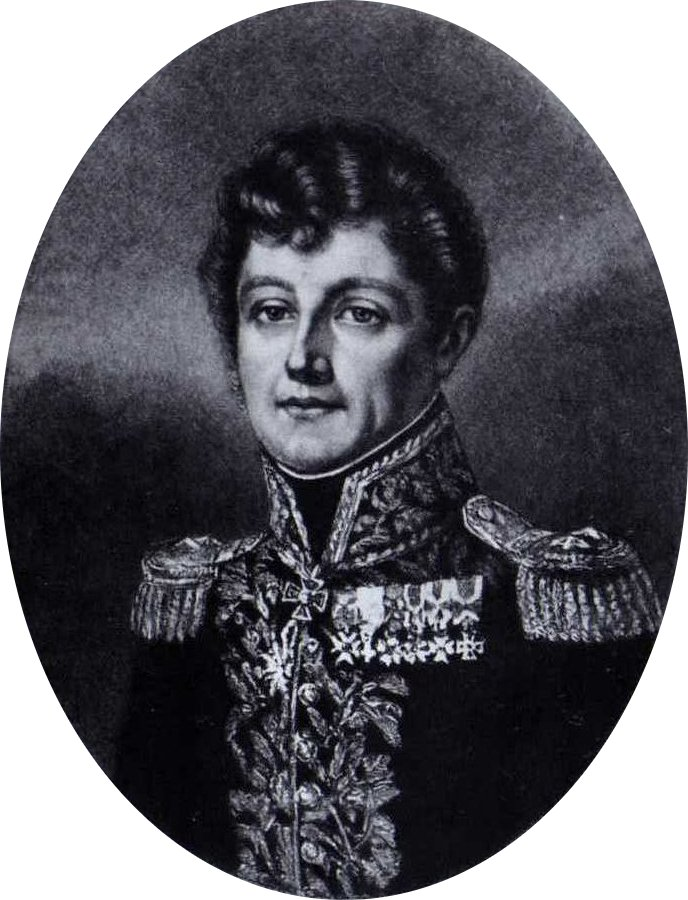

Military governor of Paris
- In office 16 October 1815 – 1821

Personal details
- Born: 14 September 1788 Paris
- Died: 1858 (aged 69–70) Jumilhac-le-Grand
- Spouse: Elisabeth Ouvrard (after 1821)
- Children: 4
- Occupation: Chef d'Etat major du ministère de la Guerre
- Awards: Commandeur de la Légion d'honneur Order of the Sword

Military service
- Allegiance: Kingdom of France, Imperial Russia, Kingdom of France
- Rank: Maréchal de camp
- Battles/wars: War of the Oranges; Napoleonic Wars; Battle of Berezina; Battle of Leipzig; Battle of Brienne; Battle of Paris

Louis-Victor-Léon de Rochechouart (14 September 1788, in Paris – 1858, in Jumilhac-le-Grand) was a French general of the House of Rochechouart fighting in the Royalist, Imperial Russian and Bourbon armies of the Napoleonic Wars.

== Life ==
=== A peripatetic childhood ===
The son of Jules de Rochechouart and Elisabeth-Armide Durey de Morsan, Louis-Victor-Léon de Rochechouart was born in Paris on 14 September 1788, only a few months before the outbreak of the French Revolution. A younger brother and thus likely destined for a career in the church, he had to flee Paris in 1794 (aged 6) due to his mother's activities in attempting to arrange for the escape of queen Marie Antoinette. Pursued by gendarmes come to arrest her, she, Louis-Victor-Léon and his brother Louis managed to escape, though his 10-year-old sister Cornélie was not so lucky - chased by the authorities, and on her own, she died of exhaustion after 3 days wandering Paris. Forced to leave France, the countess of Rochechouart left her two young sons in a house in Caen owned by a couple who exploited the situation. Housed in terrible conditions and deprived of food, the two brothers became the couple's servants. After a year they were found by a relative and freed from service. They reached Fribourg in Switzerland in 1796, where they hoped their still-exiled mother would join them but she was prevented from doing so. Thus the two brothers were generously housed by a citizen of that town until revolutionary French troops entered it in 1798 and forced them to flee once more. They finally caught up with their mother in Antwerp, before moving on with her to Rotterdam, London and Hamburg. Her implication in plots to restore the monarchy lost her her fortune, brought her many political problems and leave several refuge countries. Without a sou, she and her two children finally took refuge in Germany, where they were forced to make and sell bags to survive. He later wrote of this period "This kind of life gave me good sad reflections. Misery is a terrible thing. Nobody can get a full idea of it who has not suffered it himself. This evil can happen to anyone, imprison anyone." Aged 11, Louis-Victor-Léon de Rochechouart thus decided to embark for Hamburg to join the émigré regiment commanded by his uncle the duke of Mortemart and intended for Portugal. After many adventures, leading him through the Netherlands, England and Spain, he finally arrived in Lisbon in 1800.

=== In the émigré army ===
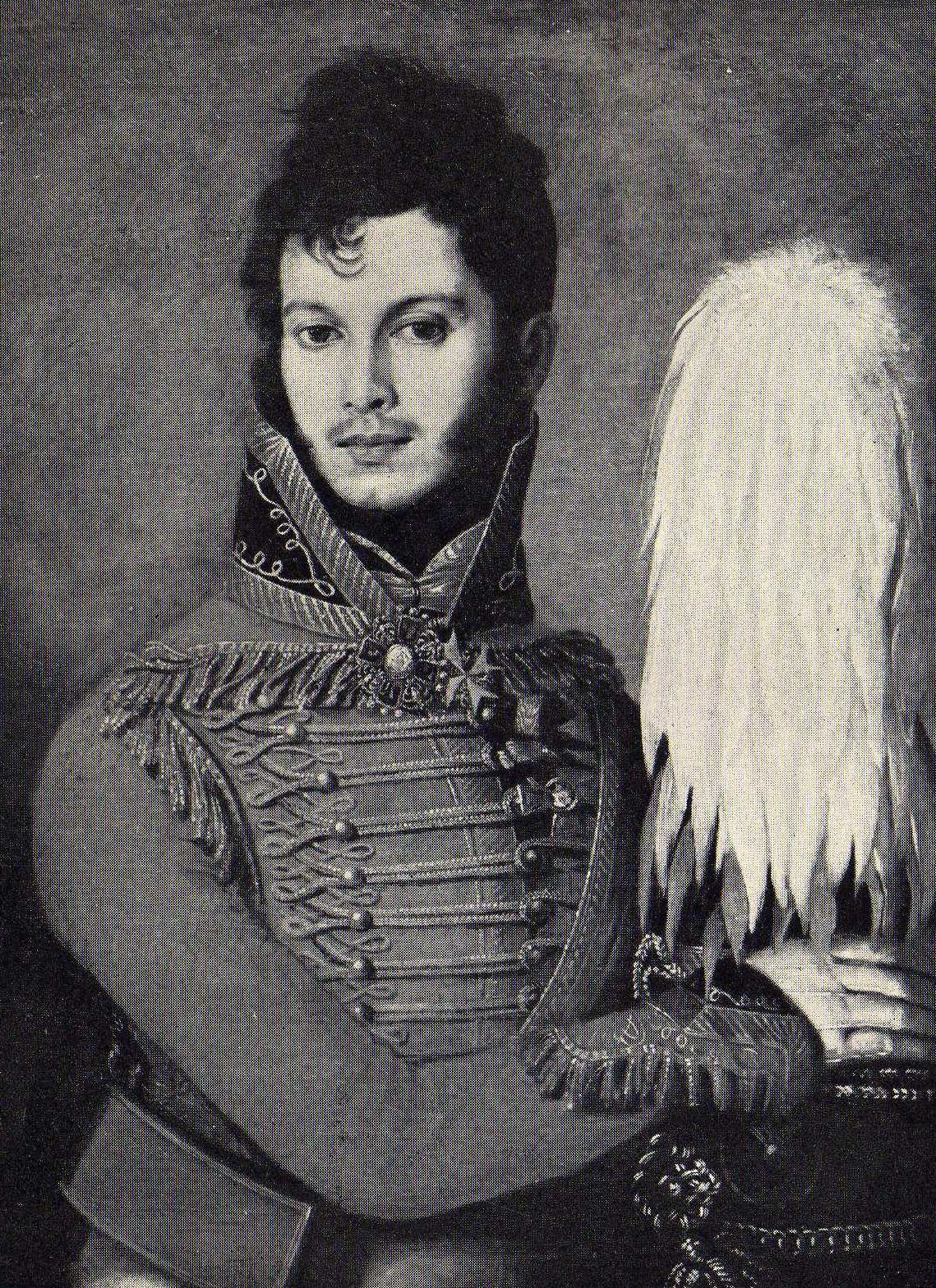
The comte de Rochechouart, during his service in the Russian Army

Aged 12, Louis-Victor-Léon de Rochechouart joined the régiment de Mortemart, one of the émigré regiments raised after the rout of Condé's army in 1799. Little by little these regiments' original aim of freeing France from the Revolution became subordinated to overall British strategy. The régiment de Mortemart was sent to Portugal to support an operation by the Portuguese army on its frontiers, faced with a French advance. In 1801 Louis-Victor-Léon fought in the Alemtejo campaign during the War of the Oranges. After 15 days in close contact near Abrantès, the Portuguese army (with the regiment attached) on one side and the Franco-Spanish army on the other both retired without a single shot being fired. Peace was signed in Madrid under the aegis of Lucien Bonaparte. Having entered the regiment as an ensign, the comte de Rochechouart was a sous-lieutenant by the time the regiment was dissolved in 1802. Aged 14, he returned to Paris, where for 2 years he spent his fortune on the pleasures in the capital. In 1804 he tried to get to Russia, where he had traced his mother and brother. With no money, he travelled in fantastical fashion, financing his trip in part by wins at the Milan casino. He was miraculously reunited with a relation in Vienna, who helped him get to Poland, where he found his mother in 1805. From there they traveled to the Crimea, where the countess of Rochechouart and her son were living. The reunions were short-lived, however - she died a few weeks later. Louis-Victor-Léon was thus taken in by his uncle the duke of Richelieu, governor of Odessa, over time becoming his adoptive son.

=== In the Tsar's service ===
Louis-Victor-Léon de Rochechouart entered the Russian army at the rank of sous-lieutenant and became aide de camp to the duke of Richelieu. He rose through the ranks, serving as a lieutenant in the imperial guard, then aide de camp de l'empereur Alexander I of Russia. From 1805 to 1812, he participated in the conquest of Bessarabia and Circassia, fought in Caucasia and Chechnya. When France invaded Russia in 1812, Rochechouart was mobilised in general Tormassov's army. He participated in the capture of Minsk, then at Berezina, where he witnessed the tragic crossing of the river by the French army. He summed up the Russian campaign thus:

Napoleon's plan was admirable and worthy of his genius. Its success, according to all human probabilities, was infallible. Only the decrees of Fortune, putting all foresight to waste, were able to accomplish this great disaster.

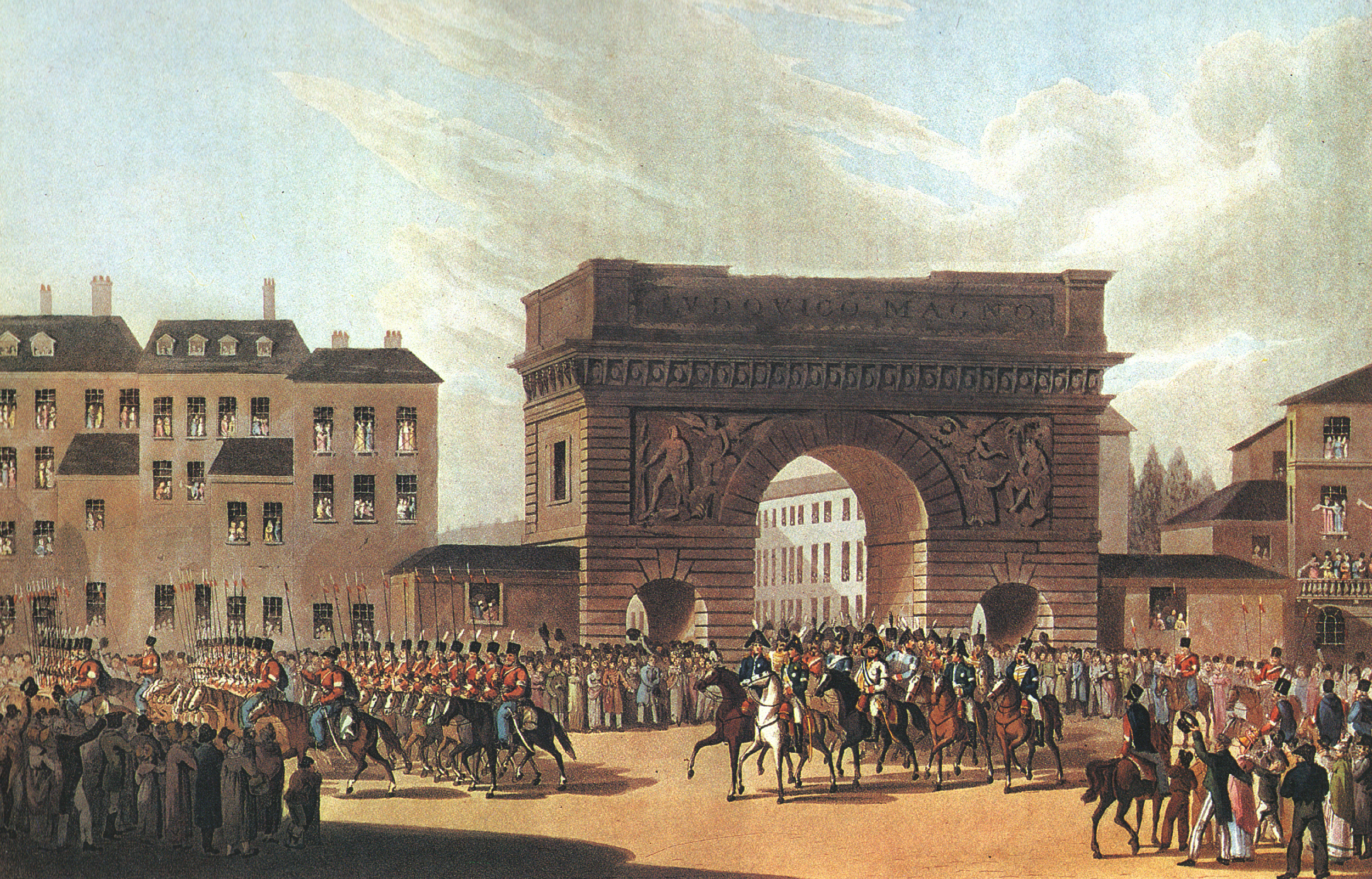
The Russian Army entering Paris

Made colonel then major-general, he fought in the subsequent German campaign at the battles of Lützen, Dresden, Kulm and Leipzig. In September that year he was sent on a mission to convince Napoleon's former Marshal, and Swedish Crown Prince Jean-Baptiste Bernadotte, to move his Army of the North across the Elbe to engage Napoleon's forces. At the start of 1814 he crossed the Rhine with the Russian army, setting foot in France for the first time in 10 years. He came into contact with the future Louis XVIII and Charles X and participated in the creation of a royalist party. His brother Louis, with whom he had shared many hardships, was killed at Brienne and so he became head of the House of Rochechouart. Louis-Victor-Léon fought in the Six Days Campaign and the battles of Arcis-sur-Aube, La Fère-Champenoise and Paris. Made commander of Paris, he captured the Hotel de Ville on 31 March. Face with rumours of a counter-attack by Napoleon, he organised the city's defences and then restored order in Paris, facing down the troubles provoked by the occupying troops by deploying mixed bodies of men consisting of both Russian and National Guard troops. On Louis XVIII's arrival on 20 April Rochechouart took leave of the Russian army to offer Louis his services.

=== Military governor of Paris ===
Louis-Victor-Léon de Rochechouart was made maréchal de camp by Louis XVIII, incorporated into the company of black musketeers and on 29 August made a knight of the Ordre de Saint-Louis. He accompanied the king to Ghent during the Hundred Days and on their return on the Second Restoration he rose to chef d'État-major to the minister of war, to duc de Feltre, then maréchal de Gouvion-Saint-Cyr, and then to the duc de Feltre when Rochechouart's adoptive father the duke of Richelieu was made prime minister. On 16 October 1815 Rochechouart was made military governor of Paris, occupying the post until 1821.

He was notable for his involvement in two major events of the Restoration. First, in November 1815, he took support to general Daumesnil, besieged at Fort de Vincennes by occupying Prussian troops. Impressed on their meeting by his courage and determination, Rochechouart intervened at the ministry in Daumesnil's favour. As commander of Paris, Rochechouart was entrusted with a much more dolorous task, that is, organising the execution of marshal Ney, a decision of which he disapproved, writing later

Not only was I forced to assist in his death, my duties obliged me to execute the decree of the Court of Peers as regarded this unjust victim of our reactionary policies.

He put a piémontais officer at the head of the execution squad, to avoid giving this duty to a French soldier. General Rochechouart also accompanied Ney's final hours and wrote a moving account of them in his memoirs, concluding "Here is a great lesson in learning well how to die".

In 1821, he was nominated Lord of the Royal bedchamber and commandeur of the Légion d'honneur. A few days after his 13 December 1821 wedding, he was put out of his job. In 1826, Louis-Victor-Léon de Rochechouart bought the château de Jumilhac and Château de Rochechouart.

In 1830, he participated in the Algerian expedition. In 1855, Napoleon III made general Rochechouart mayor of Jumilhac.

== Personal life ==
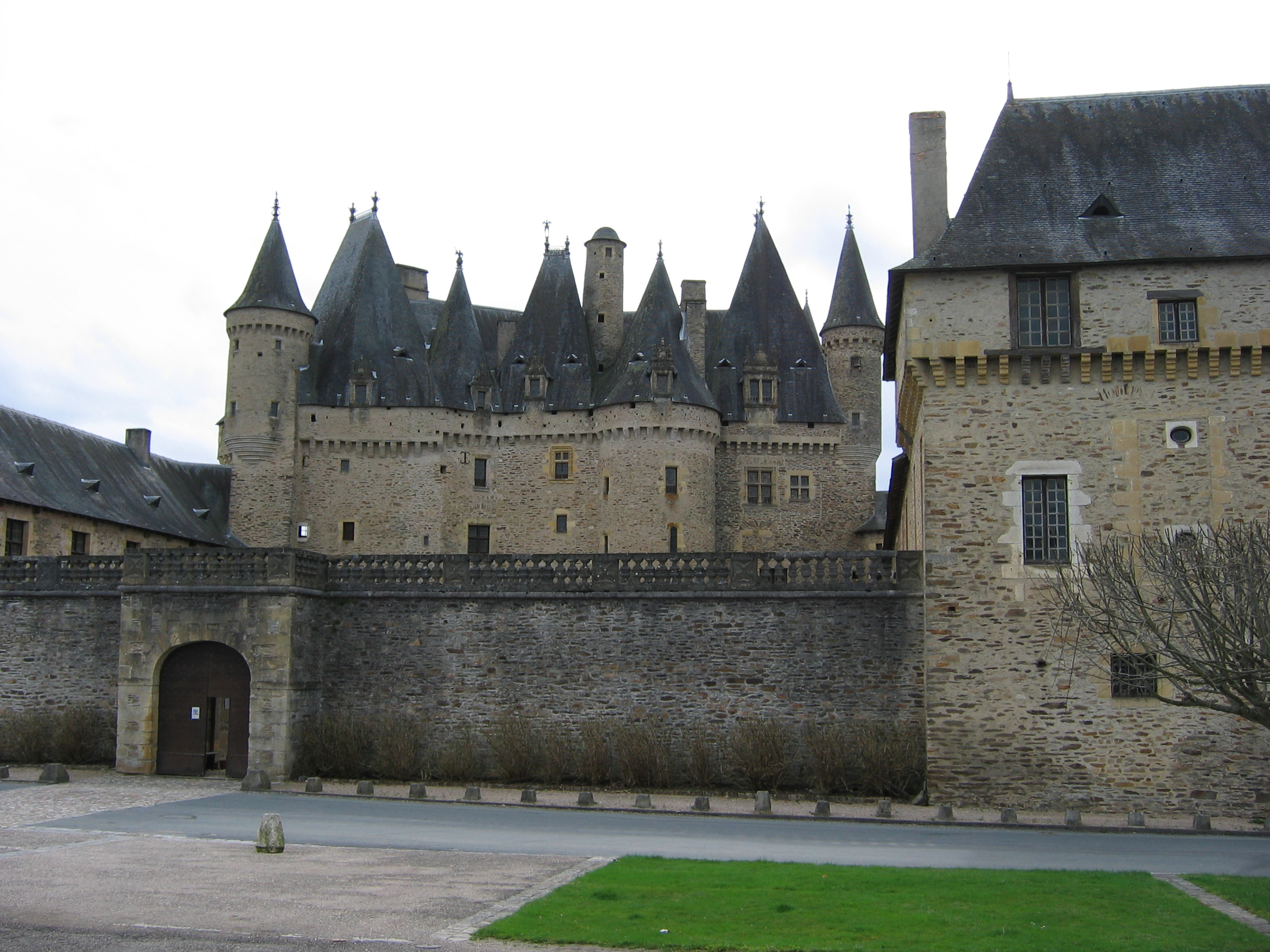
Château de Jumilhac

In 1821, he married Elisabeth Ouvrard, daughter of the banker and businessman Gabriel-Julien Ouvrard, with an immense fortune. The lavish ceremony occurred on 13 December 1821 occurred in the presence of the Prime Minister, the Duke of Richelieu, Louis XVIII, and the future Charles X and Louis Philippe I. They had four children:

- Madeleine-Elisabeth-Gabrielle de Rochechouart (1822–1889), who became the marquise de la Garde.
- Valentine de Rochechouart (1825–1907), who became the comtesse de Montalembert.
- Aimery de Rochechouart (1828–1897)
- Louis-Jules de Rochechouart (1830–1880)

Rochechouart died in Jumilhac-le-Grand in 1858.

== Works ==
- Souvenirs sur la Révolution et l'Empire (Plon, 1898 & 1933) - a highly interesting work on its era, attempting to be objective and unpartisan and rich in anecdotes on the French Revolution, the émigré regiments, early 19th century Russia and especially the Napoleonic Wars, the Hundred Days and the Bourbon Restoration
- Histoire de la Maison de Rochechouart (872 pages, Paris, 1859) - a very rich and complete work on his family history.
- Memoirs of the Count de Rochechouart (1920)

== Sources ==
- Georges Martin, Histoire et généalogie de la Maison de Rochechouart (1990)
- Pierre Ortega, Louis-Victor-Léon, Comte de Rochechouart (2002)
- Jacques Wolf, Le financier Ouvrard (Taillandier, 1992)
- Sir Dunbar Plunket Barton, "Bernadotte Prince and King" (1925)
- Comte Aymar d'Arlot de Saint-Saud, Desecendance du Général Comte de Rochechouart (Bergerac, 1936);
