= Philippe Joseph Henri Lemaire =

French sculptor

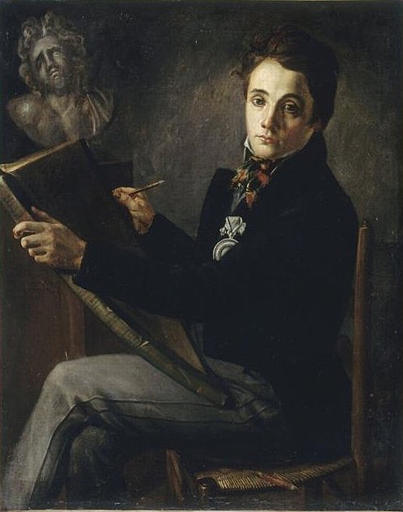
Portrait of Henri Lemaire by Félix Auvray (1818)

Philippe Joseph Henri Lemaire (French: [ɑ̃ʁi ləmɛʁ]; 9 January 1798, Valenciennes - 2 August 1880, Paris) was a French sculptor, working in a neoclassical academic style.

== Life and career ==
He was a pupil of Pierre Cartellier, and won the Prix de Rome for sculpture in 1821.

Lemaire sculpted the high relief of the Last Judgment for the pediment of the Église de la Madeleine, Paris. He is among the major academic sculptors of France who are represented in the sculpture of the Arc de Triomphe, Paris: the others are Jean-Pierre Cortot, François Rude, Antoine Étex, and James Pradier.

His bronze monument for the city of Quimper, commemorating the Breton Napoleonic hero and antiquarian, Théophile Corret de la Tour d'Auvergne, was melted down during World War II.

== Selected works ==
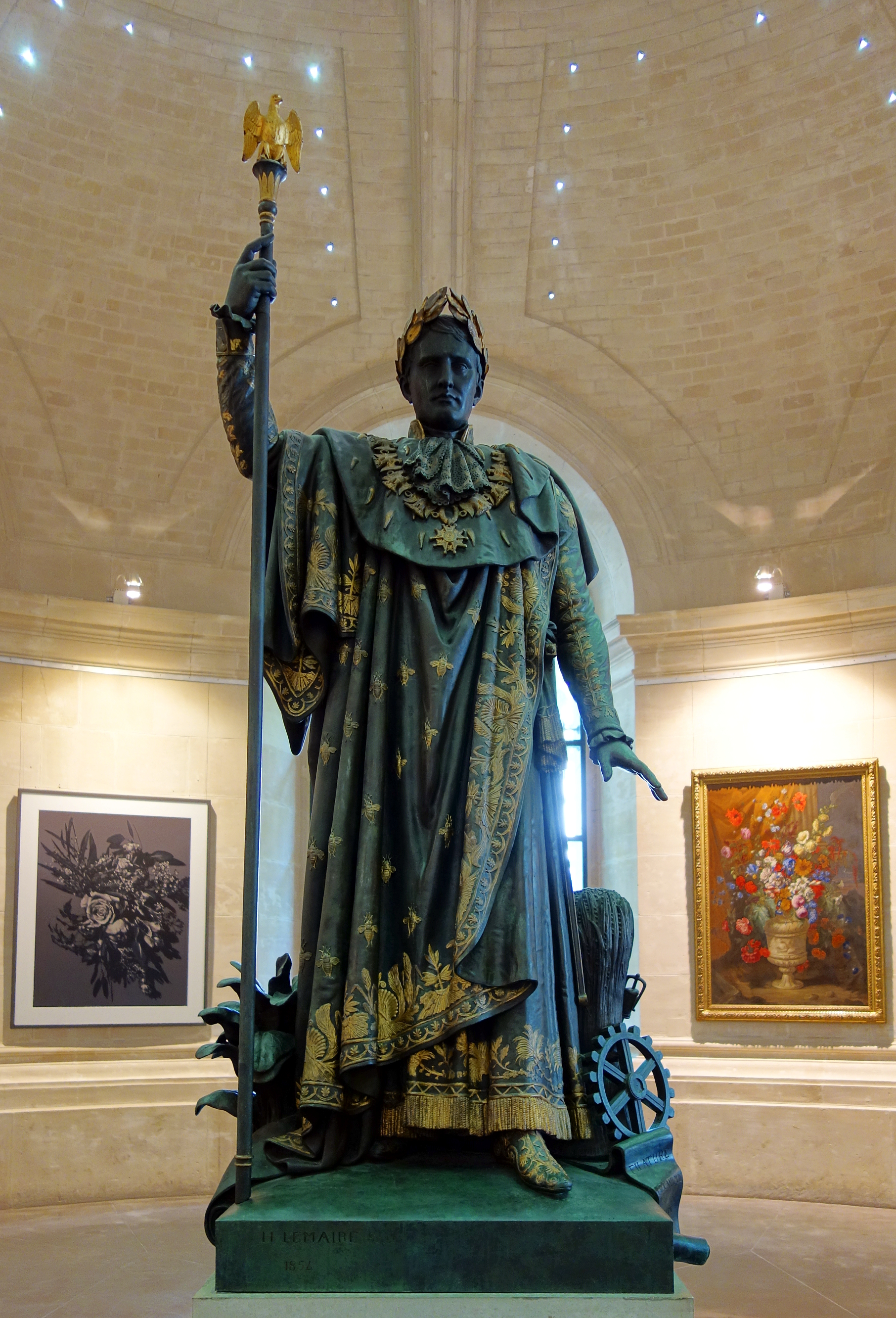
Napoleon at the Palais des Beaux-Arts de Lille.

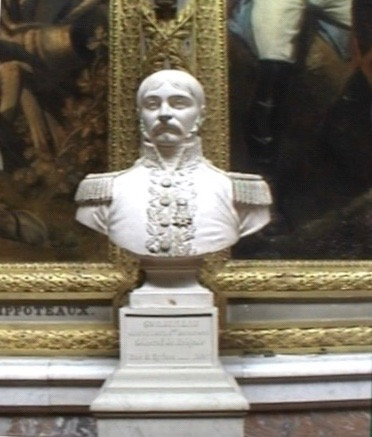
Portrait bust of
Claude Corbineau

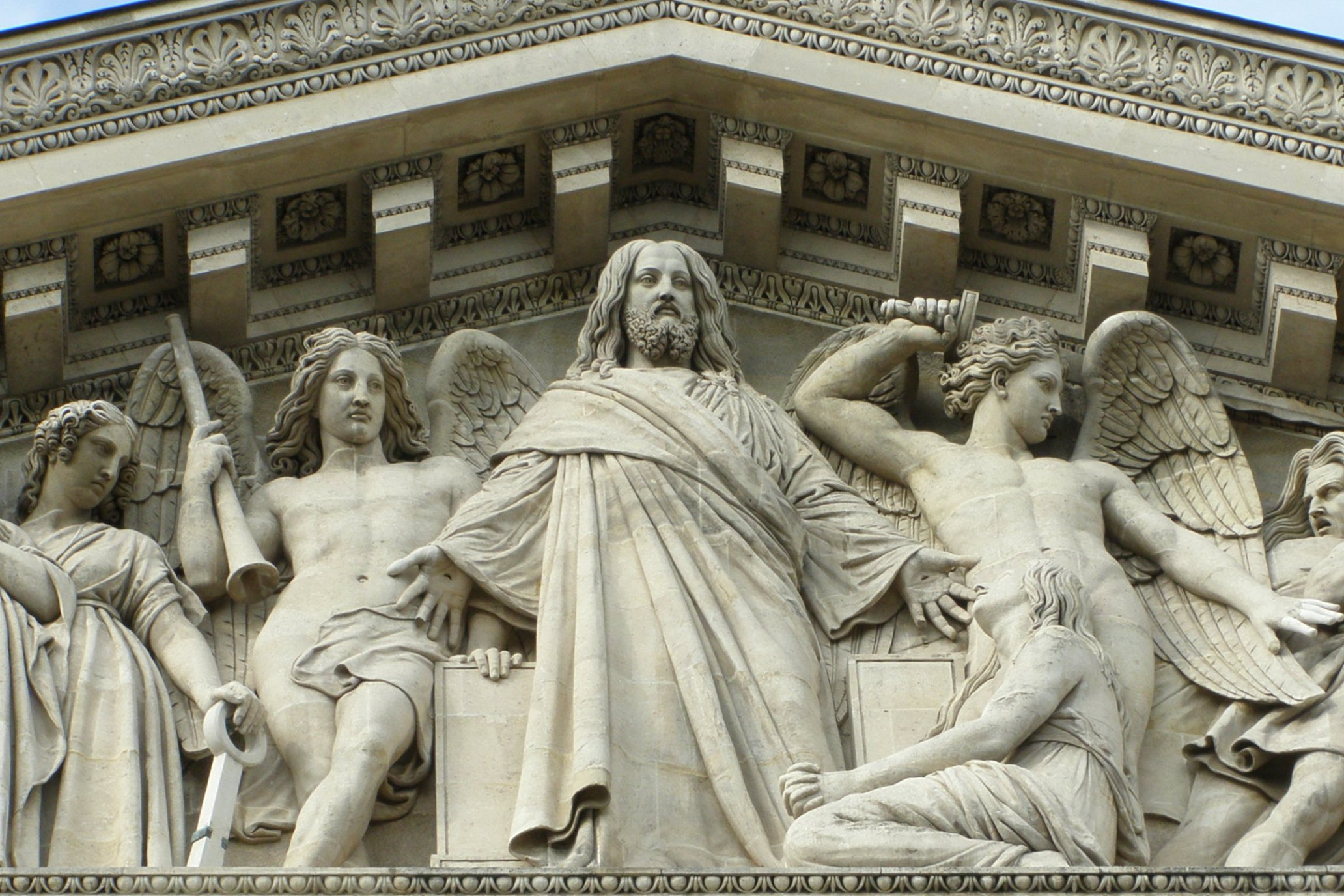
Detail of the pediment sculptures, Église de la Madeleine

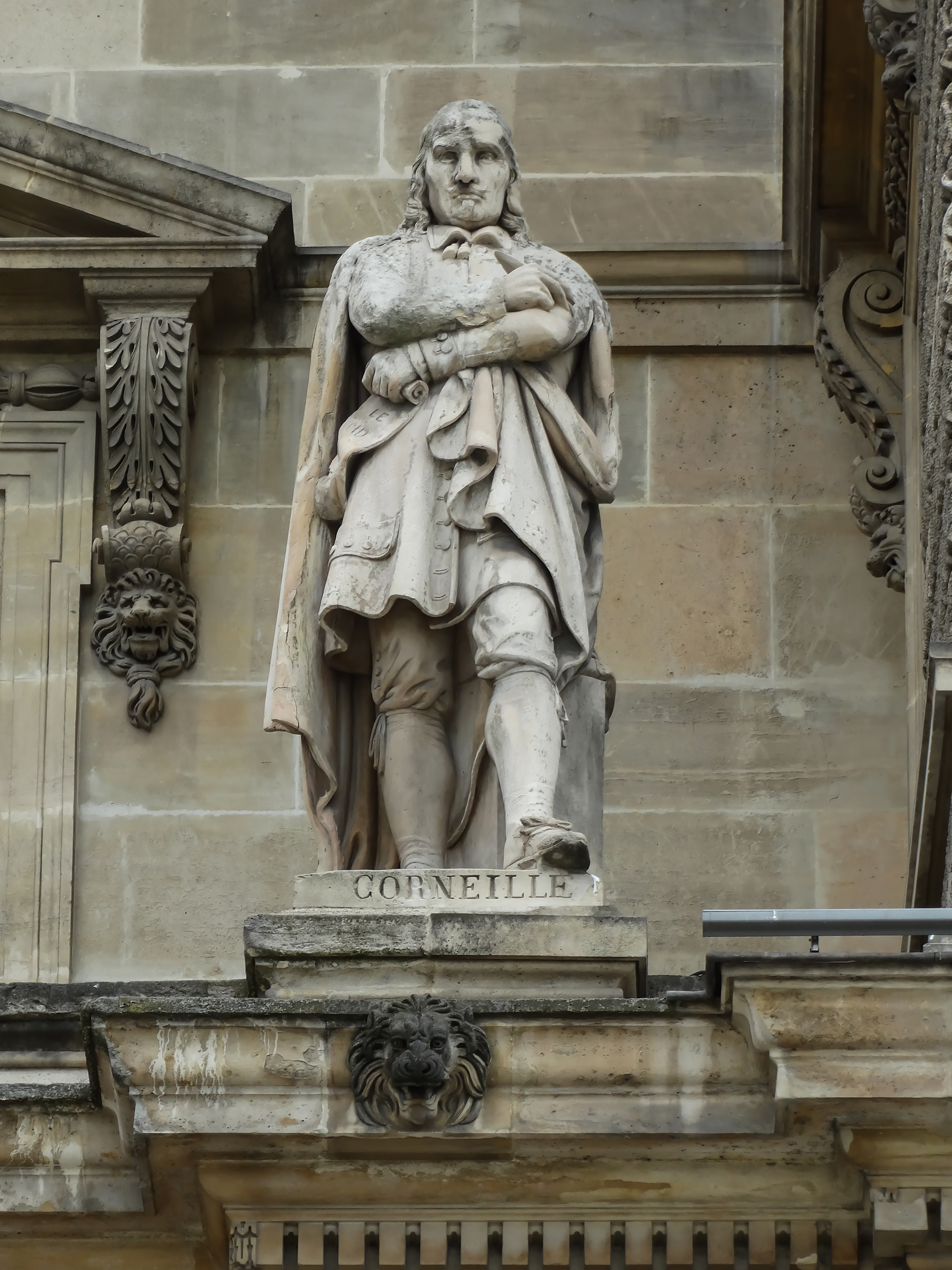
Pierre Corneille at the Louvre

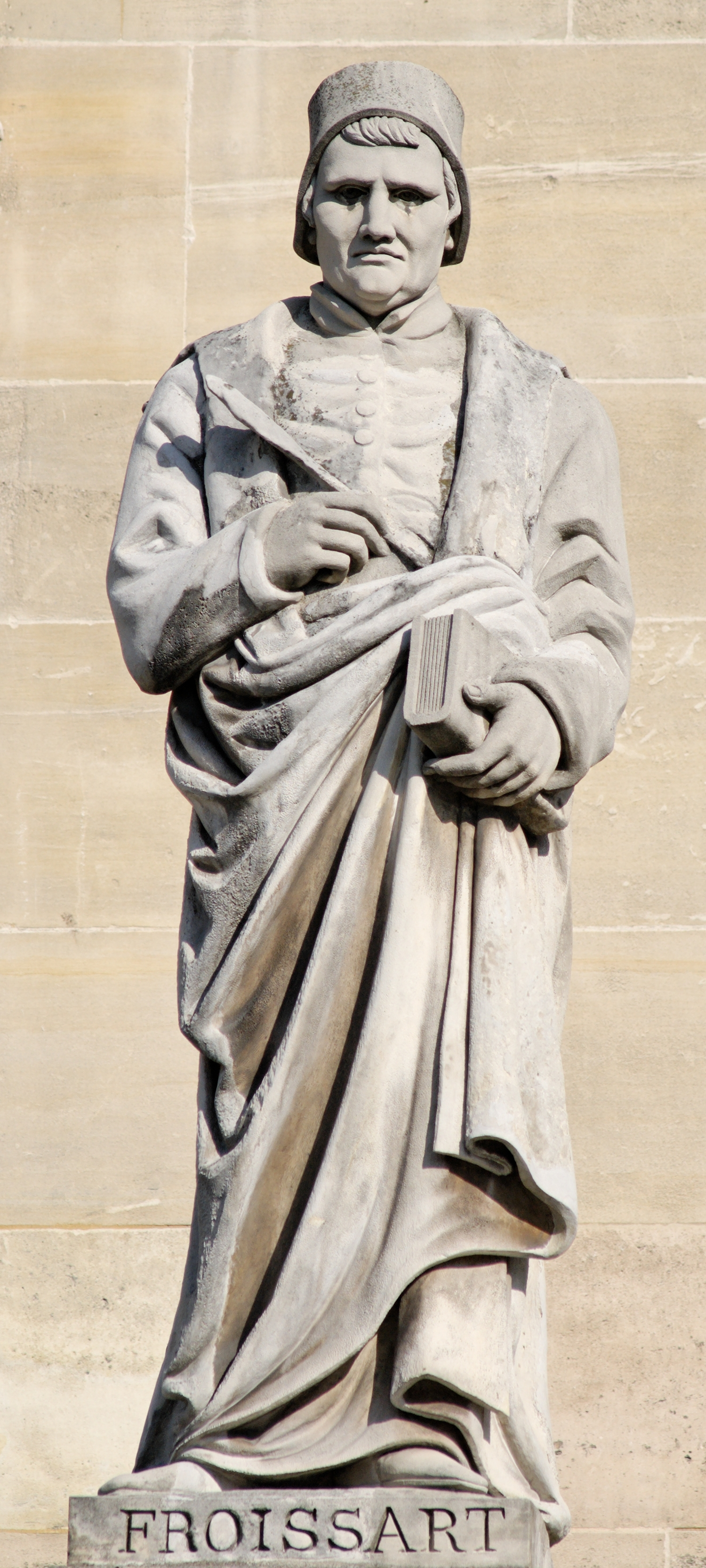
Jehan Froissart at the Louvre

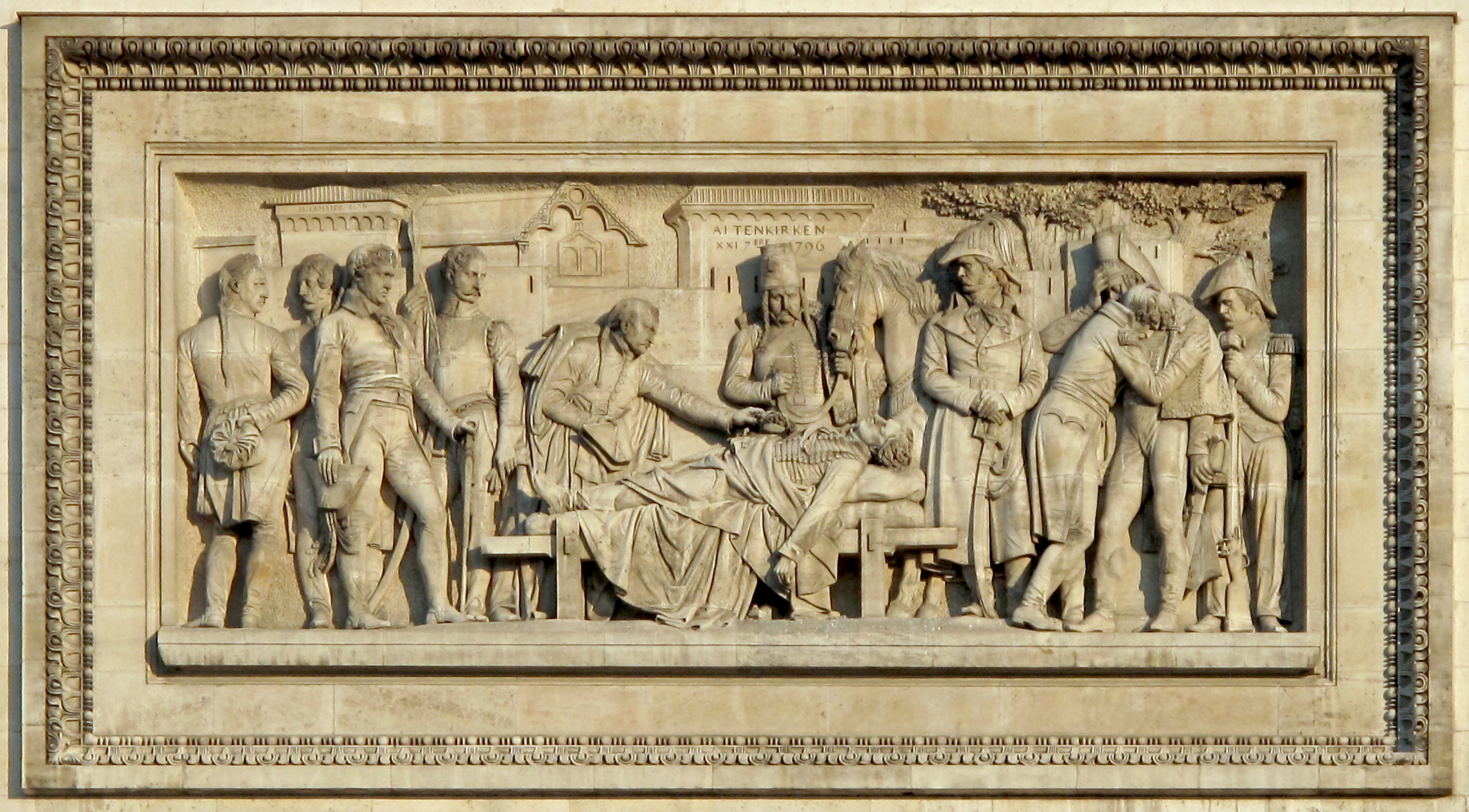
Les Funérailles du général Marceau, Arc de Triomphe

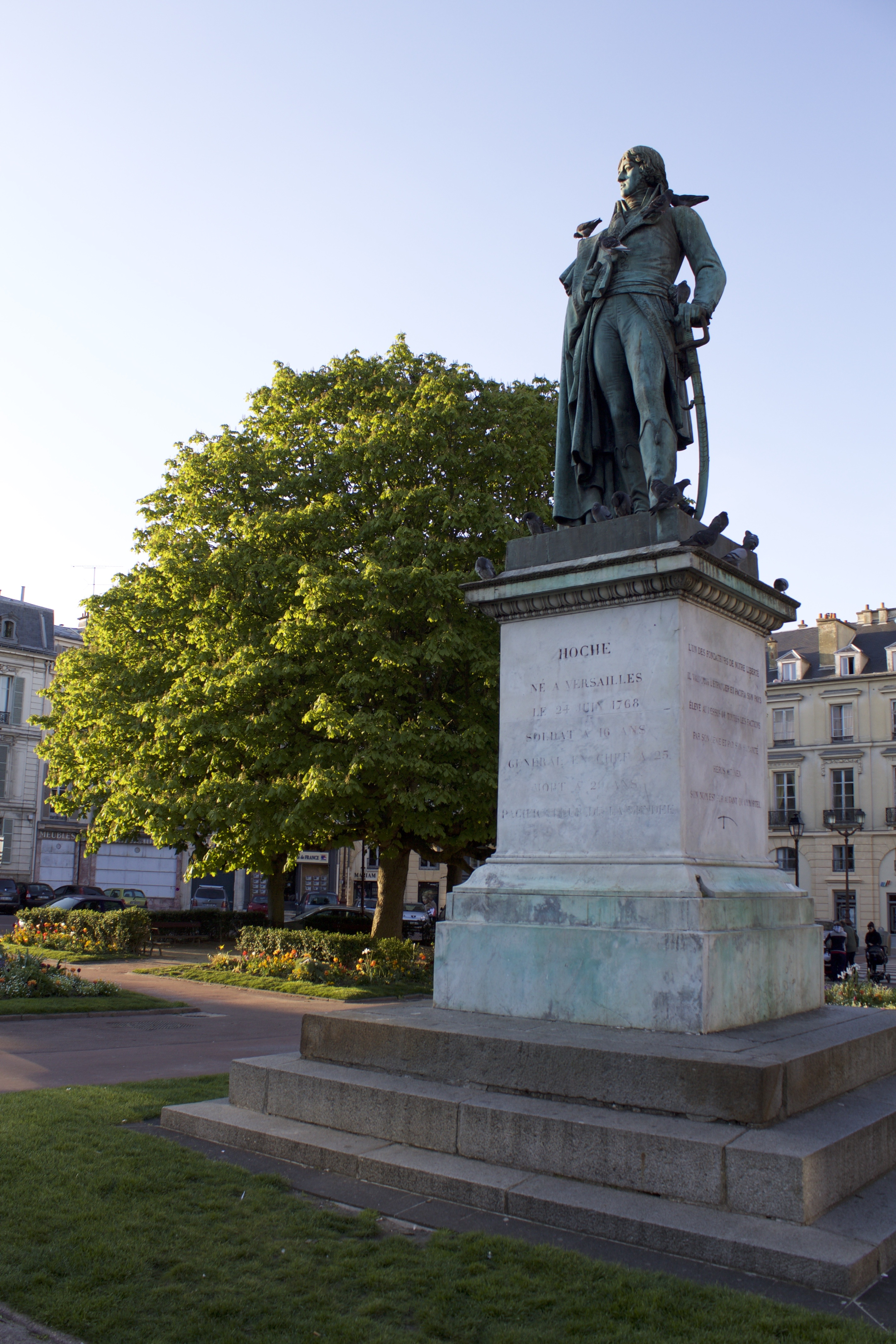
Monument to Hoche, Versailles

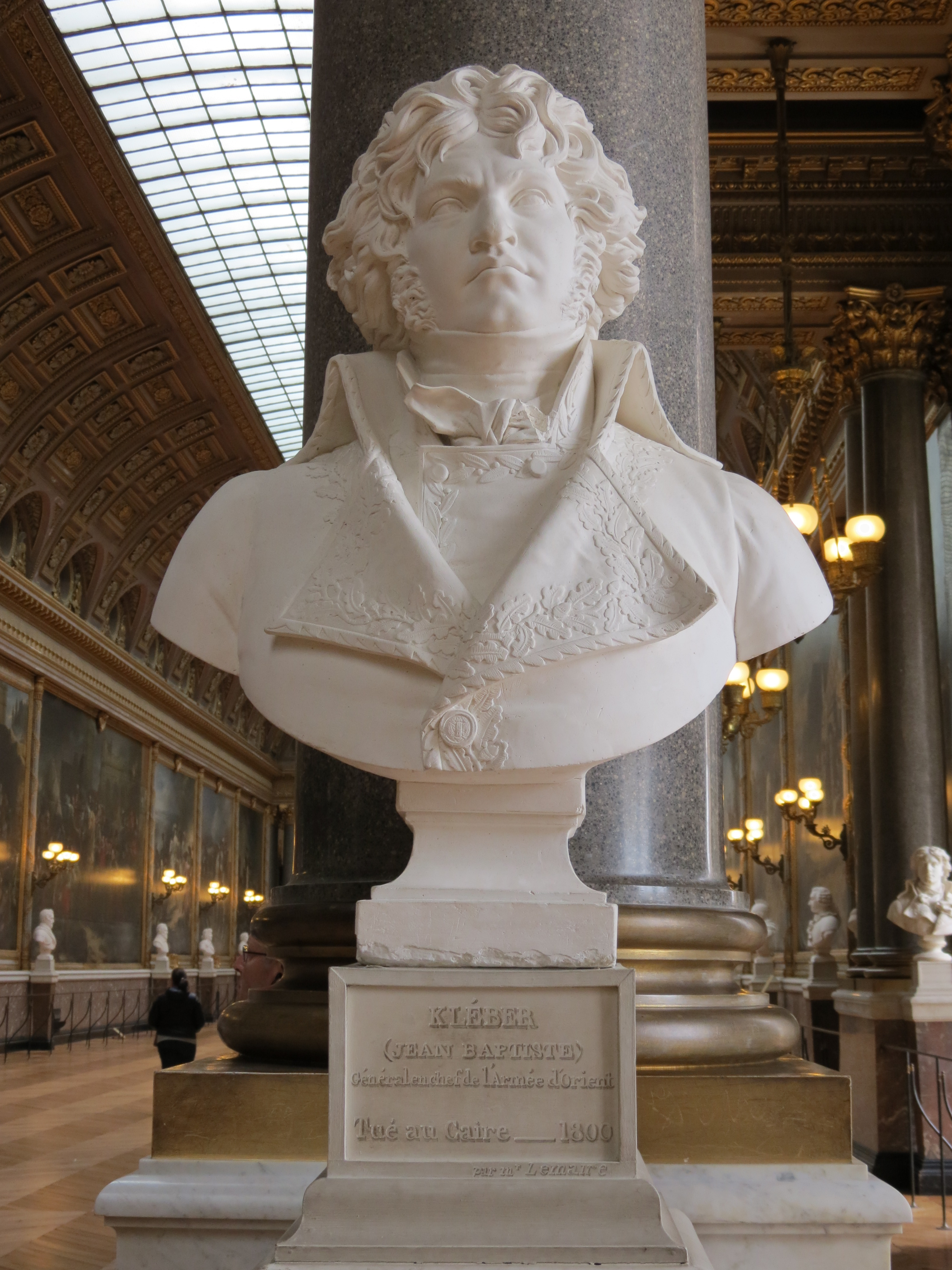
Jean-Baptiste Kléber at the Palace of Versailles.

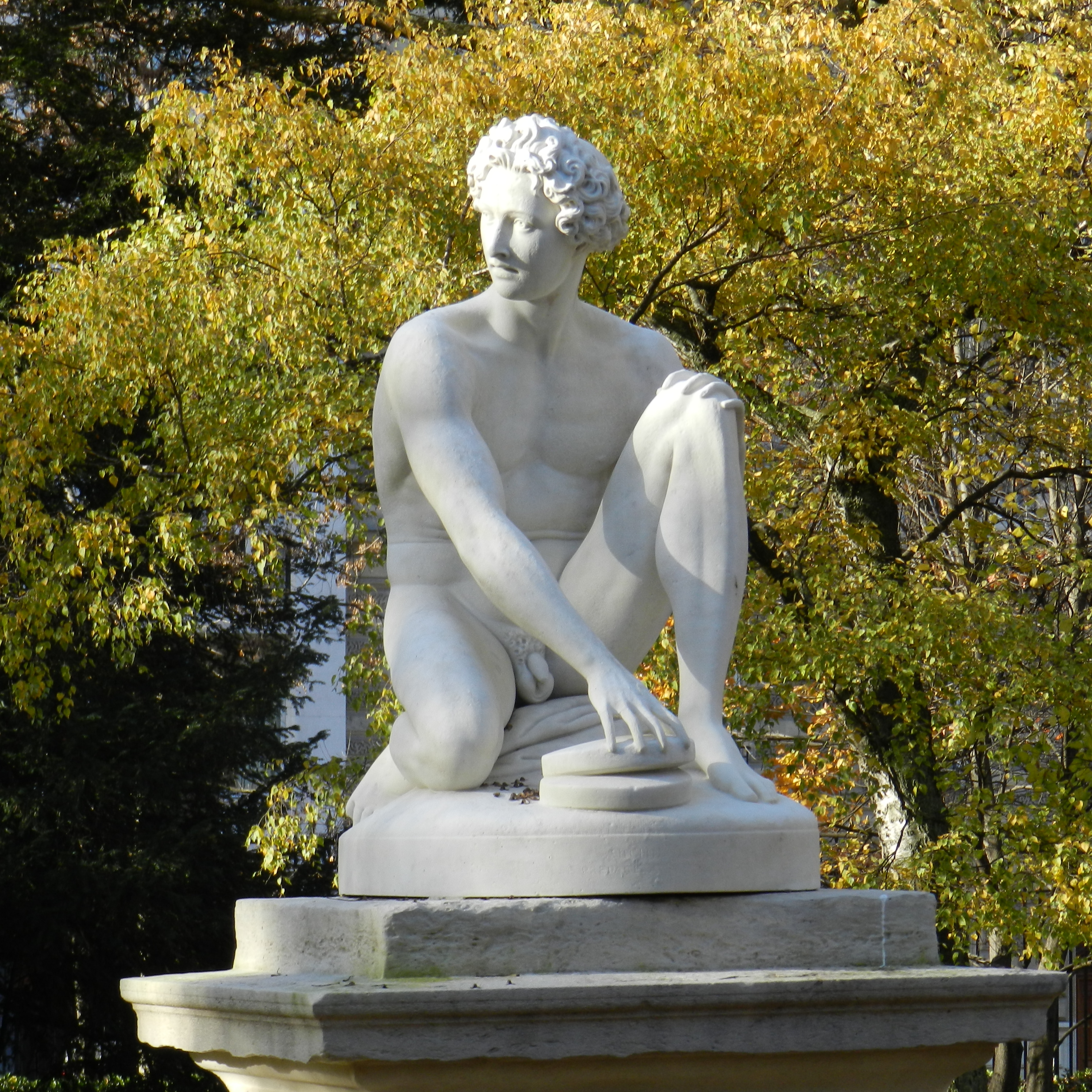
Archimadas se prépare à lancer le disque, Jardin du Luxembourg
