= Château de Rochechouart =

13th-century castle in France

Coordinates: 45°49′17″N 0°49′9″E

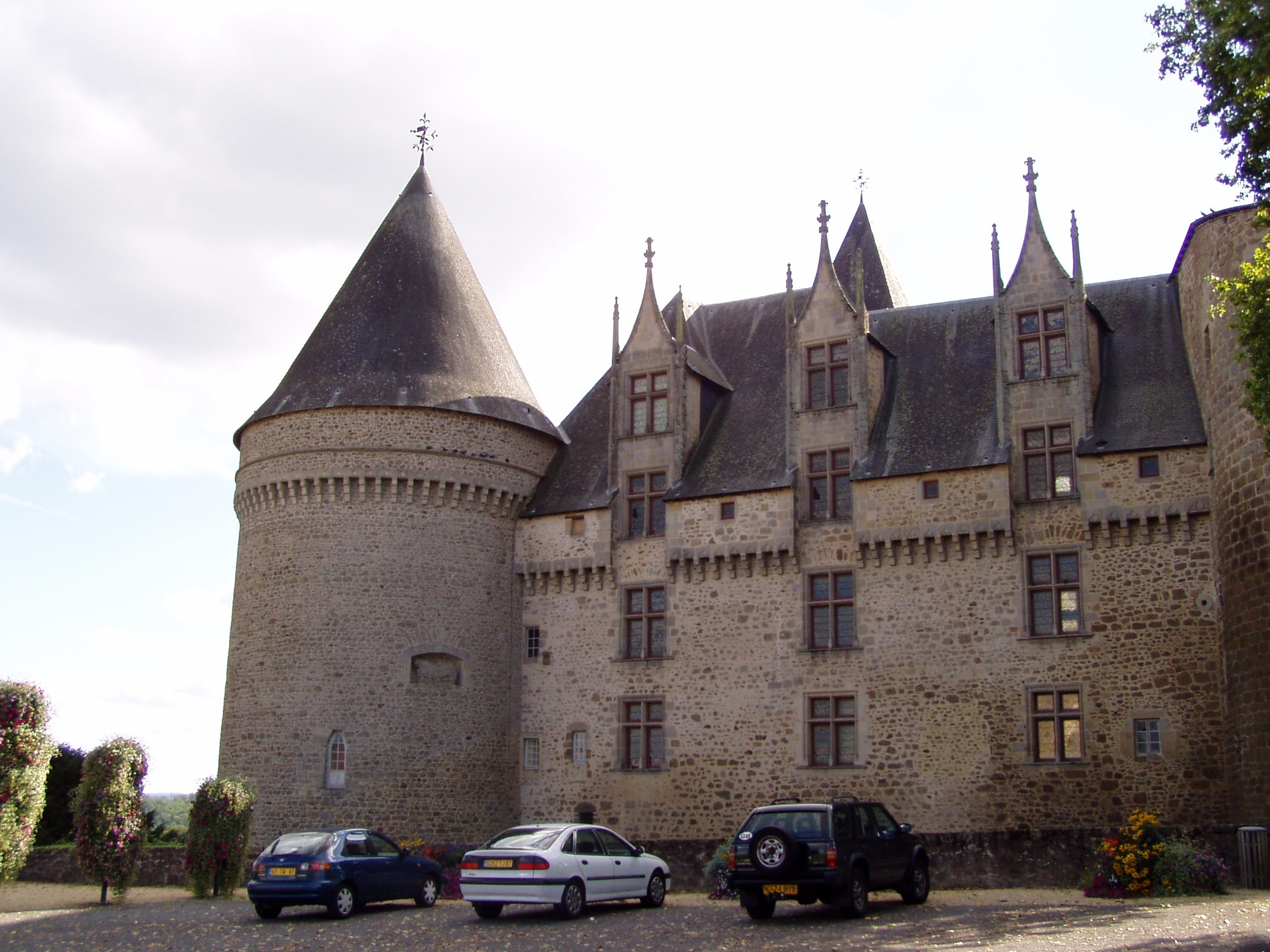
Château de Rochechouart

Château de Rochechouart is a thirteenth-century French castle, located at the top of the confluence of the Grêne and Vayres rivers in the commune of Rochechouart within the département of Haute-Vienne.

== Background ==
The Viscounts of Rochechouart reigned for 800 years in the castle.

- Aymeric I, who lived around 990, was the ancestor of the dynasty.
- Aymeric IV took part in the First Crusade at the side of Godfrey of Bouillon
- Aymeric VI (1170-1230) built the current castle, of which the keep and the entry châtelet remain. In 1205, his wife Alix, accused of adultery by the intendant of the castle, was locked up in the lion's cage in the east tower. The animal did not devour her, but lay down at her feet instead. She was cleared and the intendant was thrown into cage, where he was eaten soon after.
- Aymeric IX took part in 1283 in the Aragon expedition, at the side of French King Philippe III the Bold.
- Simon and Jean I fought in Flanders in 1304 and 1328 beside Kings Philippe le Bel and Philippe VI. In 1346, Viscount Jean I took part in the battle of Crécy. He was killed ten years later, during the battle of Poitiers, defending King John II.
- The castle was a centre of resistance to the English during the Hundred Years War with Louis, Chamberlain of king Charles V, companion-in-arms of Bertrand du Guesclin, then his son Jean II and his grandson Geoffroy, who was a companion of Joan of Arc.
- Viscount Foucaud (1440-1472) was an advisor to king Louis XI.
- Viscount Jean de Rochechouart-Ponville restored the castle in the French Renaissance style.
- François, son of Jean, decorating the hunting room. He was condemned to exile, accused of the murder of Pierre Bermondet.
- Claude, his son, decorated the Hercules room. He was a comrade in arms of the constable Anne de Montmorency, and was wounded and made captive at the battle of Saint-Quentin in 1557.
- Françoise-Athenaïs de Rochechouart, also known as Madame de Montespan, was the favourite of Louis XIV.
- During the Reign of Terror, viscountess Marie-Victoire de Rochechouart was arrested and imprisoned in Paris, where she was guillotined in 1794.
- General-Count Louis-Victor-Léon de Rochechouart fought during Napoleonic wars. He took part in Russian and French Campaigns, and also the Battle of Berezina. Governor of Paris (1814-1821). His son Louis-Jules de Rochechouart sold the Castle to the general council of Haute-Vienne in 1936.
- His lineage represents the Rochechouart dynasty today.

== Today ==
At the beginning of the 1980s, the rooms of the castle serve as a setting for various events, one of the most prestigious of which is the exhibition "Hugo and the France of his time" organized, with the participation of the most eminent hugophiles (Luc Bérimont, Henri Guillemin, René Journet, Pierre Seghers...), by the Rochechouart Artistic and Literary Center directed by Raymond Leclerc.

Nowadays the castle houses the subprefecture buildings, and since 1985 the museum of contemporary art where one can admire the works of Dadaist artist, Raoul Hausmann, and works of international artists from the 1960s to today, such as Giuseppe Penone, Arte Povera, Christian Boltanski or Tony Cragg.

It is also possible to visit the hunting room where multicoloured frescos from the beginning of sixteenth century are displayed, and the Hercules room decorated with murals in grisaille from the mid-sixteenth century. In the main courtyard one can admire the gallery supported by twisted columns.

Château de Rochechouart is listed as a monument historique by the French Ministry of Culture.

== See also ==
- List of castles in France
