= Hercule Corbineau =

French soldier (1780–1823)

Marie Louis Hercule Hubert Corbineau
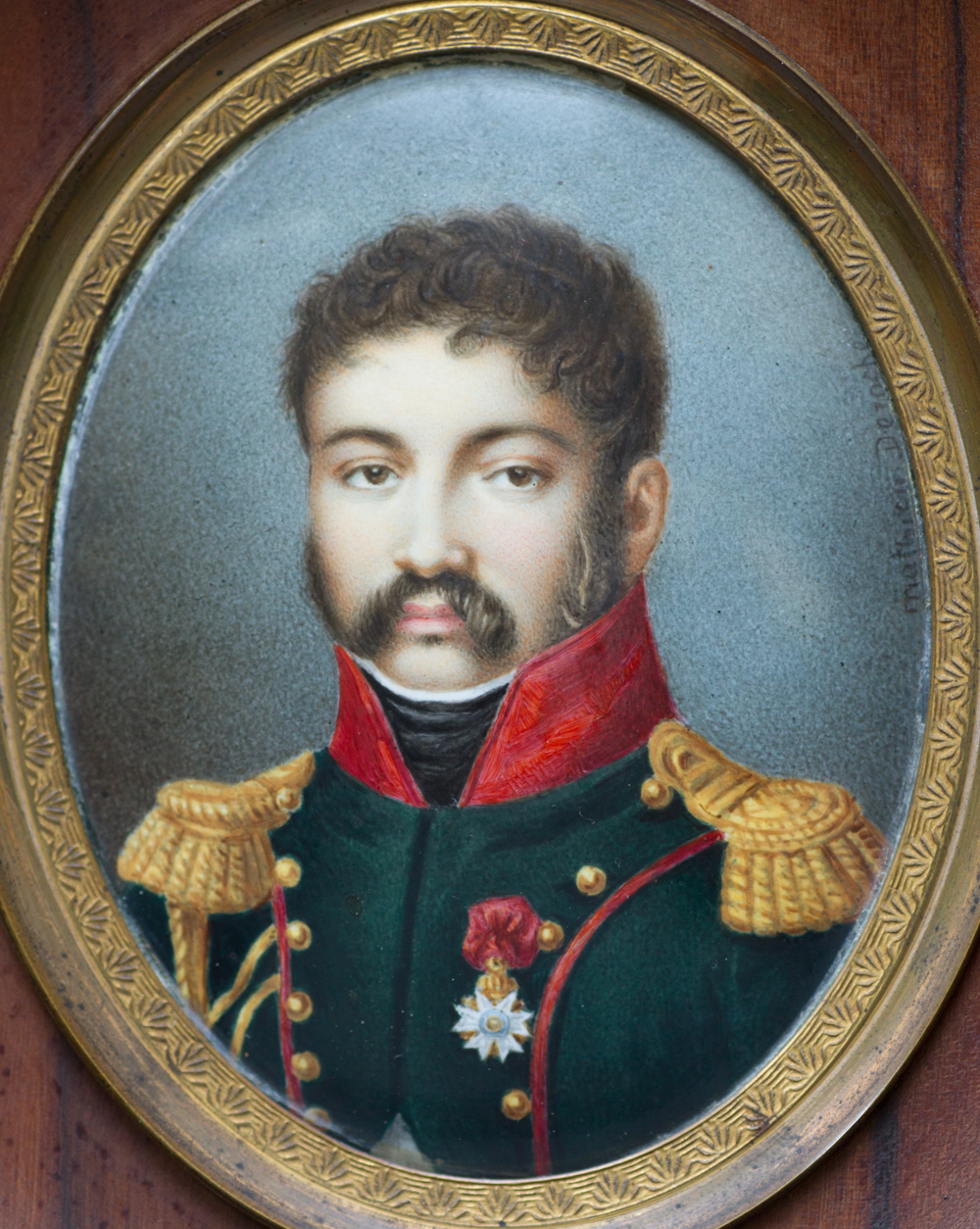
- Born: 10 April 1780; Marchiennes, Nord
- Died: 5 April 1823 (aged 42); Chalons-sur-Marne, Marne
- Burial place: Cimetière de l'Ouest, Chalons-sur-Marne
- Relatives: Jean Corbineau; Claude Corbineau (brothers)
- Military career
- Allegiance: (France) French First Republic (France) First French Empire
- Service years: 1793–1809
- Rank: Colonel
- Units: Légion des Francs; 7th Regiment of Hussars; 5th Regiment of Chasseurs; Chasseurs à Cheval de la Garde Impériale
- Conflicts: French Revolutionary Wars; Napoleonic Wars
- Awards: Legionnaire of the Legion of Honour (5 November 1804); Officer of the Legion of Honour (17 November 1808); Baron of the Empire (1 June 1810)

Marie Louis Hercule Hubert Corbineau (French pronunciation: [maʁi lwi ɛʁkyl ybɛʁ kɔʁbino]; 10 April 1780 – 5 April 1823) was a French soldier of the eighteenth and nineteenth centuries.

== Biography ==
Corbineau was born in Marchiennes, the youngest son of Jean-Charles Corbineau, Inspector General of the King's Stables in the Généralité of Tours and bailiff-general of Marchiennes Abbey, and his wife Mary-Louise-Magdeleine Varlet. His older brothers Jean and Claude were also army officers, and together the three men were known as les trois Horaces ("the three Horatii").

Corbineau volunteered for service in the Navy on 1 April 1793, when only 12 years old, to save his father from persecution by the revolutionaries. After serving aboard the privateer Requin and the corvette Naïade, he then entered the Army, as a private soldier in the Légion des Francs, serving in the Army of the North.

He transferred to the cavalry of the Légion des Francs, and was promoted to sous-lieutenant on 20 September 1796. With his brother Claude, he participated in the expedition to Ireland in December 1796.

Promoted to lieutenant on 30 October 1797, he served in campaigns with the Army of Helvetia and the Army of the Rhine, joining the 7th Regiment of Hussars on 29 July 1798, and transferring the 5th Regiment of Chasseurs on 5 April 1800. Corbineau distinguished himself at the battle of Hohenlinden on 3 December 1800. He served as adjudant-major from 2 April 1802, and was promoted to capitaine on 16 March 1804. On 5 November 1804 he was made a Legionnaire of the Legion of Honour.

Corbineau entered the Imperial Guard on 12 September 1805, where he served in the Chasseurs à Cheval de la Garde Impériale successively as an adjoint à l'état-major (assistant to the Staff), then adjudant-major, and finally as a chef d'escadron. He fought at the battles of Austerlitz (2 December 1805), afterwards receiving promotion to major (18 December 1805), and also at Jena (14 October 1806), Eylau (7/8 February 1807)—where he was wounded in the right thigh, and his older brother Claude was killed—and Friedland (14 June 1807).

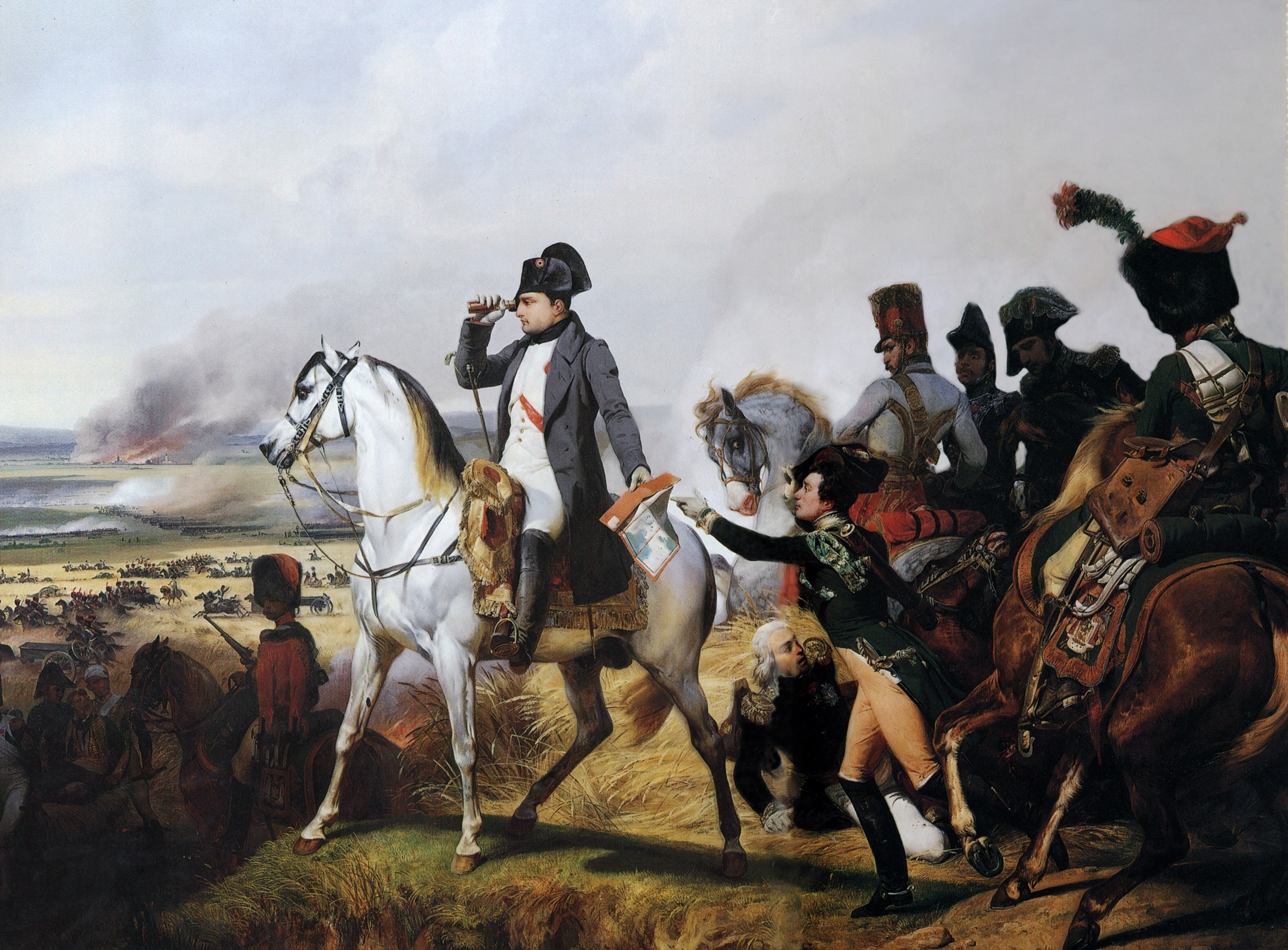
The Battle of Wagram by Horace Vernet. Corbineau is shown injured at the lower left.

He was awarded the rank of Officer of the Legion of Honour on 17 November 1808, and promoted to colonel on 13 June 1809. At the battle of Wagram (5–6 July 1809), while his regiment attacked a battery, Corbineau's right knee was shattered by a musket ball, necessitating the amputation of his leg at the thigh, putting an end to his military career.

Corbineau recovered in hospital alongside his friend Pierre Yrieix Daumesnil, who had suffered a similar wound. One night, Daumesnil heard what sounded like water dripping. He called out to Corbineau, but got no reply. Despite his unhealed amputation, Daumesnil crawled out of his bed and found that Corbineau's wound was haemorrhaging badly. Daumesnil crawled out of the room and down two flights of stairs to call for help before passing out. Doctors arrived, and both men's lives were saved. In honour of Corbineau's and Daumesnil's service, Napoleon left them on the roll of the Chasseurs, despite the fact that neither served with the regiment again.

Corbineau returned to France and was given the post of Receveur Général des Finances (Receiver General of Finances) for the department of Seine-Inférieure on 14 March 1810, based at Rouen. He was made a Baron of the Empire on 1 June 1810, and was also a member of the Electoral College of the Northern Department. In 1814, after the First Restoration, Corbineau was transferred to the department of the Marne, where he died on 5 April 1823.

== Personal life ==
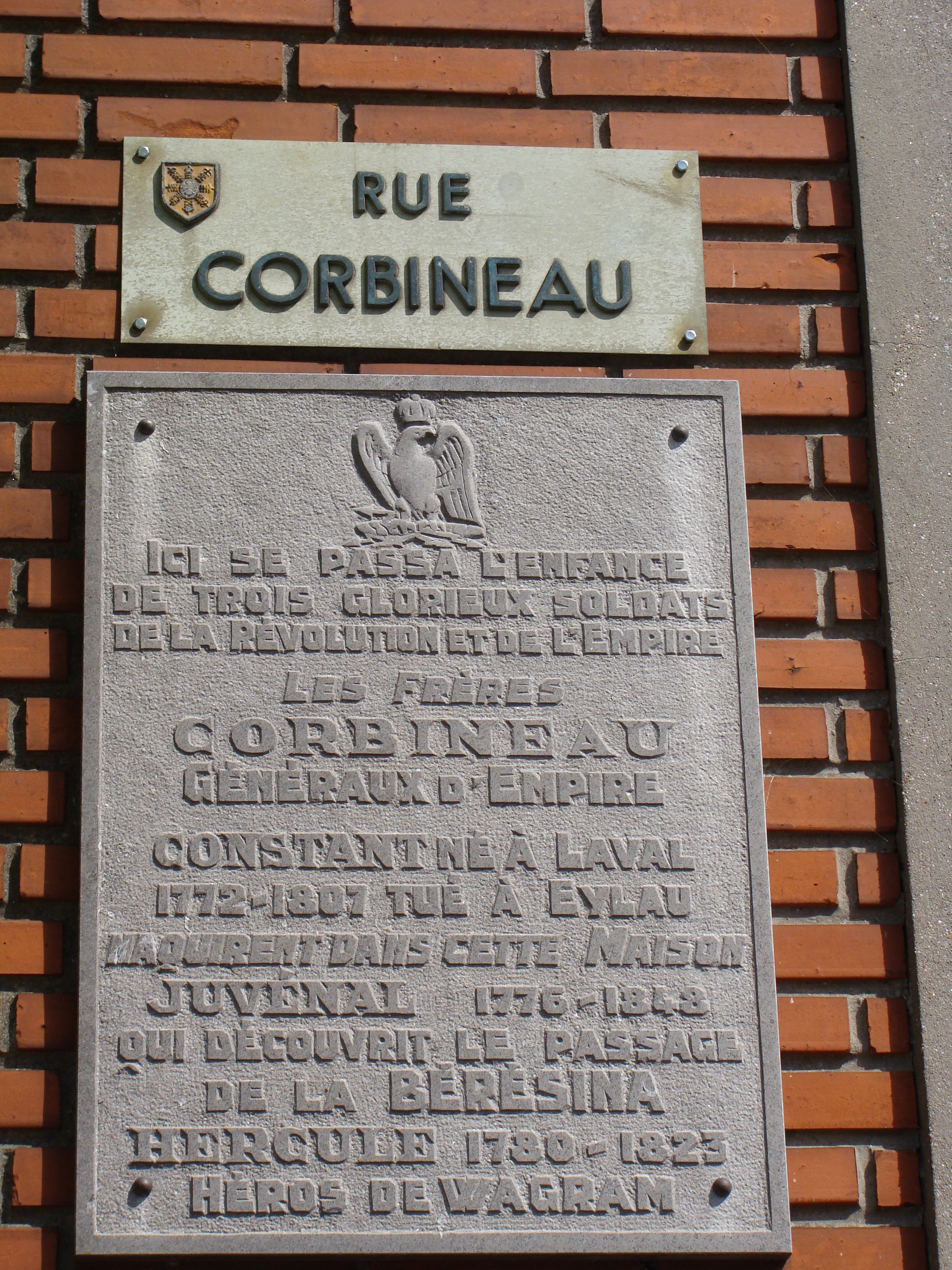
Commemorative plaque to the Corbineau brothers, Rue Corbineau, Marchiennes

In 1810 Corbineau married Reine Rose Kermarec de Travrou, the daughter of a former member of Parlement of Rennes, and had a son, Eugène-Hercule, and a daughter, Adèle-Marie, who married the Comte de Champagny (son of the Duke of Cadore) in Paris on 30 July 1836.
