= Marquis of Jumilhac =

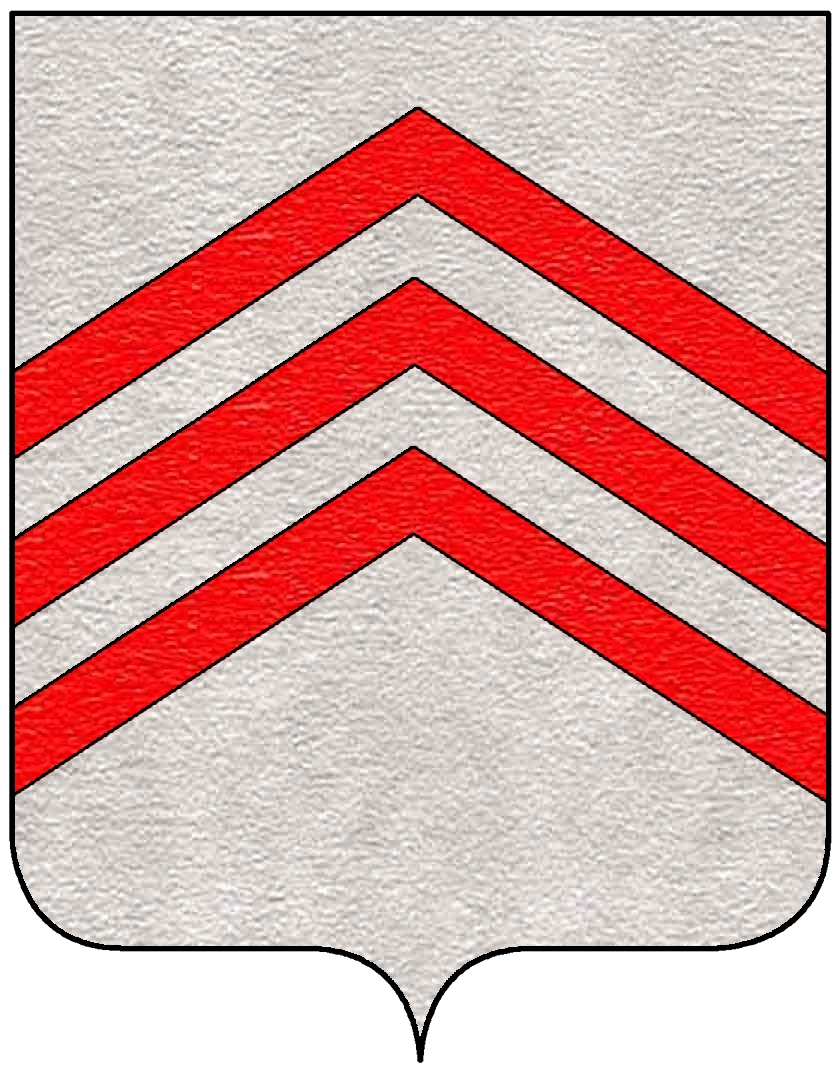
Arms of the Chapelle de Jumilhac family

The Marquis of Jumilhac was a title in the French nobility that was created in 1655 and became extinct in 1980 upon the death of the 10th Marquis.

== History ==
The title was created in September 1655 on the locality of Jumilhac-le-Grand, capital of the canton of the district of Nontron. It was created in favor of François Chapelle (d. 1675), Knight, Lord of Jumilhac. His descendants bore the title of Duke of Richelieu from 1822 to 1952. The elder branch having died out, the title of marquis passed to a cadet branch, which died out in the male line shortly after.

== List of the Marquesses of Jumilhac ==
1. 1655–1675: François Chapelle de Jumilhac (1617–1675), Lord of Jumilhac.
2. 1675–1693: Jean-François Chapelle de Jumilhac (1649–1693), son of the preceding.
3. 1693–1783: Pierre-Joseph Chapelle de Jumilhac (1692–1783), son of the preceding.
4. 1783–1798: Pierre-Marie Chapelle de Jumilhac (1735–1798), son of the preceding.
5. 1798–1826: Antoine-Pierre-Joseph Chapelle de Jumilhac (1764–1826), son of the preceding.
6. 1826–1879: Armand-Odet Chapelle de Jumilhac (1804–1879), 6th Duke of Richelieu and Duke of Fronsac in 1822, Peer of France, son of the preceding.
7. 1879–1880: Armand Chapelle de Jumilhac (1847–1880), 7th Duke of Richelieu and Duke of Fronsac, nephew of the preceding.
8. 1880–1952: Odet-Armand Chapelle de Jumilhac (1875–1952), 8th and last Duke of Richelieu, last Duke of Fronsac, son of the preceding.
9. 1952–1952: Armand-Odet Chapelle de Jumilhac (1886–1966), great-great-nephew of the preceding. Relinquished in favor of his brother.
10. 1952–1980: Raymond-Odet Chapelle de Jumilhac (1887–1980), brother of the preceding.

== See also ==
- List of French marquesses
- French nobility
