= Jean Corbineau =

French cavalry general

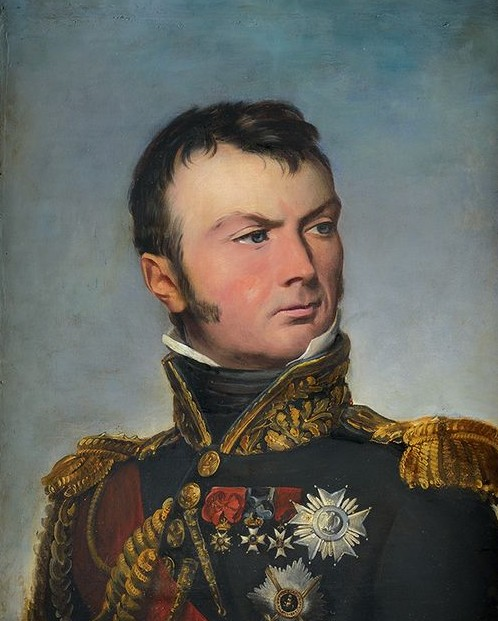
Jean-Baptiste Juvénal Corbineau

Jean-Baptiste Juvénal Corbineau (French pronunciation: [ʒɑ̃ batist ʒyvenal kɔʁbino]; 1 August 1776, Marchiennes – 18 December 1848, Paris) was a French cavalry general of the French Revolutionary Wars and Napoleonic Wars. His two brothers Claude and Hercule also fought in both these wars and together the three men were known as "les trois Horaces" (the three Horatii).
