= Claude Corbineau =

French general

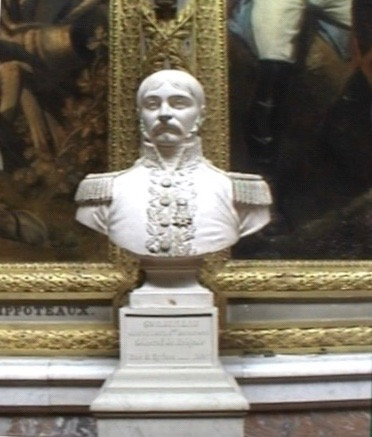
Portrait bust of Corbineau by Philippe Joseph Henri Lemaire

Claude Louis Constant Esprit Juvénal Gabriel Corbineau (French pronunciation: [klod lwi kɔ̃stɑ̃ ɛspʁi ʒyvenal ɡabʁijɛl kɔʁbino]; 7 March 1772, Laval – 8 February 1807, battle of Eylau) was a French general. His two brothers Jean and Hercule also fought in both these wars and together the three men were known as "les trois Horaces" (the three Horatii).

== Sources ==
- Biography of Corbineau @ the Ecole Supérieure de Guerre.
