= Élisabeth Françoise Armide de Rochechouart =

Élisabeth François Armide Durey de Morsan, countess of Rochechouart (1757–1805), daughter of a notable writer, was a French noblewoman involved in continued underground counter-revolutionary resistance to the French Revolution. These included an attempt to arrange the escape of Marie-Antoinette.

In 1775 she married count Jules de Rochechouart and they had two sons (Louis and Louis-Victor-Léon) and a daughter. She died in 1805, in exile.

== Biography ==
Durey was the daughter of Joseph Durey de Morsan, and Anne Geneviève François d'Albignac, of Castelnau. She was the niece of Louise Bernade Durey, who was the wife of Paris Louis Jean Bertier de Sauvingy. Through her mother, she was also the niece of Philippe François d'Albignac de Castelnau, bishop of Angoulême from 1784 onwards, who served as deputy in the Estates General of 1789.

In 1775, she married Jules de Rochechouart; a French general and military governor of Paris. This is likely where she began to become closer to Marie Antoinette.

After the imprisonment of the French royal family at the Temple in 1792, she took part in counter-revolutionary projects. She raised funds to acquit General Miranda, an agent of England, who was brought before the Revolutionary Tribunal for complicity with Dumouriez, a defector to the Austrian army. There are also reports that she made plans for Marie Antoinette to escape, though never coming to fruition. She was eventually exiled after some of her conspirators, whom she had connections to; were arrested. Her two sons managed to come with her, but her daughter was chased by the authorities and died in Paris. She became separated from her husband during this time.

Durey went to several countries before reunited with her sons in Switzerland, after she left them in the care of a couple in Caen. The family eventually came to Germany, where they made and sold bags to survive. She died in Kherson in 1805 and in poverty. Her son, Louis-Victor-Léon would later go onto become a general for the Royalists and Russians during the Napoleonic wars.
