= Pierre Daumesnil =

French general (1776–1832)

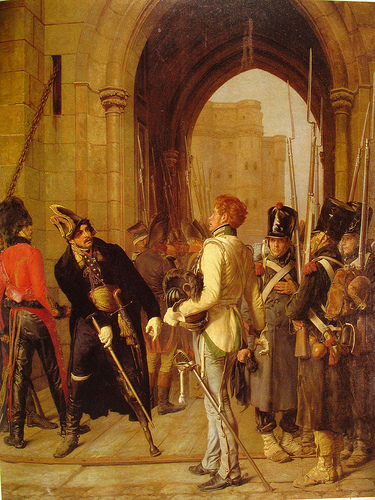
General Daumesnil: "I shall surrender Vincennes when I get my leg back".

Pierre Yrieix Daumesnil (French pronunciation: [pjɛʁ iʁjɛ domenil]; 14 July 1776 – 17 August 1832) was a French soldier in the armies of Napoleon during the first Empire and Restoration, eventually rising to the rank of brigadier general. He lost his left leg after he was wounded in the Battle of Wagram; it was replaced by a wooden prosthesis earning him the nickname jambe de bois ("wooden leg"). In 1812, he was assigned to the defense of the Château de Vincennes. Vincennes was then an arsenal containing 52,000 new muskets, more than 100 cannon and many tons of powder, bullets and cannonballs—a tempting prize for the Sixth Coalition when it marched on Paris in 1814 in the aftermath of the Battle of the Nations. However Daumesnil faced down the allies with the famous words "I shall surrender Vincennes when I get my leg back" (Je rendrai Vincennes quand on me rendra ma jambe, with a sort of polysemic pun in French on two possible meanings of rendre - "surrender" and "give back" - that is lost in translation). With only 300 men under his command, he resisted the Coalition until King Louis XVIII ordered him to leave the fortress.

Daumesnil rallied to Napoleon on his return, holding Vincennes once more against the large mass of Coalition troops. He managed to get a message to Royalist officer Louis-Victor-Léon de Rochechouart asking for help. He then surrendered and five months later he was retired by the Bourbons. When the Revolution of 1830 began, he was recalled and given the rank of lieutenant general. He died of cholera on 17 August 1832. Napoleon III awarded his wife a pension and the position of superintendent of the imperial house of Saint-Denis.

== Early years ==
Daumesnil was born in Périgueux on 27 July 1776, the son of Jean Daumesnil, a shopkeeper, and his wife Anne. He was the youngest of five children but little else is known of his early years. He seems to have been an active but mischievous youth, liked and admired by his peers, but intolerant of injustice and not particularly dedicated to his studies. At age seventeen, he killed an artilleryman in a duel and was forced to flee Périgueux, walking to Toulouse to join his brother, who was a cavalry trooper in the Army of the Eastern Pyrenees.

== Career ==
As it did for many young French officers, the French Empire offered Daumesnil the chance of advancement in his profession, as high military rank and honour were no longer the sole preserve of noblemen. He started his military career as a regimental trooper and rose up the ranks on his merits, before becoming a senior officer in the elite Régiment de chasseurs à cheval.

Daumesnil was seriously wounded on 19 August 1794. When he had recovered, he joined his regiment in Italy, was promoted, with the rank of brigadier, to the guides of General Bonaparte, and became a "maréchal-des-logis" on 28 October 1797. While serving in Egypt, in Napoleon's Egyptian campaign, Daumesnil threw himself on a bomb that had landed at Napoleon's feet; the bomb failed to explode, but the incident endeared him to Napoleon. In his early days in the guides, he was notorious for misconduct outside the field of battle. One day in Cairo, he was arrested and sentenced to death with two other guides for rebellion in the countryside after a fight with line officers.

Bonaparte promised him his life if he would ask for pardon, but the offer did not apply to the other two guides and Daumesnil refused. The next day, driven to the place of execution with his companions, the offer was made again, and he refused again. "[…] But, as he set out to join the other two condemned men, he was held back. The salvo laid flat his companions, under his eyes, and they led him back to his cell. Bonaparte had decided to save him."

As a member of the Legion of Honor he fought in the wars of Austria (1804), Prussia (1806) and Poland (1807). He also fought on the battlefields of Jena, Eylau and Friedland. He followed the Emperor to Spain in 1808. In the uprising of 2 May in Madrid, it was he who, at the head of the horse troops of the Imperial Guard, commanded the main charge of the French cavalry against the inhabitants of Madrid in the main street of Alcalá. He had two horses killed under him by enemy fire during the engagement.

Daumesnil joined the German army in 1809, took part in the battle of Eckmühl and was promoted to the rank of colonel-major on 15 June. He was created Baron of the Empire and was wounded in the left leg on the battlefield of Wagram on 6 July, barely having recovered from a spear that pierced his body at the start of the campaign. His leg was amputated in two operations over the course of the next few days, but he was fortunate enough to make a good recovery and retain his job under the Emperor. He was fitted with a wooden prosthesis and Napoleon showed his admiration by giving him a title and an annual endowment.

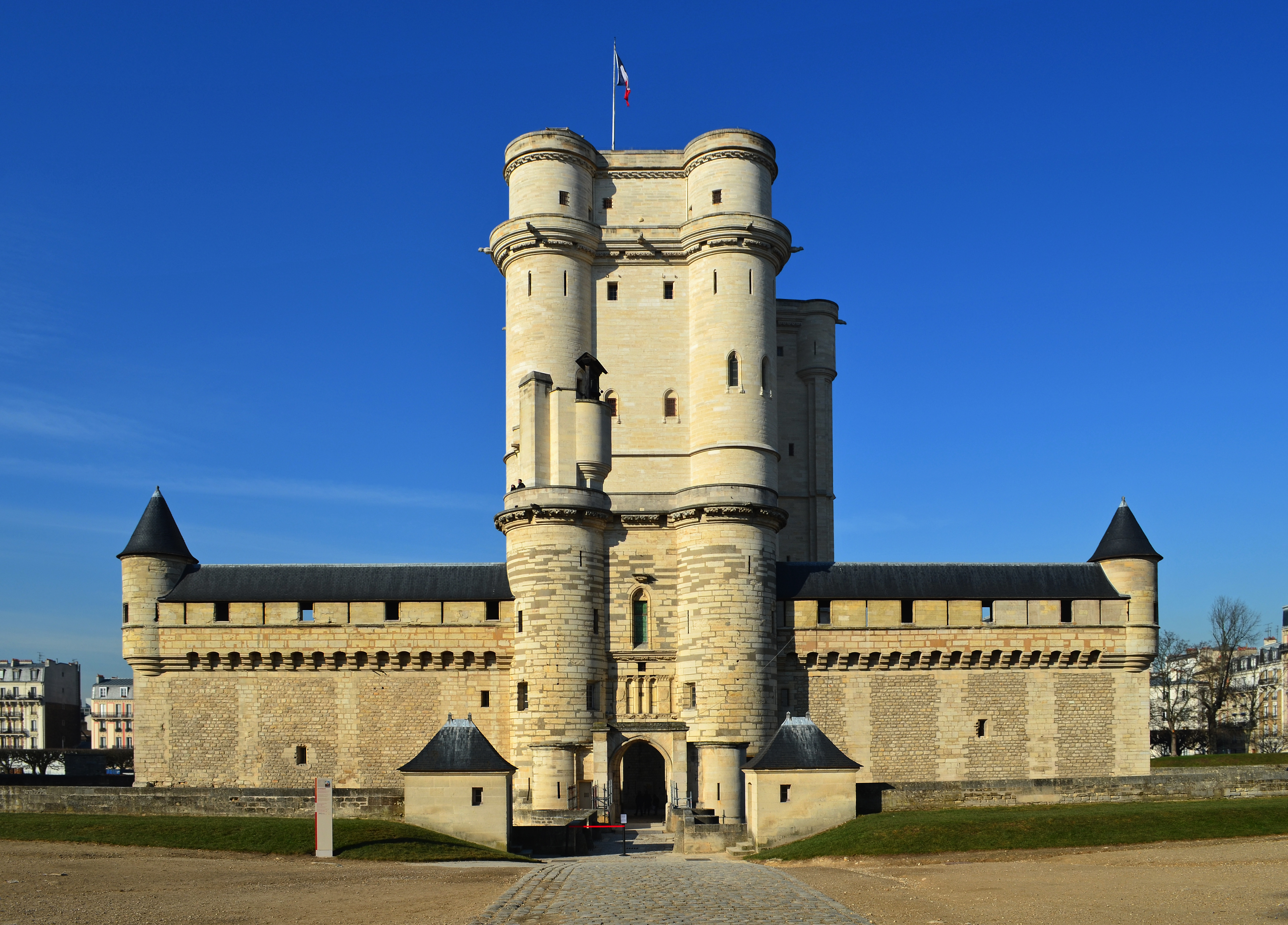
Donjon of the Château de Vincennes

He was promoted to brigadier general and commander of the Legion of Honour and was put in charge of the Château de Vincennes on 2 February 1812, and was invested on the 18th of the same month with the title of governor of Vincennes. The château was a fortress housing an arsenal in which, during the last four years of the Empire, up to 350,000 cartridges and 40,000 shell canisters were stored. It also housed a military barracks and a prison. Its importance was so great that the Emperor, in a special command, ordered General Daumesnil to stay there, never to sleep, nor to absent himself from the Château for a moment without specific orders to do so.

After the Battle of Paris in which the French troops were defeated, a treaty was signed on 30 March 1814 under which the Château de Vincennes was due to be handed over by the French Empire to the Sixth Coalition the following day. However, Daumesnil, the same night, sortied from the château with 250 horsemen, captured and brought in large quantities of cannon, rifles and ammunition. Subsequently, Paris was under the occupation of the Austro-Russo-Prussian allies for several weeks while Daumesnil still held the fortress. The allies protested by threatening the general. In Paris, the gaiety of his response to the Russian summons to capitulate is remembered: "I shall surrender Vincennes when I get my leg back!" He defended the building with the greatest courage against the Allied troops, refusing to surrender it after Napoleon's abdication on 6 April, stating that the contents of the arsenal belonged to France. With fewer than 200 men, he refused to surrender, insensitive to pressures and attempts at bribery, braving the siege of the fort for more than five months. He ended up capitulating only after being given orders to do so by Louis XVIII, but left the fortress still brandishing the tricolor.

After the restoration of the monarchy he was relieved of his position as governor of Vincennes, but his loyalty and diligence was rewarded by being given the Order of Saint Louis and the Château de Condé on 17 January 1815. The appearance of Napoleon on the coast of Provence later that year naturally returned the old soldier to all the ardour of his affections for the Emperor. However, faithful to his new oaths, he did not wear the national colours on the citadel of Condé until 22 March, that is, after the departure of the Bourbons. The evening Napoleon entered Paris, 20 March 1815, Daumesnil returned to Vincennes. After what is now called the Hundred Days, Napoleon capitulated and was exiled in Saint Helena.

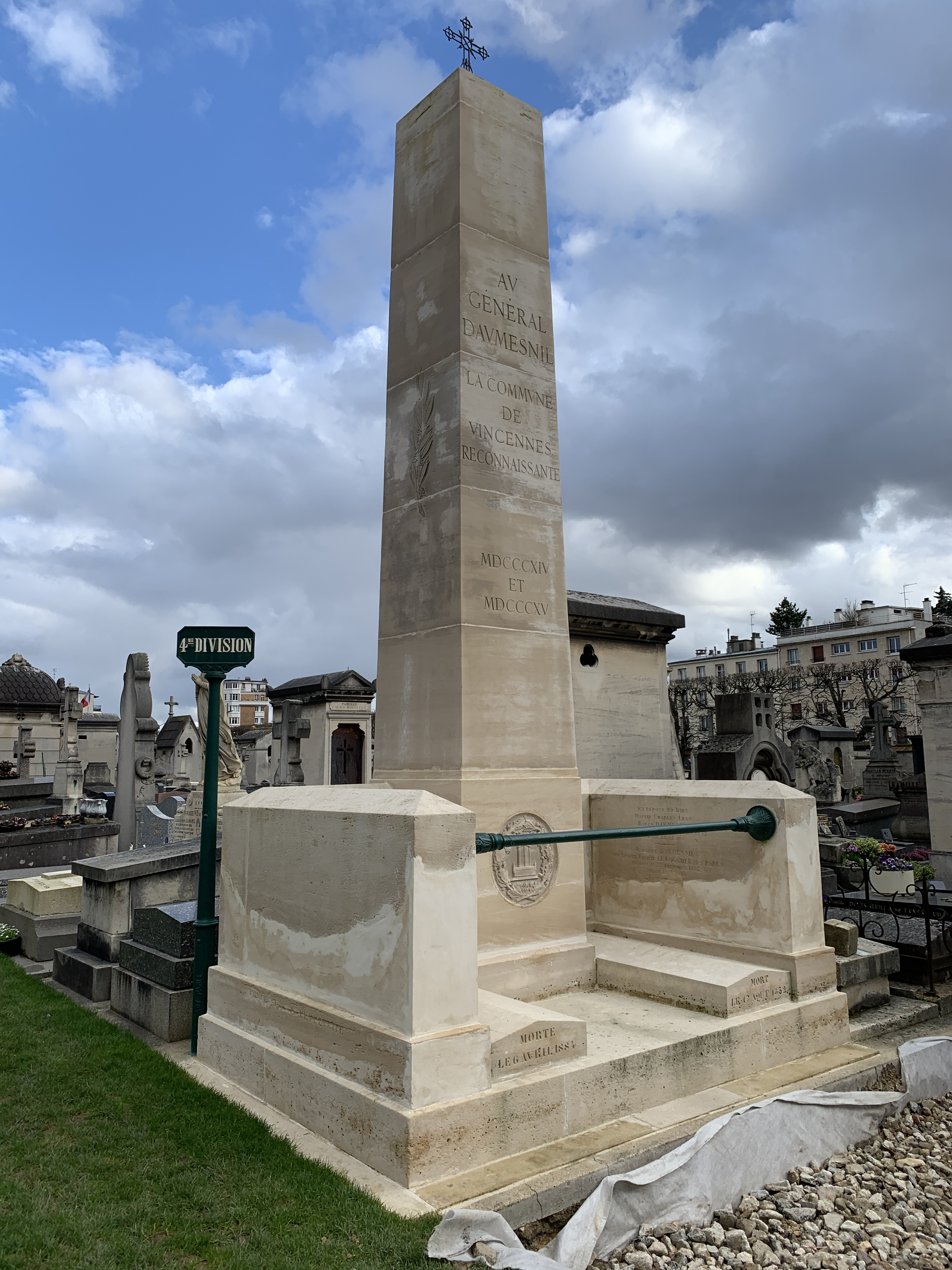
General Daumesnil's grave

Baron Daumesnil was living in retirement when the revolution of July 1830 broke out: one of the government's first acts was to give him back the command of Vincennes, of which the Restoration had stripped him. He entered it on 5 August, and was promoted to the rank of lieutenant-general on 27 February 1831.

Charles X's ministers were imprisoned in the keep of the fortress, while waiting for the Court of Peers to rule on their fate. When a crowd of enthusiastic revolutionaries demanded the heads of ministers under the walls of Vincennes, Daumesnil replied: "They only belong to the law, you will only have them with my life", and his energy was enough to calm the rioters. When it came to transferring the ministers to be remanded at the Chamber of Peers, there was fear that another attempt on their lives might be made. One of them was sick. Daumesnil, in full uniform, placed him at his side, in his carriage, and passed through the silent and threatening crowd that blocked his path. He moved towards the Luxembourg Palace, and delivered the prisoners safely to the palace commander.

== Private life ==
On 11 February 1812, Daumesnil married Léonie Garat, whom he had met only a month previously and who was only sixteen at the time. She kept a journal which provides much information on his life that is not available from other sources. They had three children and were a very affectionate couple. Baron Daumesnil died of cholera in Vincennes on 17 August 1832. The Chamber of Peers granted a pension to his widow.
