= Jean-François-Albert du Pouget =

French anthropologist

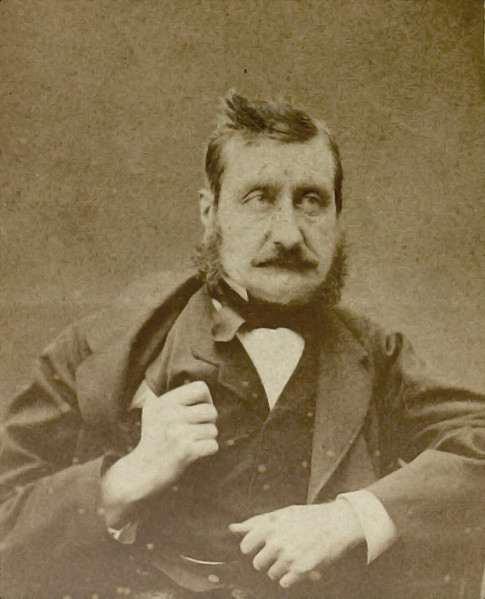
Jean-François Albert du Pouget de Nadaillac

Jean-François-Albert du Pouget, Marquis de Nadaillac (16 July 1818, in London – 1 October 1904, in Rougemont, Cloyes-sur-le-Loir) was a French anthropologist and palaeontologist.

== Biography ==
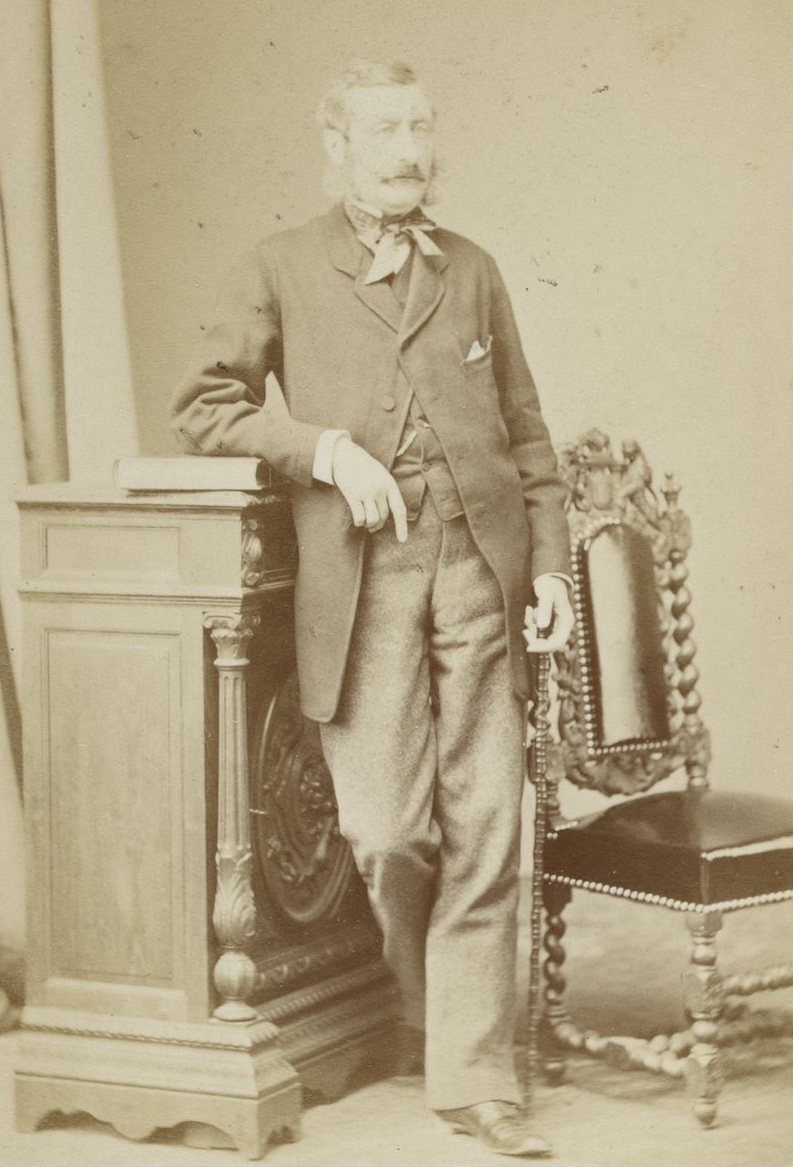
Jean-François Albert du Pouget de Nadaillac

The scion of an old French family, he devoted his earlier years to public affairs, and served in 1871 and 1877 respectively as Préfet of the Departments of Basses-Pyrénées and Indre-et-Loire. On completing his term of office he retired into private life and devoted himself to scientific research, chiefly in the lines of palæontology and anthropology, giving particular attention to American questions, upon which he was a leading authority. He had much to do with the exploration of the caves of southern France, being especially interested in cave drawings. He studied deeply the relation of science to faith, and was an earnest Catholic. He died at his ancestral chateau of Rougemont, near Cloyes, Department of Eure-et-Loir. He was a member of learned societies in every part of the world, including several in the United States, and he held decorations from half a dozen governments, besides being a chevalier of the Légion d'honneur. He was also a correspondent of the Institut de France. In 1886, he was elected as a member of the American Philosophical Society.

== Published works ==
- On Prehistoric America (in French), published in Paris in 1883, and in English in New York in 1884.
- Tertiary Man (1885)
- Decline of the Birthrate in France (1886)
- The Glacial Epoch (1886)
- Manners and Monuments of Prehistoric Peoples (Paris, 1888)
- Origin and Development of Life upon the Globe (1888)
- Prehistoric Discoveries and Christian Beliefs (1889)
- Most Ancient Traces of Man in America (1890)
- The First Population of Europe (1890)
- The National Peril (1890)
- The Progress of Anthropology (1891)
- Intelligence and Instinct (1892)
- The Depopulation of France (1892)
- The Lacustrine Population of Europe (1894)
- Faith and Science (1895)
- Evolution and Dogma (1896)
- Unity of the Human Species (1897)
- Man and the Ape (1898)
- Painted or Incised Figures...of Prehistoric Caverns (1904)

Most of these appeared first either in the journal of the Institut de France or in the Revue des Questions Scientifiques of Louvain and Brussels.
