= Armand Heine =

French Jewish banker and philanthropist

Armand Heine (1818-1883)

Armand Heine (1818 – 9 November 1883) was a Jewish banker and philanthropist born in Bordeaux, France, who later lived in his chateau and vineyard, Beychevelle in Bordeaux. With his brother Michel he founded the famous bank Armand & Michel Heine, in cooperation with Rothschild Frères & Co. in Paris, France, and New Orleans, Louisiana, United States. Armand was married to Marie-Amélie Kohn, daughter of a famous, very rich Jewish family, born in Bohemia.

Armand Heine died in 1883 at Beychevelle, leaving 22000 francs in his will for the funding of housing for the poor of Paris. You could read in the Paris newspapers of the time:

"Thanks to the generosity of the philanthropical society of the family of Michel and Armand Heine a whole series of new homes was built in Rue Jeanne d'Arc and Boulevard de Grenelle."
