= Château de Jumilhac =

Castle in Dordogne, France

Coordinates: 45°29′35″N 1°03′36″E

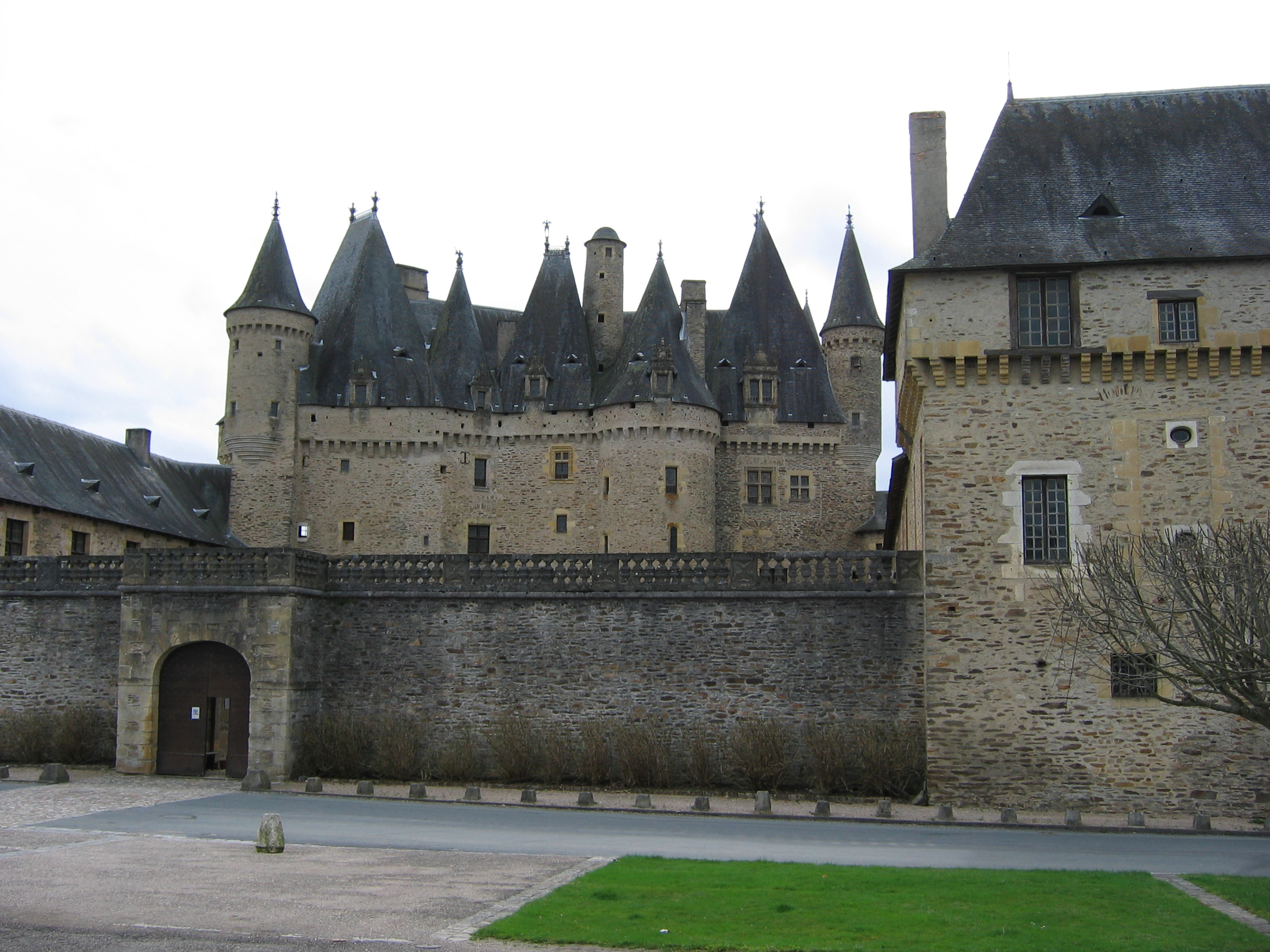
Château de Jumilhac

The Château de Jumilhac is a modified castle in the commune of Jumilhac-le-Grand in the Dordogne département of France.

== History ==
Its construction dates from the 15th, 16th and 17th centuries. The edifice is composed of the castle itself, constructed in the 15th century, and two wings added during the reign of Louis XIV. A covered porch and two arcaded walls link the ends of the wings and thus form an almost rectangular court of honour. At the rear façade is a terrassed lawn and an orangery. A parkland completes the site.

The central part was classified as a monument historique by the French Ministry of Culture in 1922, the right wing in 1923 and the left wing in 1924. The castle and gardens are privately owned but are open to the public.

== See also ==
- List of castles in France
- Marquis of Jumilhac
