= Michel Heine =

- Born: 19 April 1819; Bordeaux, France
- Died: 10 November 1904 (aged 85); Paris, France
- Occupation: Banker
- Spouse: Amélie Marie Céleste Miltenberger
- Children: Alice, Princess of Monaco; Paul Henri Heine; Isaac Georges Heine
- Parent(s): Isaac Heine; Judith Michel

Michel (Michael) Heine (19 April 1819 – 10 November 1904) was a French banker and businessman. Through his daughter, Alice, he was the father-in-law of Albert I, Prince of Monaco
