= Jumilhac-le-Grand =

- Commune
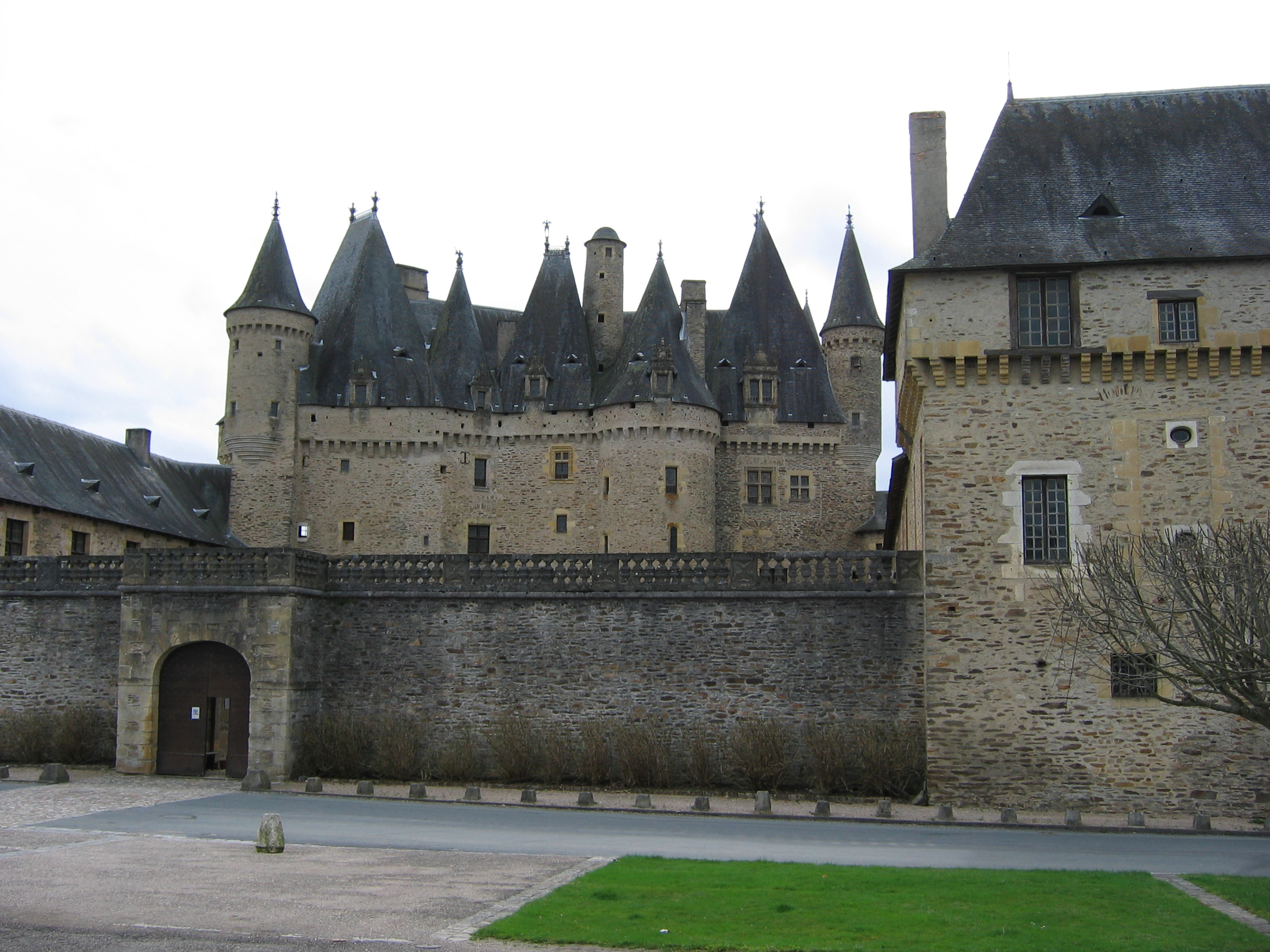
- Château de Jumilhac

- Coat of arms
- Location of Jumilhac-le-Grand
- Location within France Location within Nouvelle-Aquitaine
- Coordinates: 45°29′41″N 1°03′51″E
- Country: France
- Region: Nouvelle-Aquitaine
- Department: Dordogne
- Arrondissement: Nontron
- Canton: Thiviers

Government
  - Mayor (2020–2026): Annick Maurussane
- Area^{1}: 66.67 km^{2} (25.74 sq mi)
- Elevation: 274 m (899 ft)
- Highest elevation: 442 m (1,450 ft)
- Lowest elevation: 186 m (610 ft)
- Population (2023): 1,130
  - Density: 16.9/km^{2} (43.9/sq mi)
- Time zone: UTC+01:00 (CET)
  - Summer (DST): UTC+02:00 (CEST)
- INSEE/Postal code: 24218 /24630
- Website: jumilhac-le-grand.fr
- ^{1} French Land Register data, which excludes lakes, ponds, glaciers > 1 km^{2} (0.386 sq mi or 247 acres) and river estuaries.

Jumilhac-le-Grand is a commune in the Dordogne dėpartement in Nouvelle-Aquitaine in south western France.

The village lies on the road followed by Richard the Lionheart and on one of the many branches of the Camino de Santiago pilgrim route.

Jumilhac-le-Grand is a village of some 1,200 inhabitants in the northern part of the Dordogne. It is within the Périgord-Limousin Regional Nature Park, a protected area with a rich heritage. The landscape is one of hills and valleys and is perfectly suited to walks, bike-rides, and horseback riding. Its distinguishing features are green pastures with Limousin cows alternated by woods, orchards, rivers and lakes. In the rivers and lakes one can fish for trout as well as pike, perch and other coarse species.

The impressive 15th-century castle of Jumilhac is part of the Richard the Lionheart Route together with other neighbouring castles (Nexon, Coussac-Bonneval and Chalus).

On planet Mars, at the end of April 2021, a bedrock which was the target of LIBS analyses by the Curiosity rover was named after the village.

== Population ==
Historical population
Year	Pop.	±% p.a.
1968	1,654	—
1975	1,535	−1.06%
1982	1,411	−1.20%
1990	1,260	−1.40%
1999	1,213	−0.42%
2007	1,257	+0.45%
2012	1,232	−0.40%
2017	1,237	+0.08%
2023	1,130	−1.50%
Source: INSEE

== Sights ==
The Château de Jumilhac is classified as an historic building by the French Ministry of Culture. The castle was built in the 15th century; two wings were added in the 17th century. Its roofs have enhanced the reputation of the castle, also known as the "Black Pearl" of the Green Périgord for its distinctive black ridge tiles.

== See also ==
- Communes of the Dordogne department
