= List of French dukedoms =

List of French dukes

Heraldic depiction of a duke's coronet

This is a list of French dukedoms from the beginning of feudalism in the 9th century to the end of the French monarchy in the 19th century.

== History ==
The Duchies of France were founded in the 9th century by the Carolingian Kings and the princely members of their family who shared the Empire of Charlemagne which they had inherited by reorganizing all the Carolingian kingdoms of France into feudal duchies and counties vassals of the King of France.

=== Administrative districts ===
In the continuity of the administration of the Roman Empire, the various Germanic kingdoms set up districts of command entrusted to representatives of the aristocracy, appointed and dismissed by the sovereign. These dukes often had authority over several counties. The commands of the border regions took the name of "march" (French: marche) or "marquisate" (French: marquisat). The precise geography of these districts is difficult to establish, especially since their contours were very fluctuating. Many of these commands, having become hereditary, evolved into territorial principalities of the feudal type.

Name	List of Dukes	Creation Date	History of the title
Duchy of Bavaria	List	555	Annexed by Charlemagne
Duchy of Dentelin		6th century	Duchy of the Merovingian era which extended over Upper Normandy, Picardy and the south-western parts of Belgium (Flanders).
Duchy of Aquitaine then of Guyenne	List	632	Feudal duchy in 632 (Duchy-peerage in 1200) for the Merovingian dynasty; passed to the House of Boggide in 670. Extinguished in 768; reestablished in 845 for the House of Poitiers, passed in 893 to the House of Wilhelmide, in 918 to the House of Bellonide of Carcassonne, returned in 928 to the House of Poitou, passed in 932 to the House of Raymondine of Toulouse, returned in 950 to the House of Poitiers, passed in 1168 to the House of Plantagenet, in 1196 to the House of Guelph, returned in 1199 to the House of Plantagenets. Title extinct in 1204. Restored in 1259 for the House of Plantagenet, passed in 1399 to the House of Lancaster, in 1400 to the House of Valois, returned in 1415 to the House of Lancaster then in 1469 to the House of Valois. Title extinct in 1472. This title was reestablished in 1753 for a son of France but died out with his death in 1754. Raised as a courtesy title since 1972 by the elder branch of the Bourbons, held by Emmanuelle de Bourbon (b. 1960) since 1995.
Duchy of Alsace	List	662	Feudal duchy in 662 for the House of Etichonids, passed in 867 to the House of Carolingian, returned in 870 to the Etichonids, passed in 917 to the House of Wettin, in 926 to the House of Wetterau, in 948 to the House of Liudolfings, returned in 954 to the Wettins then in 973 to the Liudolfings and in 982 to Wetterau, passed in 1038 to the House of Salian, in 1048 to the House of Schweinfurt, in 1057 to the House of Rheinfelden then in 1080 to the House of Hohenstaufen. Title extinguished in 1268. The Duchy of Alsace was a German and not a French fief.
Duchy of Gascony	List	768	Feudal duchy in 768 for the House of Boggide, passed in 864 to the House of Wilhelmide, in 872 to the House of Pérez de Mittara, in 1032 to the House of Taillefer, in 1036 to the House of Poitiers, then in 1040 to the House of Armagnac. Title extinguished in 1042.
Duchy then County of Toulouse	List	778	Feudal duchy in 788 for the House of Wilhelmine. Title extinguished in 850, after which Toulouse became a County.
Duchy then County of Ponthieu	List	793	Feudal duchy in 793 for the House of Ponthieu. Title extinguished in 844, after which Ponthieu became a County.
Duchy of Septimania		817	Feudal duchy in 817 for the House of Wilhelmine. Title extinguished in 844.
Duke of Brittany	List	824 / 1547	Feudal county created in 824 for Nominoé, who titled himself King of Brittany in 840. Reestablished in 939 by the House of Poher, passed in 987 to the House of Rennes, in 1066 to the House of Cornouaille, in 1148 to the House of Perhoët, returned in 1156 to the Rennes, passed in 1196 to the House of Plantagenet, in 1203 to the House of Thouars, in 1221 to the House of Dreux, with Guy Mauclerc who officially took the title of Duke, disputed from 1341 to 1365, passed into the House of Montfort in 1365. Duchy-peerage in 1297, passed in 1514 to the House of Valois. Title extinguished in 1547 with the reunion to the crown of France. Never given as an appanage. Reestablished in 1707 for a son of France, extinguished with his accession to the Louis, Dauphin of France, in 1712. Raised as a courtesy title by the elder branch of the Bourbons from 1950 to 1975.
Duchy of Burgundy	List	877	Feudal duchy created in 877 (duchy-peerage in 1200) for the House of Nivelonne, passed in 943 to the House of Robertians, which later became Capetian, and in 1364 to the House of Valois. Title extinguished in 1477. Reestablished in 1682 for the House of Bourbon and two sons of France. Title extinguished in 1761. There was also a County of Burgundy, which became Franche-Comté. Raised as a courtesy title by the elder branch of the Bourbons since 2010.
Duchy of the Franks	List	687	The title of "Duke of the Franks" is more of an appellation, at least for the first holders. Feudal duchy in 886 for the House of Robertians. Title extinguished in 987.
Duchy of Normandy	List	911	Feudal duchy in 911 (duchy-peerage in 1200) for the House of Normandy, passed in 1135 to the House of Blois then in 1144 to the House of Plantagenet. Title extinguished in France in 1204 (the King of England retains the Channel Islands of which he is still the Duke in the 21st century). Re-established in 1331 for the House of Valois, passed in 1418 to the House of Lancaster then returned in 1465 to the House of Valois. Title extinguished in 1469. Re-established in 1785 for a son of France, but which became extinct when the holder, Louis Charles, acceded to the Dauphin of France in 1789.
Duchy of Lorraine	List	911	Feudal duchy in 911 for the House of Ydulfing, passed in 940 to the House of Liudolfinger, returned in 941 to Ydulfing, passed in 944 to the House of Speyer, returned in 953 to Liudolfinger, passed in 959 to the House of Wigéricide, in 1046 to the House of Lorraine then in 1431 to the House of Valois, returned in 1473 to Lorraine then passed in 1738 to Stanisław Leszczyński, former King of Poland. Title extinguished in 1766 and the duchy then became a province of France. Nevertheless, the title was raised by the dynastic head of the House of Lorraine, which became the Austro-Hungarian Imperial and Royal House of Habsburg-Lorraine, a direct and legitimate descendant of the reigning duke in 1737 and is sometimes still borne today. The Duchy of Lorraine was a fiefdom outside France.
County then Duchy of Bar (or Barrois)	List	951	Feudal duchy in 951 for the Duke of Upper Lorraine. Title extinguished in 1034. Reestablished in 1355 for the House of Mousson, passed in 1419 to the House of Valois, in 1480 to the House of Lorraine then in 1738 to Stanisław Leszczyński, former King of Poland. Title extinguished in 1766, Barrois followed the fate of Lorraine from then on. This title, however, has since followed the same destiny as that of Lorraine, to which it remains traditionally attached and is sometimes borne by the dynastic head of the Imperial and Royal House of Habsburg-Lorraine.
Duchy of Narbonne	List	12th Century	Feudal duchy from the beginning of the 12th century for the Counts of Toulouse. Title extinguished in 1249.
Duchy of Langres	List	1200	Episcopal duchy-peerage in 1200 for the Bishops of Langres. Title extinguished in 1801 with the 40th duke-bishop César-Guillaume de La Luzerne (1738–1821).
Duchy of Laon	List	1200	Episcopal duchy-peerage in 1200 for the Bishops of Laon. Title extinguished in 1801 with the 40th duke-bishop Louis-Maxime de Sabran (1739–1811).
Duchy of Reims	List	1200	Archiepiscopal duchy-peerage in 1200 for the Archbishops of Reims. Title extinguished in 1801 with the 45th duke-archbishop Alexandre-Angélique de Talleyrand-Périgord (1736–1821).

=== Feudal titles ===
France in 1477 Crown lands

In the late Middle Ages and the modern era, the duchy and peerage were attributed to smaller feudal groups, mainly former counties. The holders were most often princes of the royal family, under the rule of appanage which required that the extinction of the male descendants of the first holder led to the attachment to the royal domain of the duchy.

Name	List of Dukes	Creation Date	History of the title
Duchy of Auvergne	List	1226–1271; 1360–1521; 1528–1532; 1569–1574; 1773–1778	1st creation: for Alphonse of France, Count of Poitiers. 2nd creation: for John of France, passed in 1434 to the Dukes of Bourbon, confiscated in 1521 by the king. 3rd creation: for Louise of Savoy, but returned to the crown on her death. 4th creation: for Duke of Anjou in 1569. When he became King in 1574, the duchy was reunited with the crown. 5th creation: for Count of Artois, as 13th Duke, which he exchanged with the Crown in 1778.
Duchy of Bourbon	List	1327	Duchy-peerage created in 1327 for Louis I of Bourbon; passed to Louise of Savoy in 1527; then to the House of Valois in 1544. Reestablished in 1661 for the House of Bourbon-Condé. Title extinguished in 1830 with Louis-Henri-Joseph of Bourbon-Condé, 18th Duke. Raised as a courtesy title from 1950 to 1989 by the senior branch of the Bourbons.
Duchy of Orléans	List	1344	Duchy-peerage created in 1344 for Philip of France. Title extinguished with him and reestablished in 1392, passed in 1626 to the House of Bourbon, then in 1661 to the House of Orléans. Title extinguished in 1842 with Ferdinand-Philippe d'Orléans. Raised as a courtesy title by some of his descendants, including Jacques d'Orléans (b. 1941) since 1969.
Duchy of Anjou	List	1356	Created in 1356 for Louis of France, the duchy returned to the Crown in 1481. It was awarded in 1515 to Louise of Savoy, then returned to the crown upon her death in 1532. It was awarded as an appanage to the Duke of Anjou in 1566. When he became King Henry III in 1574, the duchy was once again reunited with the crown. In 1576 it became the new appanage of Francis, the King's brother, but when the latter died in 1584, it returned to the Crown. It was no longer awarded as an appanage until 1771, when it returned to the Count of Provence, who held the title as 16th Duke at the time of the abolition of feudal districts. Taken up as a courtesy title by Jacques de Bourbon; since 1946 held by the new senior branch of the Bourbons, borne by Louis Alphonse de Bourbon (b. 1974) since 1989.
Duchy of Berry	List	1360	Duchy-peerage created in 1360 for John of France. Title extinguished in 1584; reestablished in 1686 for the House of Bourbon. Title extinguished in 1820 with the Charles Ferdinand d'Artois, 14th Duke. Raised as a courtesy title by the elder branch of the Bourbons since 2010.
Duchy of Touraine	List	1360	Duchy-peerage created in 1360 for Philip of France, passed in 1423 to the House of Douglas, returned in 1424 to the House of Valois. Title extinguished in 1480; reestablished in 1527 for Louise of Savoy then returned in 1576 to the House of Valois. Title extinguished in 1584 with the Francis, 10th Duke. Raised as a courtesy title from 1981 to 1984 by the senior branch of the Bourbons.
Duchy of Château-Thierry	List	1400–1407; 1556–1802	1st creation: Duchy-peerage created in 1400 for Louis of France; 2nd creation: for the House of Bourbon. The title passed to the House of Valois in 1566; then to the House of Orléans-Dunois in 1627, and then to the House of La Tour d'Auvergne de Bouillon in 1651. Title extinguished in 1802 with Jacques Léopold de La Tour d'Auvergne, 11th Duke.
Duchy of Nemours	List	1404	Duchy-peerage created in 1404 for King Charles III of Navarre (1361–1425), passed to: the House of Bourbon in 1425, then to the House of Armagnac in 1462, then to the House of Grailly-Foix in 1507, then to the House of Medici in 1514, then to the House of Savoy in 1524, then to the House of Orléans in 1672. Currently held by Jean d'Orléans, 31st Duke (b. 1965) since 2019.
Duchy of Valois	List	1406	Duchy-peerage created in 1406 for Louis of France, passed to the House of Bourbon in 1630; then to the House of Orléans in 1661. Traditionally held by the eldest son of the Duke of Chartres, but current holder is Jean d'Orléans, 18th Duke (1965) since 2019.
Duchy of Alençon	List	1415–1970	Duchy-peerage created in 1415 for Jean I of Alençon; passed to the House of Bourbon in 1584; then to the House of Orléans in 1844. Title extinguished in 1910 with Ferdinand of Orléans. Taken up as a courtesy title by his son, Prince Emmanuel, from 1910 to 1931. Extinguished in 1970 with the death of his son, Prince Charles Philippe.

== Modern Duchies ==
The duchies of the Ancien régime were more complex than those of the medieval period. Essentially, the new duchies were not independent principalities and the ducal status was not definitively attached to the fiefs erected into duchies. The letters patent of creation contain clauses of succession which regulate the future of the duchies. In most cases, the rule chosen is that of succession by males: upon the extinction of the male descendants of the beneficiary of the erection into a duchy, the duchy reverts to its "previous state" lordship, county or other. Further distinction was made between dukes and peers, who sat in parliament; hereditary dukes, and patent dukes, whose title was not transmissible. In 1566, Charles IX issued an order that set forth that hereditary duchies would be reversible to the Crown in the absence of males heirs.

Some duchies have changed their name during their history: the Duchy of Thouars, for example, is often called the Duchy of Trémoïlle. Furthermore, it was not uncommon for certain fiefs to be erected into duchies under another name. Thus, the Duchy of Montmorency was re-created in 1633 under the name of Enghien, which remained attached to a lake in the Montmorency region, a lake which gave its name to the town of Enghien-les-Bains.

The title of duke, abolished during the French Revolution, was reestablished in 1806. Several dukes were created under the Empire and under the governments that followed. Under the Ancien régime, from the 16th century onwards, the title of Monsieur le Duc was used to designate the eldest son of the Prince of Condé. Duke Henri de Bourbon, who was a minister in 1723, is particularly well known in history under this name.

=== Duchies created by French sovereigns ===
Of the 218 titles created (141 under the Ancien régime, 33 under the First Empire, 33 under the Restoration, 7 under the July Monarchy, 4 under the Second Empire), only about forty remain today, the others becoming extinct.

Title	Date of Creation	Sovereign	Family	Current Status	Notes
Duke of Valentinois	1498	Louis XII	Borgia	1507	
Duke of Longueville	1505	Louis XII	Orléans-Longueville	1672	
Duke of Vendôme	1514	Louis XII	Bourbon-Vendôme	1712	
Duke of Angoulême	1515	Francis I	Valois-Angoulême	1696	
Duke of Roannais	1519	Francis I	Gouffier	1725	
Duke of Dunois	1525	Francis I	Orléans-Longueville	1536	
Duke of Chartres	1528	Francis I	Valois-Orléans	1910	
Duke of Guise	1528	Francis I	Lorraine-Guise	1830	
Duke of Estouteville	1534	Francis I	Orléans-Longueville	1707	
Duke of Étampes	1537	Francis I	Pisseleu/Brosse	1715	
Duke of Montpensier	1539	Francis I	Bourbon	1890	
Duke of Nevers	1539	Francis I	Albret	1798	Sold 1659
Duke of Beaumont	1543	Francis I	Alençon, Bourbon-Vendôme	1589	Merged in the Crown
Duke of Chevreuse	1546	Francis I	Lorraine	Extant	
Duke of Aumale	1547	Francis I	Lorraine-Guise	1897	
Duke of Valentinois	1548	Henry II	Poitiers	1566	
Duke of Albret	1550	Henry II	Albret, Bourbon-Vendôme	1802	Merged in the Crown
Duke of Beaupréau	1562	Charles IX	Scépeaux	1620	
Duke of Thouars	1563	Charles IX	La Trémoïlle	1933	
Duke of Uzès	1565	Charles IX	Crussol	Extant	
Duke of Mayenne	1573	Charles IX	Lorraine-Guise, Gonzaga	1738	Sold 1654
Duke of Épernon	1581	Henry III	Nogaret de La Valette	1661	
Duke of Joyeuse	1581	Henry III	Joyeuse, Lorraine-Guise	1724	
Duke of Rethel	1581	Henry III	Gonzaga	1826	Sold 1658
Duke of Hallwin	1588	Henry III	Hallwin	1656	
Duke of Montbazon	1588	Henry III	Rohan	Extant	
Duke of Ventadour	1589	Henry IV	Lévis	1717	
Duke of Beaufort	1597	Henry IV	Estrées, Bourbon-Vendôme	1689	
Duke of Aiguillon	1599	Henry IV	Lorraine-Mayenne	1632	
Duke of Rohan	1603	Henry IV	Rohan	Extant	
Duke of Sully	1606	Henry IV	Béthune	1807	
Duke of Fronsac	1608	Henry IV	Orléans-Longueville	1631	
Duke of Brissac	1611	Louis XIII	Cossé	Extant	
Duke of Grancey	1611	Louis XIII	Bonne	1613	
Duke of Lesdiguières	1611	Louis XIII	Bonne, Créquy	1711	
Duke of Bellegarde	1619	Louis XIII	Saint-Lary	1687	
Duke of Luynes	1619	Louis XIII	Albert	Extant	
Duke of Chaulnes	1621	Louis XIII	Albert d'Ailly	Extant	
Duc de La Rochefoucauld	1622	Louis XIII	La Rochefoucauld	Extant	
Duke of La Valette	1622	Louis XIII	Nogaret de La Valette	1661	
Duke of Richelieu	1629	Louis XIII	Plessis, Vignerot, La Chapelle-Jumilhac	1952	
Duke of Fronsac	1634	Louis XIII	Plessis, Maillé-Brézé, Bourbon-Condé, Vignerot	1822	
Duke of Puylaurens	1634	Louis XIII	L'Age	1635	
Duke of Saint-Simon	1635	Louis XIII	Rouvroy	1755	
Duke of La Force	1637	Louis XIII	Caumont	Extant	
Duke of Aiguillon	1638	Louis XIII	Vignerot du Plessis	1800	
Duke of Valentinois	1642	Louis XIII	Grimaldi	1949	
Duke of Coligny	1643	Louis XIII	Coligny	1646	
Duke of Gramont	1643	Louis XIV	Gramont	Extant	
Duke of Vitry	1643	Louis XIV	L'Hospital	1679	
Duke of Châtillon	1646	Louis XIV	Coligny	1861	
Duke of Coligny	1648	Louis XIV	Coligny	1657	
Duke of Estrées	1648	Louis XIV	Estrée	1771	
Duke of Tresmes	1648	Louis XIV	Potier	1670	Title changed to Duke of Gesvres
Duke of Arpajon	1650	Louis XIV	Arpajon	1679	
Duke of Lavedan	1650	Louis XIV	Montaut	1660	
Duke of Mortemart	1650	Louis XIV	Rochechouart de Mortemart	Extant	
Duke of Noirmoutier	1650	Louis XIV	La Trémoïlle	1733	
Duke of Villemor	1650	Louis XIV	L'Hospital	1663	
Duke of La Vieuville	1651	Louis XIV	La Vieuville	1689	
Duke of Rosnay	1651	Louis XIV	L'Hospital	1660	
Duke of Villeroy	1651	Louis XIV	Neufville	1794	
Duke of Créquy	1652	Louis XIV	Blanchefort-Créquy	1687	Also known as the Duke of Poix
Duke of Orval	1652	Louis XIV	Béthune	1678	
Duke of Roquelaure	1652	Louis XIV	Roquelaure	1738	
Duke of Verneuil	1652	Louis XIV	Bourbon-Verneuil	1682	
Duke of Fayel	1652	Louis XIV	La Mothe-Houdancourt	1657	
Duke of La Guiche	1652	Louis XIV	Valois-Angoulême	1654	
Duke of Coulommiers	1663	Louis XIV	Orléans-Longueville	1663	
Duke of Montaut	1660	Louis XIV	Montaut	1684	
Duke of Randan	1661	Louis XIV	La Rochefoucauld	1773	
Duke of Carignan	1662	Louis XIV	Savoy-Carignano		Sold 1751
Duke of Coislin	1663	Louis XIV	Cambout	1732	
Duke of La Meilleraye	1663	Louis XIV	La Porte-Mazarin	1738	
Duke of Noailles	1663	Louis XIV	Noailles	Extant	
Duke of Saint-Aignan	1663	Louis XIV	Beauvilliers	1828	
Duke of Montausier	1664	Louis XIV	Sainte Maure	1690	
Duke of Aumont	1665	Louis XIV	Aumont	1888	
Duke of Choiseul	1665	Louis XIV	Choiseul	1705	
Duke of La Ferté Senneterre	1665	Louis XIV	Senneterre	1703	
Duke of La Vallière	1667	Louis XIV	La Baume Le Blanc	1780	
Duke of Duras	1668	Louis XIV	Durfort, Chastellux	1838	title changed to Duke of Rauzan
Duke of Vivonne	1668	Louis XIV	Rochechouart	1688	
Duke of Gesvres	1670	Louis XIV	Potier	1794	
Duke of Charost	1672	Louis XIV	Béthune	1800	
Duke of Maine	1673	Louis XIV	Bourbon	1736	
Duke of Saint-Cloud	1674	Louis XIV	–	1801	held by the Archbishop of Paris
Duke of Lude	1675	Louis XIV	Daillon	1685	
Duke of Fontanges	1680	Louis XIV	Scoraille	1681	
Duke of Aubigny	1684	Louis XIV	Gordon-Lennox	Extant	
Duke of Humières	1690	Louis XIV	Crevant	1751	
Duke of Quintin	1691	Louis XIV	Durfort	1706	title changed to Duke of Lorges
Duke of Lauzun	1692	Louis XIV	Caumont	1723	
Duke of Boufflers	1695	Louis XIV	Boufflers	1751	
Duke of Harcourt	1700	Louis XIV	Harcourt	Extant	
Duke of Châteauvillain	1703	Louis XIV	Bourbon-Penthièvre	1821	
Duke of Villars	1705	Louis XIV	Villars	1770	
Duke of Lorges	1706	Louis XIV	Durfort	Extant	
Duke of Fitz-James	1710	Louis XIV	Fitz-James	1967	
Duke of Antin	1711	Louis XIV	Pardaillan	1757	
Duke of Rambouillet	1711	Louis XIV	Bourbon-Penthièvre	1783	
Duke of Hostun	1712	Louis XIV	Hostun	1755	
Duke of Rohan-Rohan	1714	Louis XIV	Rohan	1787	
Duke of Lévis	1723	Louis XV	Lévis	1734	
Duke of Alincourt	1729	Louis XV	Neufville	1732	
Duke of Lauragais	1731	Louis XV	Brancas	1852	
Duke of Enville	1732	Louis XV	La Rochefoucauld	1746	
Duke of Boutteville	1736	Louis XIV	Montmorency	1785	
Duke of Châtillon	1736	Louis XV	Châtillon	1762	
Duke of Fleury	1736	Louis XV	Rosset	1815	
Duke of Ayen	1737	Louis XV	Noailles	Extant	
Duke of Lesparre	1739	Louis XV	Gramont	Extant	
Duke of Broglie	1742	Louis XV	Broglie	Extant	
Duke of Gisors	1742	Louis XV	Fouquet	1821	
Duke of Coigny	1747	Louis XV	Coigny	1865	
Duke of Taillebourg	1749	Louis XV	La Trémoïlle	1749	
Duke of Mirepoix	1751	Louis XV	Lévis	1757	
Duke of Rochechouart	1753	Louis XV	Rochechouart de Mortemart	1771	
Duke of Choiseul-Stainville	1758	Louis XV	Choiseul	1785	
Duke of Gontaut	1758	Louis XV	Gontaut-Biron	1798	
Duke of Laval	1758	Louis XV	Montmorency-Laval	1851	
Duke of La Vauguyon	1758	Louis XV	Quélen	1837	
Duke of Villequier	1759	Louis XV	Aumont	1888	
Duke of Choiseul-Praslin	1762	Louis XV	Choiseul	Extant	
Duke of Picquigny	1762	Louis XV	Albert	1792	
Duke of Amboise	1764	Louis XV	Choiseul	1785	
Duke of Beaumont	1765	Louis XV	Montmorency-Luxembourg	1878	
Duke of Liancourt	1765	Louis XV	La Rochefoucauld	Extant	
Duke of Lauzun	1766	Louis XV	Gontaut	1793	
Duke of Saint Maigrin	1767	Louis XV	Quélen	1828	
Duke of La Vrillière	1770	Louis XV	Phélypeaux	1777	
Duke of La Tour d'Auvergne	1772	Louis XV	La Tour d'Auvergne	1849	
Duke of Croÿ-Wailly	1773	Louis XV	Croÿ d'Havré	1839	
Duke of Civrac	1774	Louis XVI	Durfort de Civrac	1787	
Duke of Chabot	1775	Louis XVI	Rohan-Chabot	1807	
Duke of Clermont-Tonnerre	1775	Louis XVI	Clermont-Tonnerre	Extant	
Duke of Guînes	1776	Louis XVI	Bonnières	1806	
Duke of Brunoy	1777	Louis XVI	Bourbon	1810	
Duke of Louvois	1777	Louis XVI	Bourbon	1800	
Duke of Guiche	1780	Louis XVI	Gramont	1836	
Duke of Narbonne Lara	1780	Louis XVI	Narbonne Lara	1834	
Duke of Polignac	1780	Louis XVI	Polignac	Extant	
Duke of Piennes	1781	Louis XVI	Aumont	1799	
Duke of Beuvron	1784	Louis XVI	Harcourt	1797	
Duke of Castries	1784	Louis XVI	La Croix de Castries	1886	
Duke of Cossé	1784	Louis XVI	Cossé-Brissac	1813	
Duke of Lévis	1784	Louis XVI	Lévis	1863	
Duke of Maillé	1784	Louis XVI	Maillé de La Tour Landry	Extant	
Duke of Choiseul-Stainville	1786	Louis XVI	Choiseul	1789	
Duke of Tavannes	1786	Louis XVI	Saulx-Tavannes	1845	
Duke of Amboise	1787	Louis XVI	Bourbon-Penthièvre	1821	
Duke of Bauffremont	1787	Louis XVI	Bauffremont	Extant	
Duke of Choiseul	1787	Louis XVI	Choiseul	1838	
Duke of Esclignac	1787	Louis XVI	Preissac	1873	
Duke of Avaray	1799	Louis XVI	Bésiade	1811	
Duke of Guastalla	1805	Napoleon	Borghèse	1832	
Duke of Dantzig	1807	Napoleon	Lefebvre	1820	
Duke of Rivoli	1807	Napoleon	Masséna	Extant	
Duke of Abrantès	1808	Napoleon	Junot	1982	extended 1869
Duke of Auerstaedt	1808	Napoleon	Davout	Extant	extended 1864
Duke of Bellune	1808	Napoleon	Perrin	1917	
Duke of Cambacérès	1808	Napoleon	Cambacérès	1881	
Duke of Castiglione	1808	Napoleon	Augereau	1816	
Duke of Conegliano	1808	Napoleon	Moncey	1901	
Duke of Dalmatie	1808	Napoleon	Soult	1857	
Duke of Elchingen	1808	Napoleon	Ney	1969	
Duchess of Frioul	1813	Napoleon	Duroc	1829	
Duke of Montebello	1808	Napoleon	Lannes	Extant	
Duke of Padoue	1808	Napoleon	Arrighi de Casanova	1889	
Duke of Parme	1808	Napoleon	Cambacérès	1808	
Duke of Plaisance	1808	Napoleon	Lebrun	1926	
Duke of Raguse	1808	Napoleon	Marmont	1852	
Duke of Rovigo	1808	Napoleon	Savary	1872	
Duke of Trévise	1808	Napoleon	Mortier	1946	
Duke of Valmy	1808	Napoleon	Kellermann	1868	
Duke of Vicence	1808	Napoleon	Caulaincourt	1896	
Duke of Bassano	1809	Napoleon	Maret	1906	
Duke of Cadore	1809	Napoleon	Nompère de Champagny	1893	
Duke of Feltre	1809	Napoleon	Clarke	1852	
Duke of Gaete	1809	Napoleon	Gaudin	1841	
Duke of Istrie	1809	Napoleon	Bessières	1856	
Duke of Massa	1809	Napoleon	Régnier	1962	
Duke of Otrante	1809	Napoleon	Fouché	Extant	
Duke of Reggio	1810	Napoleon	Oudinot	1956	
Duke of Tarente	1809	Napoleon	MacDonald	1912	
Duke of Dalberg	1810	Napoleon	Dalberg	1833	
Duke of Navarre	1810	Napoleon	Tascher	1858	
Duke of Albufera	1813	Napoleon	Suchet	Extant	
Duke of Decrès	1813	Napoleon	Decrès	1820	
Duchess of Saint-Leu	1814	Louis XVIII	Beauharnais	1837	
Duke of Civrac	1815	Louis XVIII	Durfort	1837	
Duke of La Châtre	1815	Louis XVIII	La Châtre	1824	
Duke of Ligny	1815	Napoleon	Girard	1815	
Duke of Cars	1816	Louis XVIII	Pérusse	Extant	
Duke of Damas Crux	1816	Louis XVIII	Damas Crux	1846	
Duke of Narbonne Pelet	1816	Louis XVIII	Narbonne Pelet	1901	
Duke of Périgord	1816	Louis XVIII	Talleyrand-Périgord	1883	
Duke of Tourzel	1816	Louis XVIII	Croÿ d'Havré	1844	
Duke of Avaray	1817	Louis XVIII	Bésiade	1941	
Duke of Bausset	1817	Louis XVIII	Bausset-Roquefort	1824	
Duke of Bayane	1817	Louis XVIII	Latier	1818	
Duke of Crillon	1817	Louis XVIII	Berton des Balbes	1870	
Duke of Doudeauville	1817	Louis XVIII	La Rochefoucauld	Extant	
Duke of La Luzerne	1817	Louis XVIII	La Luzerne	1821	
Duke of Mouchy	1817	Louis XVIII	Noailles	Extant	
Duke of Poix	1817	Louis XVIII	Noailles	Extant	
Duke of Sabran	1817	Louis XVIII	Sabran	Extant	
Duke of Sérent	1817	Louis XVIII	Sérent	Extant	
Duke of Talleyrand	1817	Louis XVIII	Talleyrand-Périgord	1968	
Duke of Wagram	1817	Louis XVIII	Berthier	1918	
Duke of Béthune-Hesdigneul	1817	Louis XVIII	Béthune	1823	
Duke of Fimarcon	1819	Louis XVIII	Preissac	1853	
Duke of Rauzan Duras	1819	Louis XVIII	Chastellux	Extant	
Duke of Bordeaux	1820	Louis XVIII	Artois	1883	
Duke of Decazes	1820	Louis XVIII	Decazes	Extant	
Duke of Blacas	1821	Louis XVIII	Blacas d'Aulps	Extant	
Duke of Fezensac	1821	Louis XVIII	Montesquiou	1913	
Duke of La Farre	1822	Louis XVIII	La Farre	1829	
Duke of La Roche-Guyon	1822	Louis XVIII	La Rochefoucauld	Extant	
Duke of Montmorency-Laval	1822	Louis XVIII	Montmorency	1826	
Duke of Rivière	1825	Charles X	Rivière	1890	
Duke of Gontaut	1826	Charles X	Montaut	1862	
Duke of Latil	1826	Charles X	Latil	1839	
Duke of Arenberg	1824	Charles X	Arenberg	Extant	
Duke of Caderousse	1827	Charles X	Ancezune	1865	
Duke of Damas d'Antigny	1827	Charles X	Damas d’Antigny	1829	
Duke of Caraman	1828	Charles X	Riquet	Extant	
Duke of Berghes	1829	Charles X	Berghes Saint Winock	1907	
Duke of Isoard	1829	Charles X	Isoard	1839	
Duke of Céreste	1830	Charles X	Brancas	Extant	
Duke of Crussol	1830	Louis Philippe I	Crussol	1837	
Duke of Tascher de La Pagerie	1833	Louis Philippe I	Tascher	1901	
Duke of La Mothe-Houdancourt	1838	Louis Philippe I	Walsh-Serrant	1842	
Duke of Marmier	1839	Louis Philippe I	Marmier	1947	
Duke of Estissac	1840	Louis Philippe I	La Rochefoucauld	Extant	
Duke of Isly	1844	Louis Philippe I	Bugeaud	1868	
Duke of Pasquier	1844	Louis Philippe I	Pasquier	1862	
Duke of Montmorot	1847	Louis Philippe I	Muñoz	1863	
Duke of Malakoff	1856	Napoleon III	Pélissier	1864	
Duke of Magenta	1859	Napoleon III	MacMahon	Extant	
Duke of Gadagne	1861	Napoleon III	Galléan	1925	
Duke of Audiffret-Pasquier	1862	Napoleon III	Audiffret-Pasquier	Extant	
Duke of Morny	1862	Napoleon III	Morny	1943	
Duke of Persigny	1863	Napoleon III	Persigny	1885	
Duke of Feltre	1864	Napoleon III	Goyon	2021	

=== Duchies created by French sovereigns on foreign territories ===
Title	Date of Creation	Sovereign	Place	Family	Current Status	Notes
Duke of Candale	1621	Louis XIII	England	Nogaret de La Valette	1658	Created for Henri de Nogaret
Duke of Cardona	1642	Louis XIII	Spain	La Mothe Houdancourt	1652	Created for Marshal Philippe de La Mothe-Houdancourt

=== Duchies created by foreign sovereigns on territories annexed by France ===
Title	Date	Sovereign	State	Family	Current Status	Notes
Duke of Aosta	1845	Charles Albert	Savoy	Savoy	Extant	Created for Amadeo I of Spain
Duke of Caderousse	1663	Pope Alexander VII	Holy See	Ancezune	1865	
Duke of Caumont	1789	Pope Pius VI	Holy See	Seytres	1870	
Duke of Chablais	1763	Charles Emmanuel III	Savoy	Savoy	1854	Created for Benoît-Maurice of Savoy
Duke of Crillon	1725	Pope Benedict XIII	Holy See	Crillon	1870	Created for François-Félix de Berton des Balbes
Duke of Doudeauville	1782	Charles III	Spain	Tellier	Extant	Created for François-César Le Tellier de Courtanvaux
Duke of Fortia	1775	Pope Pius VI	Holy See	Fortia	1826	
Duke of Gadagne	1669	Pope Clement IX	Holy See	Galléan	Extant	Except for title of Napoleon III which is extinct.
Duke of Geneva	1564	Emmanuel Philibert	Savoy	Savoy	1724	Created for Jacques de Savoie, Duke of Nemours
Duke of Isnards	1737	Pope Clement XII	Holy See	Isnards	1776	Created for Esprit-Toussaint des Isnards
Duke of Montpezat	1758	Pope Benedict XIV	Holy See	Trémolet	Extant	

=== Duchies created by foreign sovereigns on French territories ===
Title	Date of Creation	Sovereign	Place	Family	Current Status	Notes
Duke of Valentinois	1920	Albert I	Monaco	Grimaldi	Extant	Title granted in 1642 by Louis XIII to Honoré II

=== Other French dukedoms ===
Title	Date of Creation	Family	Current Status	Notes
Duke of Châtellerault	1515	Bourbon-Montpensier	Extant	Duchy-peerage created erected in 1515 on Châtellerault (department of Vienne) for Prince François de Bourbon, passed in 1527 to Louise of Savoy, returned in 1530 to the House of Bourbon, passed in 1540 to the House of Valois then in 1548 to the House of Hamilton, returned in 1563 to the House of Valois then in 1582 to the House of Bourbon and passed in 1730 to the House of La Trémoïlle. Reestablished in 1864 for the House of Hamilton. Since 1979, the title has been held by the 18th Duke, James Hamilton, 5th Duke of Abercorn (b. 1934), in Great Britain
Duke of Montmorency	1551	Montmorency	1951	Duchy-peerage created in 1551 on Montmorency (department of Val-d'Oise) for the constable Anne de Montmorency, passed in 1633 to the House of Bourbon-Condé, returned in 1689 and re-created on Montmorency-Beaufort (department of Aube) in the House of Montmorency then passed in 1864 to the House of Talleyrand-Périgord. Title extinguished in 1951 with the 17th Duke, Louis de Talleyrand-Périgord.
Duke of Graville	1563	Bourbon-Vendôme	1590	Duchy-peerage created in 1563 on Graville (department of Seine-Maritime) for Cardinal Charles de Bourbon. Title extinguished in 1590 with the 1st Duke
Duke of Enghien	1566	Bourbon-Condé	1569	Duchy-peerage created in 1566 on Nogent-le-Rotrou (department of Eure-et-Loir) then transferred in 1689 to Montmorency (department of Val-d'Oise) for Louis I, Prince of Condé. Title extinguished in 1804 with the 7th Duke, Louis-Antoine-Henri of Bourbon-Condé.
Duke of Mercœur	1569	Lorraine	1712	Duchy-peerage created in 1569 on Mercœur (department of Puy-de-Dôme) for Nicolas de Lorraine, passed in 1649 to the House of Bourbon. Title extinguished in 1778 with the 9th Duke, Charles-Philippe of France, future King Charles X.
Duke of Penthièvre	1569	Luxembourg, Lorraine, Bourbon-Vendôme	1919	Duchy-peerage created in 1569 on Penthièvre (department of Côtes-d'Armor) for Sébastien de Luxembourg, passed in 1608 to the House of Lorraine, in 1669 to the House of Bourbon then, in 1814, to the House of Orléans. Title extinguished in 1919 with the 12th Duke, Pierre d'Orléans.
Duke of Évreux	1569	Royal family	1584	Duchy-peerage created in 1569 on Évreux (department of Eure) for Prince François de Valois, heir to the Throne of France. Title extinguished in 1584 with the 1st Duke.
Duchess of Montargis	1570	Royal Family, Este, Lorraine	1574	Duchy created in 1570 in the town of Montargis (department of Loiret) for Renée of France. Title extinguished in 1575 with the 1st Duchess.
Duke of Saint-Fargeau	1574	Bourbon-Montpensier	1693	Duchy-peerage created in 1575 on Saint-Fargeau (department of Yonne) for Renée d'Anjou-Mézières and her husband François de Bourbon. Title extinguished in 1681 with the 6th Duchess, Anne Marie Louise d'Orléans, known as the "La Grande Mademoiselle".
Duke of Piney-Luxembourg	1576	Luxembourg, Albert, Clermont, Montmorency-Luxembourg	1878	Duchy created in 1576 (duchy-peerage created in 1581) on Piney (department of Aube) for François de Luxembourg, passed in 1620 to the House of Albert, in 1661 to the House of Clermont-Tonnerre then, in 1661, to the House of Montmorency. Title extinguished in 1878 with the 12th Duke, Anne Edouard Louis Joseph de Montmorency-Luxembourg, also Duke of Beaumont, Prince of Luxembourg and Tingry.
Duke of Ventadour	1578	Lévis	1717	Duchy created in 1578 (duchy-peerage created in 1589 on Moustier-Ventadour (department of Corrèze) for Gilbert de Lévis. Title extinguished in 1717 with the 5th, Duke Louis Charles de Lévis.
Duke of Elbeuf	1581	Lorraine	1825	Duchy-peerage created in 1581 on Elbeuf (department of Seine-Maritime) for Charles de Lorraine-Guise. Title extinguished in 1825 with the 6th Duke Charles-Eugène de Lorraine-Guise, also Prince of Lambesc.
Duke of Retz	1581	Gondi	1634	Duchy-peerage created in 1581 on Retz (canton of Machecoul) for Marshal Albert de Gondi. Title extinguished in 1679 with the 4th, Duke Pierre de Gondi. From 1722 to 1734, the future 4th Duke of Villeroy sat as a Peer of France with the title of Duke of Retz.
Duke of Biron	1598	Gontaut	1602	Duchy-peerage created in 1598 on Biron (department of Dordogne) for Marshal Charles de Gontaut. Title extinguished in 1793 with the 8th Duke, Armand Louis de Gontaut, also Duke of Lauzun.
Duke of Damville	1610	Montmorency	1719	Duchy-peerage created in 1610 on Damville (department of Eure) for Charles de Montmorency, passed in 1648 to the House of Lévis then, in 1694, to the House of Bourbon. Title extinguished in 1719 with the 4th Duke, Louis Alexandre, Count of Toulouse.
Duke of Châteauroux	1616	Bourbon-Condé	1830	Duchy-peerage created in 1616 from the previous County of Châteauroux by Henri II, Prince of Condé for Louis, Grand Condé on Châteauroux, passed to the crown in 1710. Title extinguished in 1830 with Charles X of France.
Duke of La Roche-Guyon	1621	Silly	Extant	Duchy-peerage created in 1621 on La Roche-Guyon (department of Val-d'Oise) for François de Silly, passed in 1643 to the House of Plessis-Liancourt then, in 1679, to the House of La Rochefoucauld. Since 2013, title held by Guy-Antoine de La Rochefoucauld, 6th Duke of La Roche-Guyon (b. 1958).
Duke of Villars-Brancas	1627	Brancas	1858	Duchy created in 1627 (duchy-peerage created in 1652) on Villars (department of Vaucluse) for Georges de Brancas.
Duke of Châtelet	1777	Châtelet	1793	Duchy created in 1777 for Louis Marie Florent du Châtelet. Title extinguished in 1793 with the 1st Duke.

== See also ==
- French nobility
- Dukes in France
- Peerage of France
- List of French peers
- List of French peerages
- List of French marquesses
