= An Incident at the Opera Ball on Mardi Gras in 1778 =

Royal scandal in France

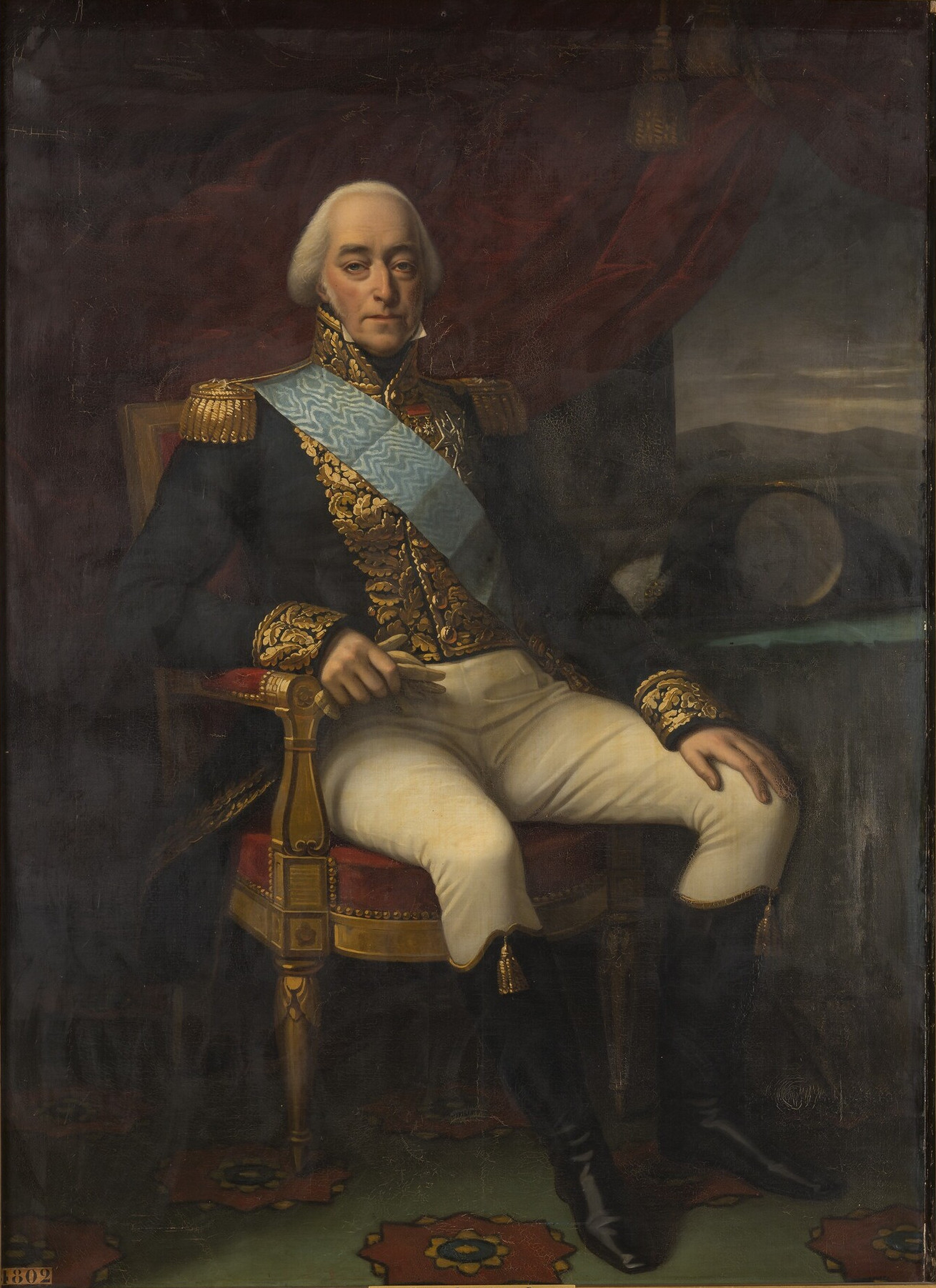
Challenged the Comte d'Artois to the duel: Louis VI Henri Joseph de Bourbon-Condé, Duc de Bourbon, portrayed by Charles Boulanger de Boisfremont between 1818 and 1824 as Prince de Condé.

An Incident at the Opera Ball on Mardi Gras in 1778 was an affair that almost led to a serious duel within the Royal Family of France. The two protagonists were Charles-Philippe de France, Comte d'Artois, – who became Charles X, King of France, in 1824 – and Louis VI Henri Joseph de Bourbon-Condé, Duc de Bourbon. They belonged to the immediate and extended royal family, respectively. Because of the duel that was ultimately staged, it was described by those in the know as a comedy in several acts.

"Pray, 'tis but a small comedy for the Comte d'Artois to perform."

— Amused comment by Pierre Victor, Baron de Besenval, in conversation with Alexandre-Charles-Emmanuel de Crussol, Chevalier de Crussol, on 15 March 1778, the day before the duel

The details of this affair, which attracted considerable public attention at the time, are known primarily through the personal notes of Pierre Victor, Baron de Besenval, a Swiss military officer in French service, who was the most influential Swiss ever to serve at the French court. At the request of the Baron de Besenval's illegitimate son Joseph-Alexandre Pierre, Vicomte de Ségur, Jean-Baptiste-Denis Després, formerly secretary to both men, sorted the late baron's literary estate, including his memoirs, which the Vicomte de Ségur published between 1805 and 1806.

As a close confidant of King Louis XVI and Queen Marie-Antoinette, the Baron de Besenval acted, on the one hand, as a mediator and advisor in this affair. On the other hand, his residence in Paris, the Hôtel de Besenval, also played a role in this dispute within the royal family. According to his memoirs, the Baron de Besenval wrote his account of the events surrounding the Incident at the Opera Ball on Mardi Gras in that same year.

== The Opera Ball on Mardi Gras ==
On Mardi Gras, 3 March 1778, the courtly society of Versailles gathered for the traditional opera ball, a masquerade held at the Théâtre du Palais-Royal. Because of the masking, a masked ball always offers the opportunity to guess who is hiding behind which mask, and thus who appears at the ball with whom. They also provide a chance to appear in the company of people who might not otherwise be invited to courtly events, thereby heightening both the excitement and the curiosity of other guests. That is exactly what happened at this ball, where most attendees were masked.

=== The king's brother and his mistress ===
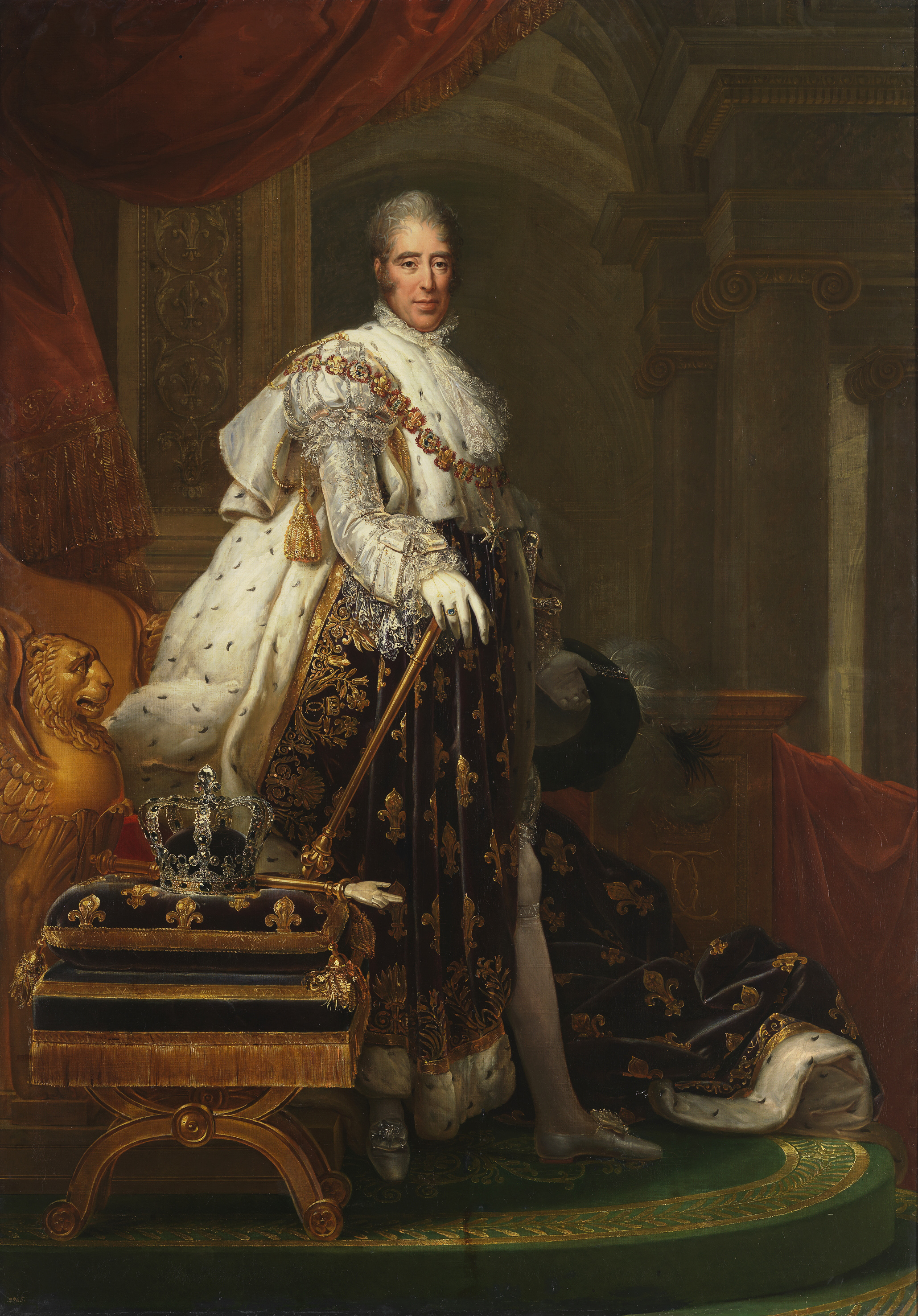
Was challenged to the duel by the Duc de Bourbon: Charles-Philippe de France, Comte d'Artois, portrayed by François Gérard in 1825 as Charles X, King of France.

Louise-Marie-Thérèse-Bathilde d'Orléans, Duchesse de Bourbon, née Princesse du sang de France and thus a member of the extended royal family, recognised Charles-Philippe de France, Comte d'Artois, the king's brother. He was accompanied by his mistress Anne-Michelle-Dorothée de Roncherolles, Comtesse de Canillac (1753–1844), whom the Duchesse de Bourbon also recognised, although both she and the Comte d'Artois were masked. At that time, the Comtesse de Canillac served as a lady-in-waiting to Élisabeth, Princesse de France, the king's unmarried sister.

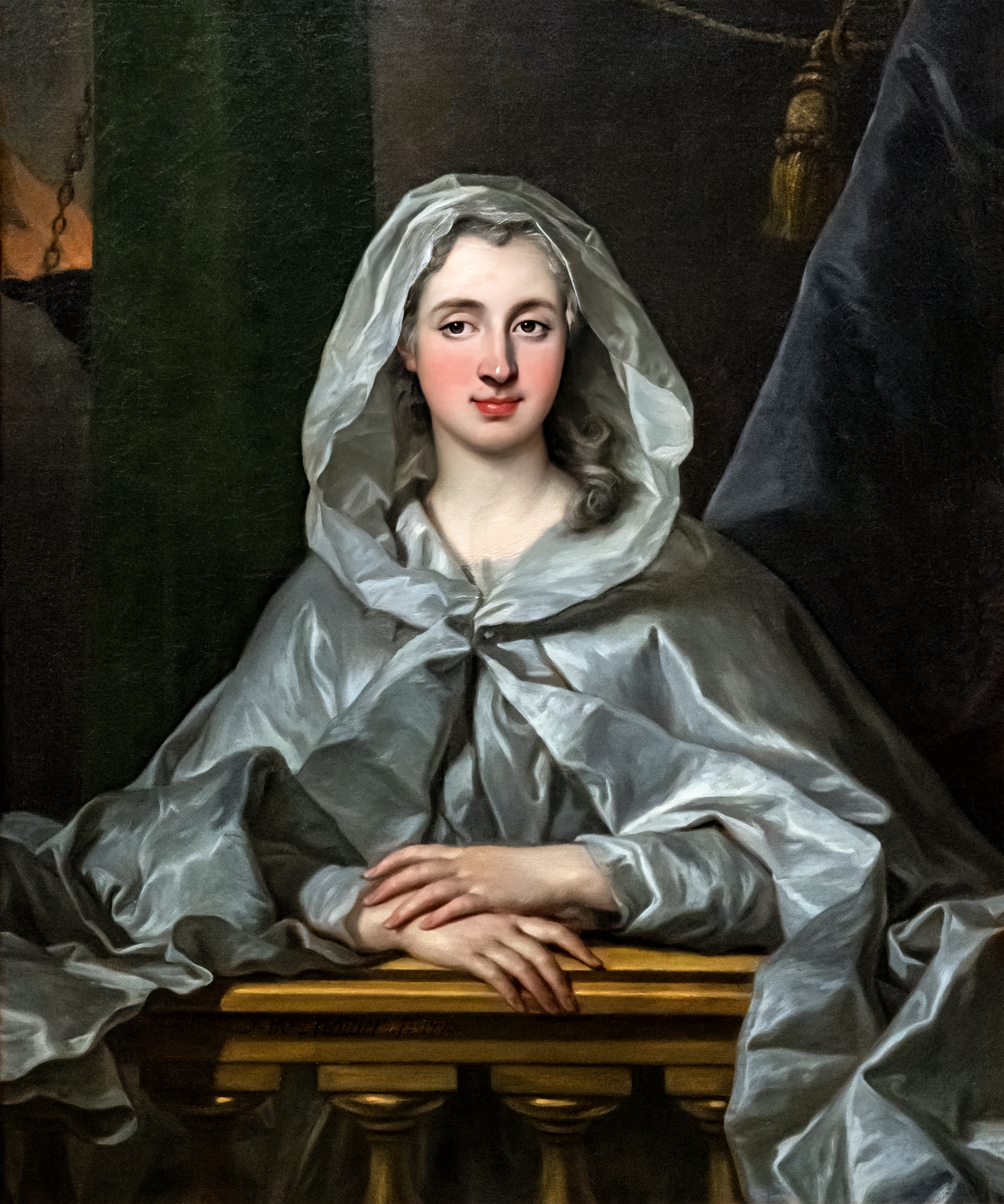
Provoked the duel within the royal family: Louise-Marie-Thérèse-Bathilde d'Orléans, Duchesse de Bourbon, née Princesse du sang de France, wife of the Duc de Bourbon, portrayed by Louis-Michel van Loo around 1770.

The Comte d'Artois and the Comtesse de Canillac noticed that they were being watched by the Duchesse de Bourbon, who, despite also being masked, was recognisable by her behaviour. To escape her scrutiny, they separated in the crowd in order to avoid an embarrassing situation that might have escalated into a scandal, as they were both married at the time – to Marie-Thérèse de Savoie and Ignace de Montboissier-Beaufort-Canillac, Comte de Canillac (1750–1809), respectively. In addition, the Comtesse de Canillac had once served as Dame de compagnie (Lady companion) to the Duchesse de Bourbon until the latter's husband, the Duc de Bourbon, became enamoured of the young and attractive comtesse. When the Duchesse de Bourbon discovered this, she dismissed her. Despite the dismissal, the affair could not be kept secret and soon became known at court. The duchesse was embarrassed by these events, while other members of the nobility and the courtiers were amused. Due to their prior history, the Duchesse de Bourbon was displeased to see the Comtesse de Canillac at the masquerade. She also considered it an affront that the Comte d'Artois had brought the comtesse with him following their earlier dispute. Determined to confront him, she sat down beside the Comte d'Artois when he took his seat. After exchanging a few words, during which he did not identify himself, the still-masked duchesse, in irritation, tore the false beard from his face with such force that the straps attaching it to the mask broke, revealing his identity. Furious at the embarrassment, the Comte d'Artois then tore off the duchesse's mask with equal force, causing her to weep. Without a word, he then withdrew.

== The demand for satisfaction and the plan of the Baron de Besenval ==
The next day, 4 March, the Duchesse de Bourbon's brother, Louis-Philippe d'Orléans, Duc de Chartres, came to visit her. When she told him what had happened at the opera ball, he was amused. That same evening, she entertained a large number of guests at dinner and recounted the Comte d'Artois' behaviour. Embellished with lies and half-truths, her story provoked the reaction she had hoped for from her guests: horror and indignation. Accordingly, the affair took its course.

The entire royal court discussed the affair due to the embellishments with which the Duchesse de Bourbon had enhanced the story. The story also reached the ears of her father-in-law, Louis V Joseph de Bourbon-Condé, Prince de Condé, who decided to inform the king. The king, for his part, entrusted the Ministre d'État, Jean-Frédéric Phélypeaux, Comte de Maurepas, with the matter, instructing him to prevent a scandal. The Comte de Maurepas, in turn, consulted the Baron de Besenval for advice.

=== Pierre Victor, Baron de Besenval: Advisor, tactician, string puller ===
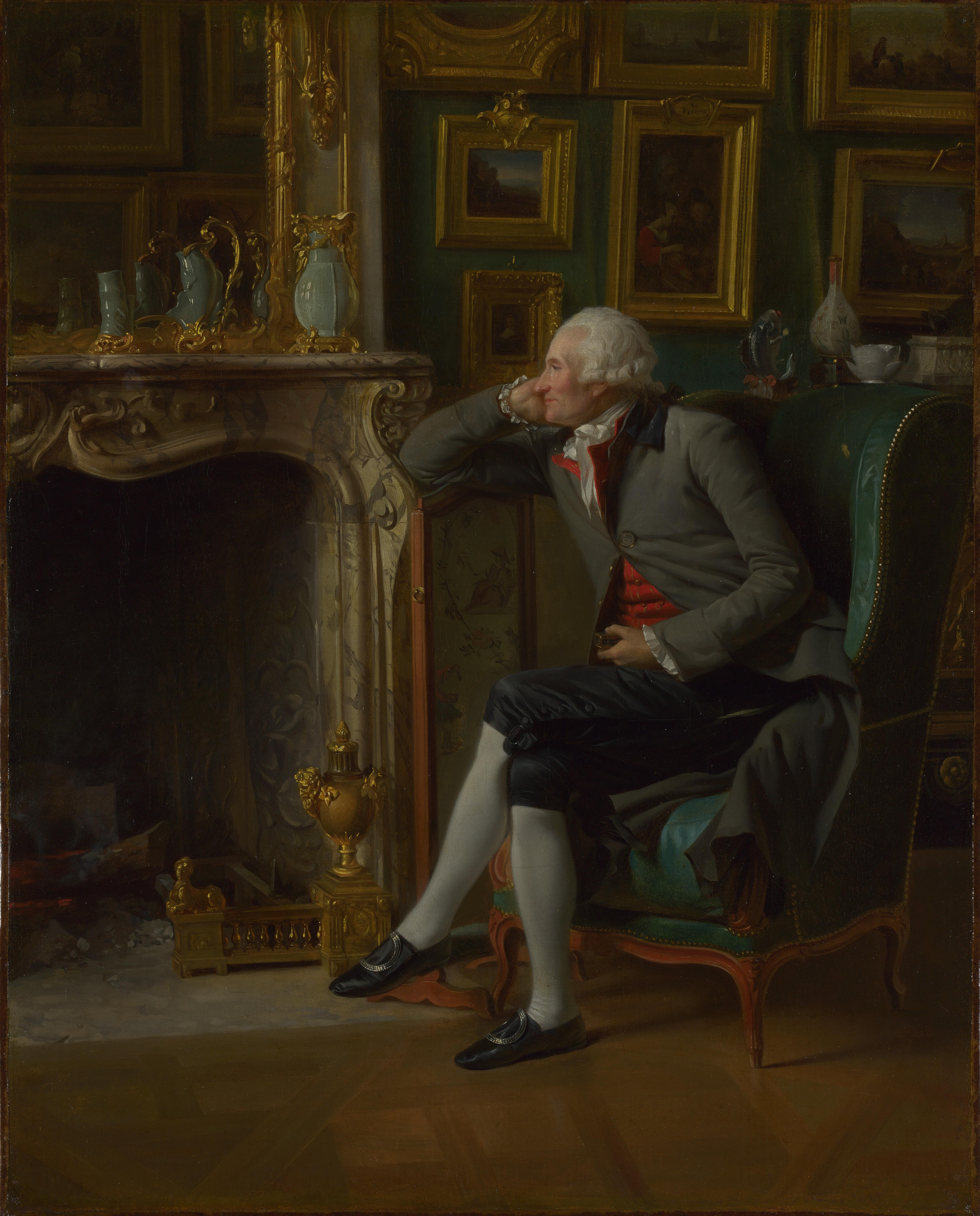
Helped to turn the duel into a comedy in several acts: Pierre Victor, Baron de Besenval, portrayed by Henri-Pierre Danloux in his Salon de compagnie in 1791 at his residence in Paris, the Hôtel de Besenval.

On 8 March, Pierre Victor, Baron de Besenval, arrived at the Château de Versailles, where he met the Comte d'Artois. The baron told him that the Duchesse de Bourbon had behaved in a reprehensible manner; however, he added that he should not have allowed himself to be provoked by her behaviour. The Comte d'Artois agreed.

Back in Paris, the Baron de Besenval noticed that public opinion in this affair was turning against the Comte d'Artois. Women in particular demanded that the Duchesse de Bourbon's husband, the Duc de Bourbon, challenge him to a duel. The baron decided to take informal action. He informed Yolande Martine Gabrielle de Polastron, Duchesse de Polignac, the queen's favourite. When he spoke with her, the courtier François-Henri de Franquetot de Coigny, Duc de Coigny, was also present. The Baron de Besenval stated that the king must act quickly before the affair escalated into a true scandal that could harm the reputation of the royal family. It was therefore suggested that the king should rebuke both parties – the Duchesse de Bourbon and the Comte d'Artois – and the Duc de Coigny and the Duchesse de Polignac agreed. The Duchesse de Polignac immediately informed the queen, who in turn informed the king. It was thus decided to put the baron's idea into practice, and the entire procedure was coordinated by the Ministre d'État, Jean-Frédéric Phélypeaux, Comte de Maurepas.

On Saturday morning, 14 March, the king gathered the Prince de Condé, the Duc and Duchesse de Bourbon, as well as the Comte d'Artois, in his study at the Château de Versailles. He made it clear that he wished to let bygones be bygones and that the affair would no longer be discussed. When the Duc de Bourbon attempted to speak, the king abruptly interrupted him and firmly instructed him to remain silent. Everyone then left the room irritated, frustrated and dissatisfied. The matter was not yet over.

On Sunday morning, 15 March, the Baron de Besenval took part in the Lever du Roi at the Château de Versailles, where he noticed the queen's secretary, Pierre-Dominique Berthollet (1722–1791), known as Campan, making signs for him to follow unobtrusively. As they proceeded through the many corridors of the château, Campan explained that the queen wished to meet him in confidence. Their first attempt failed because they arrived too late at the agreed location. At 3 p.m., however, the meeting between the queen and the baron finally took place in an inconspicuous side room of the Château de Versailles.

=== A royal duel – by coincidence ===
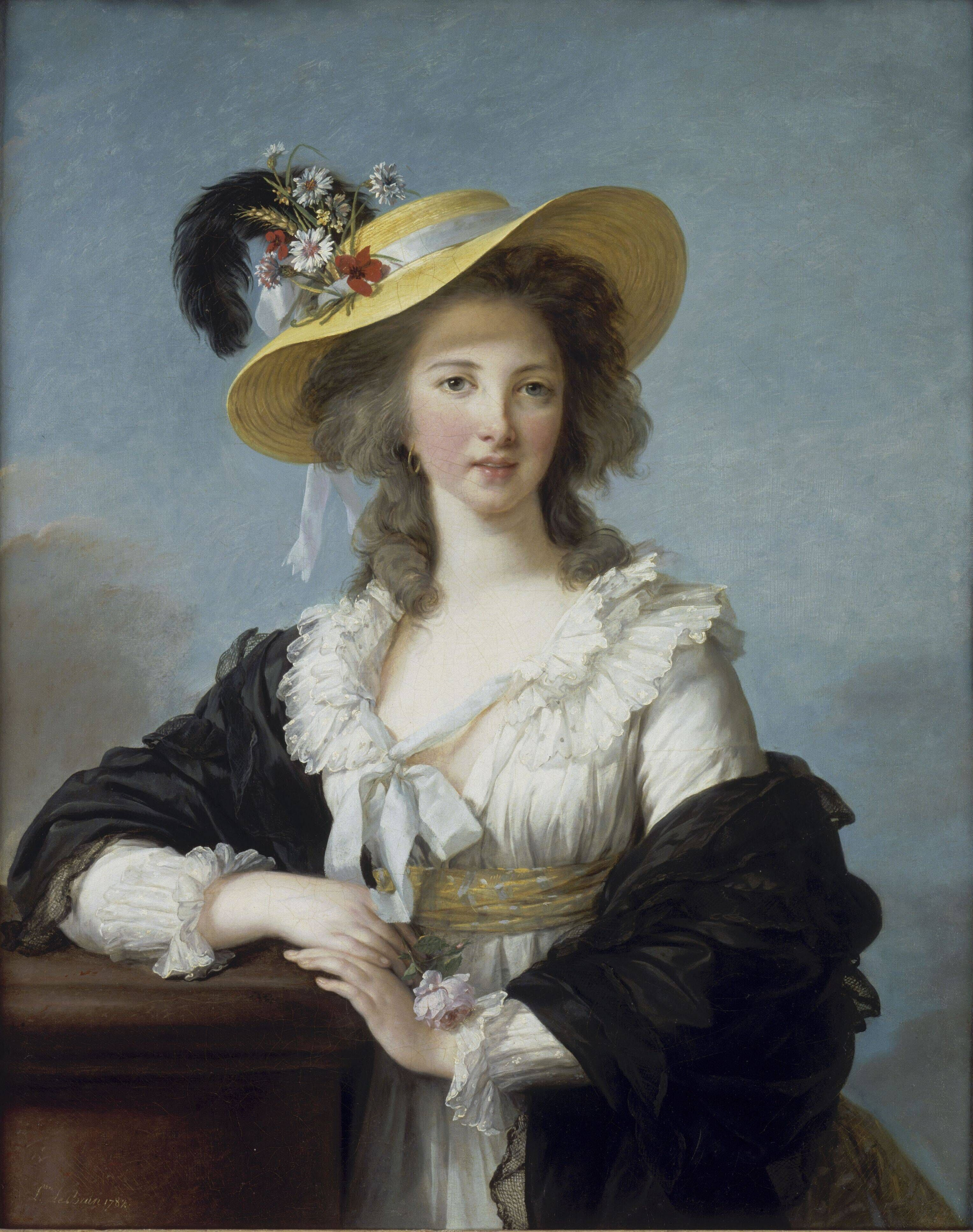
Kept the queen informed about the duel: Yolande Martine Gabrielle de Polastron, Duchesse de Polignac, portrayed by Élisabeth Vigée Le Brun in 1782.

The queen quickly got to the point. The situation surrounding the Incident at the Opera Ball on Mardi Gras remained unsatisfactory: the parties involved were still hostile to one another, and the outraged public clamoured for a duel between the Duc de Bourbon and the Comte d'Artois. When asked for his advice, the Baron de Besenval proposed that the duel demanded by the public be reduced to a more symbolic encounter – one in which no one would be seriously injured. He further suggested that the meeting between the two opponents should appear accidental, thereby removing any sense of official sanction. In this way, all parties could save face while also satisfying public opinion. The queen agreed to the baron's plan, adding that it would likely be in the king's interest as well, even though he had disapproved of – and forbidden – any duel. She left the further arrangements to the baron, who stated that he intended to inform the Comte d'Artois' captain of the guard, Alexandre-Charles-Emmanuel de Crussol, Chevalier de Crussol, as well as several other courtiers. Accordingly, the Baron de Besenval arranged a meeting with the Chevalier de Crussol, the Comte de Vaudreuil and the Duc de Polignac, all of whom agreed to the plan.

"It was, in effect, this very denomination of 'the royal family' which formed the great difficulty; for the kings would on no account suffer the princes to be deemed a part thereof, whilst the princes, on their side, were unceasingly desirous to be comprehended within it."

— Pierre Victor, Baron de Besenval, on the difficult relations between royal families and their extended relatives

=== A script full of planned coincidences ===
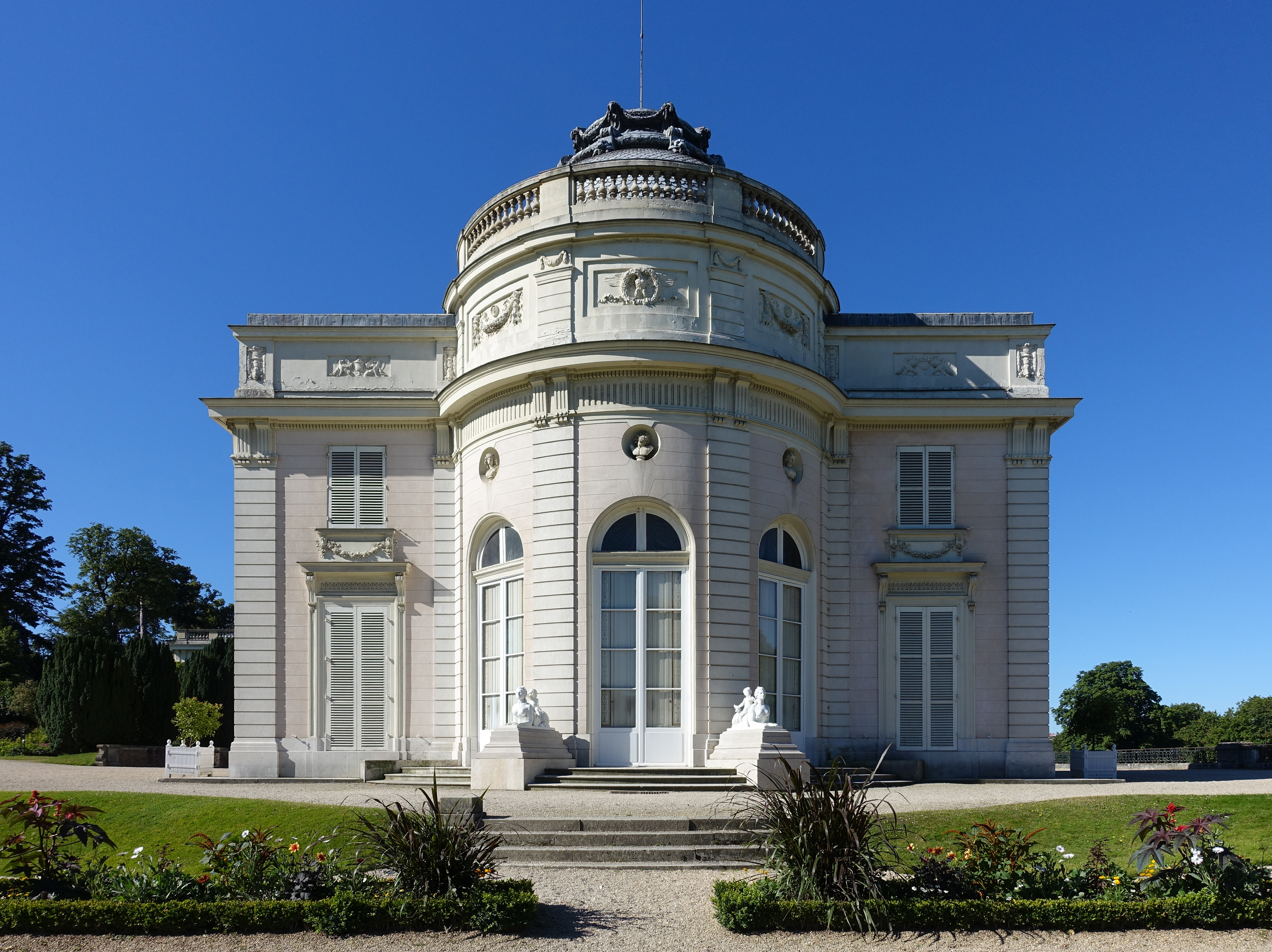
Served as a reference point for the duel scene: The Château de Bagatelle, the château of Charles-Philippe de France, Comte d'Artois, in the Bois de Boulogne (garden façade).

The Baron de Besenval informed the Comte d'Artois of the plan and that the Duc de Bourbon would also be informed – through targeted indiscretions – so that he could react if he wished. The plan was as follows: on Monday morning, 16 March, at 10 a.m., the Comte d'Artois was to set off, as was his custom, for his château, the Château de Bagatelle in the Bois de Boulogne, accompanied only by his captain of the guard, the Chevalier de Crussol. Through deliberate indiscretions, the Duc de Bourbon would learn of this and could then confront the Comte d'Artois in the Bois de Boulogne. Should the Duc de Bourbon not take advantage of this opportunity for satisfaction, a second would be offered by letting him know that the Comte d'Artois would dine that day with the Baron de Besenval at his town house in Paris, the Hôtel de Besenval. The Duc de Bourbon would inevitably pass by the baron's residence, as it was practically around the corner from his own town house, the Palais Bourbon. If he failed to seize this second opportunity as well, no one could blame the Comte d'Artois for not having given him the chance to do so. The Comte d'Artois agreed to the plan.

"I shall come to your house for dinner, and you may be assured it will give me the greatest pleasure."

— Charles-Philippe de France, Comte d'Artois, accepting the Baron de Besenval's inviation for dinner, after initially being skeptical that he should go for dinner at the Hôtel de Besenval, since he didn't want to drag the baron any deeper into the affair

== Monday, 16 March 1778: The duel in the Bois de Boulogne ==
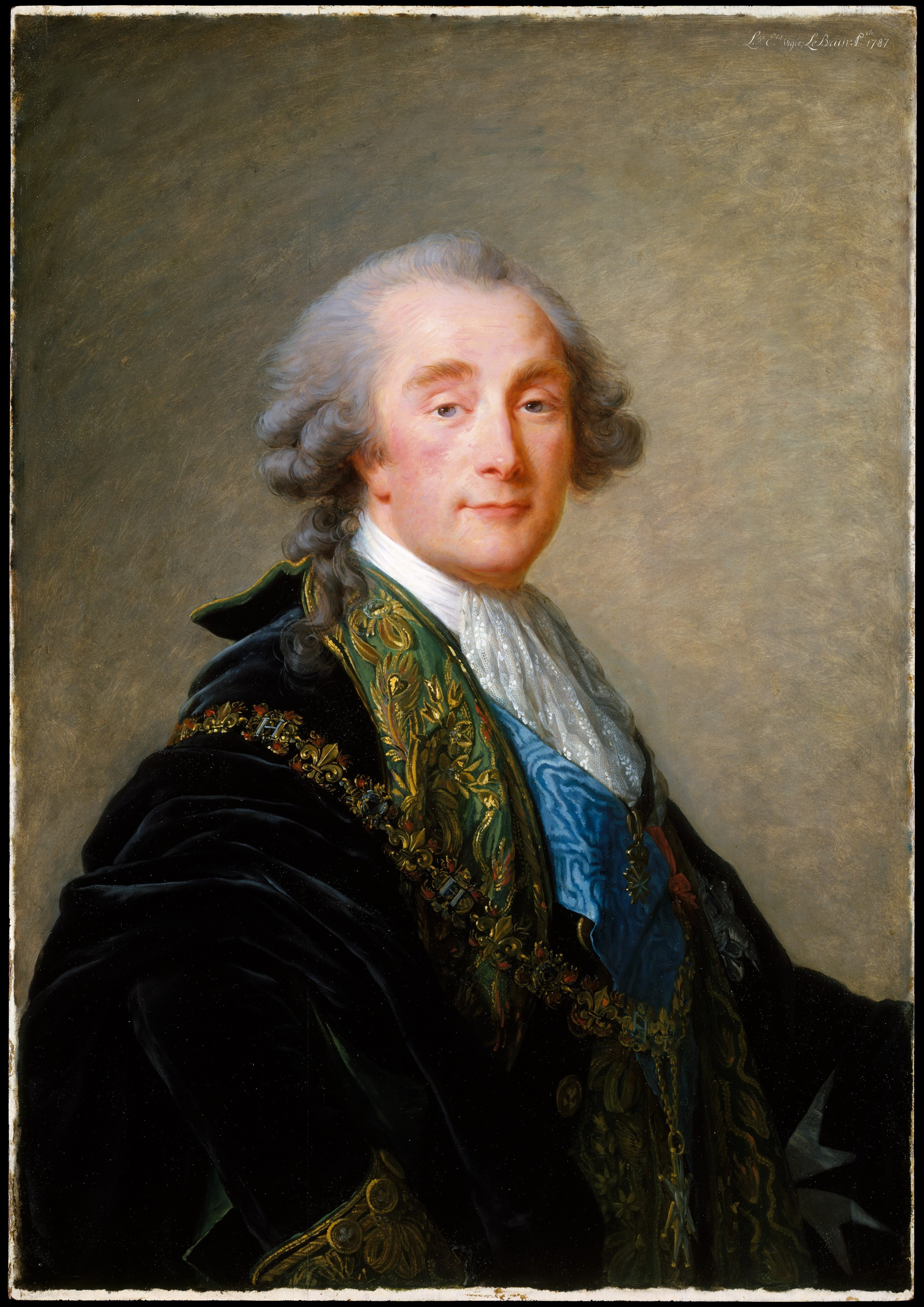
Ended the duel at the crucial moment, allowing the princes to save face: Alexandre-Charles-Emmanuel de Crussol, Chevalier de Crussol, portrayed by Élisabeth Vigée Le Brun in 1787.

As arranged, the Comte d'Artois and the Duc de Bourbon met "by chance" at the Porte des Princes in the Bois de Boulogne. The Comte d'Artois was on horseback, while the Duc de Bourbon was on foot, each accompanied by his captain of the guard: the Comte d'Artois by Alexandre-Charles-Emmanuel de Crussol-Florensac, Chevalier de Crussol, and the Duc de Bourbon by Louis Hurault de Vibraye, Marquis de Vibraye (1733–1802). The Comte d'Artois dismounted and said to the Duc de Bourbon with a smile, "Monsieur, the public asserts that we are in search of one another." The Duc de Bourbon also smiled, removed his hat and replied, "Monsieur, I present myself to receive your commands."

They played the game. Both took up their swords when the Duc de Bourbon said to the Comte d'Artois with a wink, "Pray, do not go 'en garde', Monsieur, whilst the sun dazzles you." The Comte d'Artois smiled and replied, "Indeed, you are right; the trees have as yet no leaves." Whereupon they both placed their swords under their arms and withdrew to a nearby wall, where there was shade and less public observation. Upon reaching it, they removed their spurs and shirts and began to cross blades. However, the fighting was conducted with less seriousness than is usual in a duel. When the Chevalier de Crussol thought that the Duc de Bourbon had been wounded under the arm, he interrupted the fight. He then looked to the Duc de Bourbon's captain of the guard, the Marquis de Vibraye, who agreed that this was sufficient. With the consent of the two princes, the duel was declared over, and they embraced warmly.

"I believed him [the Duc de Bourbon] to be injured, and I approached to request of the princes that they suspend."

— Alexandre-Charles-Emmanuel de Crussol, Chevalier de Crussol, reporting to Pierre Victor, Baron de Besenval, about the course of the duel

The duel lasted about six minutes. Depending on the source of information, the Duc de Bourbon is said to have wounded the Comte d'Artois either in the hand or in the arm. However, in the accounts of contemporary witnesses – particularly the Baron de Besenval and the Chevalier de Crussol – there is no mention of any actual injuries to either prince.

== A princely apology and a royal dinner at the Hôtel de Besenval ==
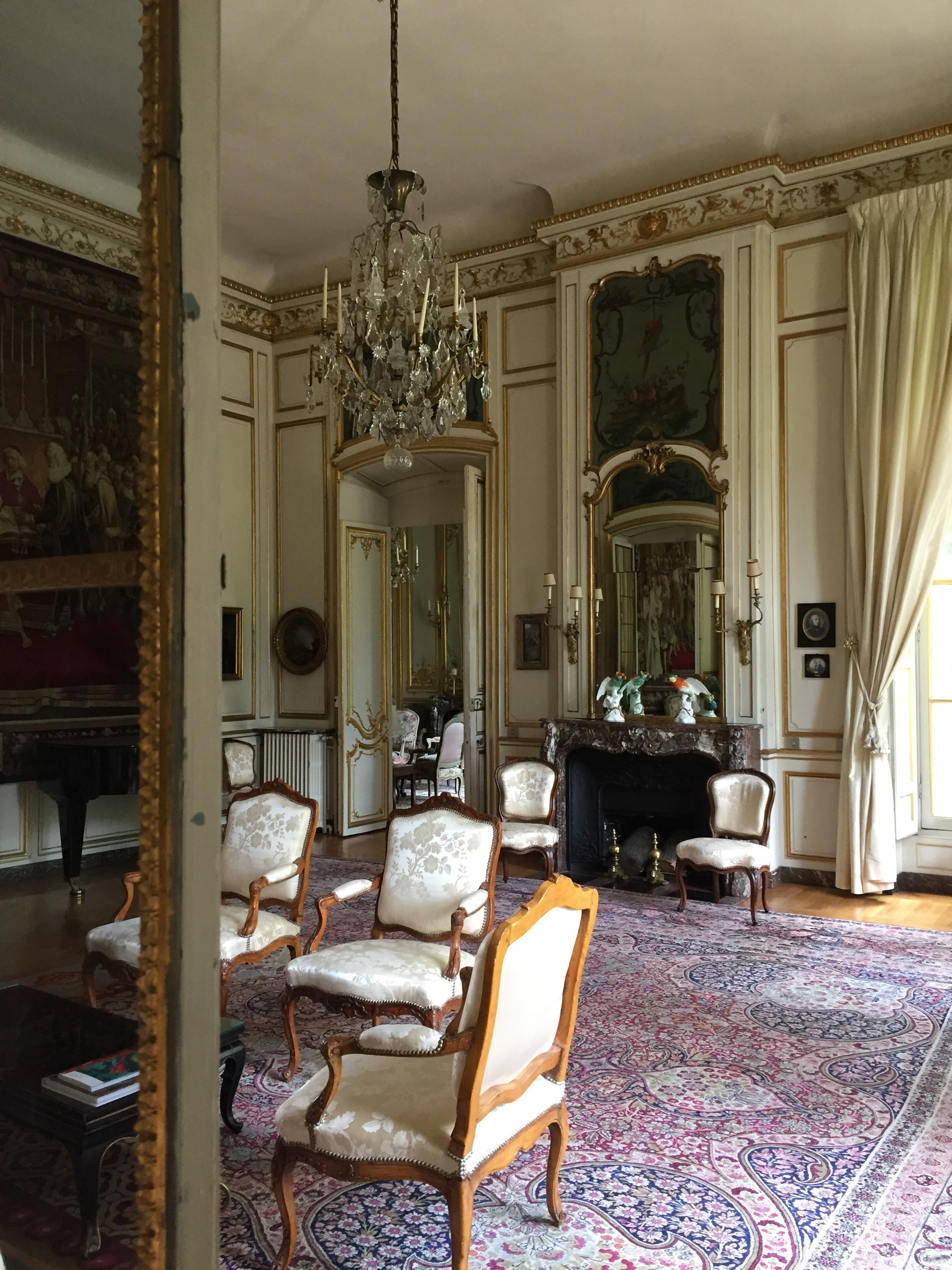
Venue of the Royal Dinner after the duel: The room at the Hôtel de Besenval, now called the Salon des perroquets, where the Baron de Besenval gathered his guests for dinner on 16 March 1778, including the Comte d'Artois, the Duc de Polignac and the Chevalier de Crussol. The neoclassical dining room was not built until 1782, by the architect Alexandre-Théodore Brongniart.

Following the duel between the Comte d'Artois and the Duc de Bourbon in the Bois de Boulogne, the Comte d'Artois's delegation proceeded – as intended – to the Hôtel de Besenval, the town house of the Baron de Besenval, where the queen's secretary, Campan, was already waiting for them. He delivered the queen's response to the Baron de Besenval, according to which she – and the king as well – considered it an excellent suggestion that the Comte d'Artois should also personally apologise to the Duchesse de Bourbon. The Comte d'Artois agreed. Accompanied by the Chevalier de Crussol and the Baron de Besenval, he then went to the Palais Bourbon to offer his personal apology to the Duchesse de Bourbon.

Back at the Hôtel de Besenval, the Comte d'Artois, the Chevalier de Crussol and the Baron de Besenval were already expected by the Duc de Polignac. He brought the message to the Comte d'Artois that the queen wished him to inform the king of what had taken place. The Baron de Besenval suggested that he would prepare a draft of the letter to the king, which the Comte d'Artois could then copy in his own hand after dinner. He also suggested that the Comte d'Artois take the opportunity to apologise to the king for the inconvenience, since the king had expressly forbidden a duel. While the gentlemen were dining at the Hôtel de Besenval, the baron's draft letter was reviewed and approved by the Chevalier de Crussol and the Duc de Polignac, after which it was copied by the Comte d'Artois and sent by courier to the king at the Château de Versailles. The king and queen were moved by the letter, and the king showed leniency towards the Comte d'Artois and the Duc de Bourbon for having engaged in a duel despite his strict prohibition.

"May such men of talent be preserved!"

— Marie-Antoinette, Queen of France, congratulating the Baron de Besenval on his excellent ideas to resolve the crisis surrounding the Incident at the Opera Ball on Mardi Gras in a letter dated 16 March 1778 and delivered to him at the Hôtel de Besenval by her secretary, Pierre-Dominique Berthollet (1722–1791), known as Campan
