= List of lords of Chantilly =

Below is a list of lords of Chantilly including the name of the Château de Chantilly, for which the titles takes its name from. Several families have been included as the owners of the land and the succession is given to the eldest son unless specified.

== House of Bouteillers de Senlis (before 1221–1358) ==
Name	Coat of Arms (Blazon)
Gui IV, Le Boutellier de Senlis	
Gui V, Le Boutellier de Senlis	
Gui VI, Le Boutellier de Senlis	
Guillaume II, Le Boutellier de Senlis	
Jean I, Le Boutellier de Senlis	
Guillaume III, Le Boutellier de Senlis	
Guillaume IV, Le Boutellier de Senlis	

Name	Term	Coat of Arms (Blazon)
Jean I de Clermont	1347–1356?	Blason Jean de Clermont, Maréchal de France
Jean II de Clermont	1356–1386	Blason Jean de Clermont, Maréchal de France

== House of Orgemont (1386-1484) ==
Name	Term	Coat of Arms (Blazon)
Pierre d'Orgemont	1315? – 1345	Blason famille fr Pierre d'Orgemont
Amaury d'Orgemont	1345 – 1375	Blason famille fr Pierre d'Orgemont
Pierre II d'Orgemont	1375 – 1415	Blason famille fr Pierre d'Orgemont
Pierre III d'Orgemont	1415 – 1484	Blason famille fr Pierre d'Orgemont

== House of Montmorency (1484-1632) ==
Name	Other Titles	Portrait	Term	Coat of Arms (Blazon)
Guillaume de Montmorency	Baron of Montmorency	Portrait de Guillaume de Montmorency - MBA Lyon	17 July 1484 – 14 May 1531	Blason Mathieu II de Montmorency
Anne de Montmorency	Baron, later Duke of Montmorency	Clouet-montmorencyanne	14 May 1531 – 12 November 1567	Coat of arms of Anne de Montmorency
François de Montmorency	Duke of Montmorency, Count of Dammartin, Baron of Châteaubriant, and Lord of l’Isle-Adam	Dejuinne - François de Montmorency (1530-1579) - MV 979	12 November 1567 – 6 May 1579	Blason Mathieu II de Montmorency
Henri I de Montmorency	Duke of Montmorency, Count of Dammartin, Baron of Châteaubriant, and Lord of l’Isle-Adam	Henri Ier de Montmorency	6 May 1579 – 2 April 1614	Blason Mathieu II de Montmorency
Henri II de Montmorency	Duke of Montmorency, Count of Dammartin, Baron of Châteaubriant, and Lord of l’Isle-Adam	Henri II de Montmorency	2 April 1614 – 20 October 1632	Blason Mathieu II de Montmorency

== House of Bourbon-Condé (1632-1830) ==
Name	Other Titles	Portrait	Term	Coat of Arms (Blazon)
Henri II de Bourbon-Condé	Prince of Condé, Peer of France, Duke of Montmorency, Duke of Albret, Duke of Enghien, Duke of Bellegarde, and Count of Sancerre	Henri, Prince of Condé	20 October 1632 – 26 September 1646	Coat of Arms of Henri II de Bourbon-Condé
Louis II de Bourbon-Condé	Prince of Condé, Duke of Bourbon, Duke of Montmorency, Duke of Enghien, Duke of Bellegarde, Duke of Fronsac, Duke of Châteauroux, Count of Sancerre, and Count of Charolais	Louis, Grand Condé	26 September 1646 – 11 December 1686	Coat of arms of the Prince of Condé
Henri III Jules de Bourbon-Condé	Prince of Condé, Duke of Bourbon, Duke of Montmorency, Duke of Enghien, Duke of Bellegarde, Duke of Châteauroux, Duke of Guise, Count of Sancerre, and Count of Charolais	Henri Jules de Bourbon, cinquième prince de Condé, jeune homme, d'après Claude Lefebvre	11 December 1686 – 1 April 1709	Coat of arms of the Prince of Condé
Louis III de Bourbon-Condé	Prince of Condé, Duke of Bourbon, Duke of Montmorency, Duke of Enghien, Duke of Bellegarde, Duke of Châteauroux, Duke of Guise, Count of Sancerre, and Count of Charolais	Louis III de Bourbon, Prince de Condé - Musée Condé PE651	1 April 1709 – 4 May 1710	Coat of arms of the Prince of Condé
Louis IV Henri de Bourbon-Condé	Prince of Condé, Duke of Bourbon, Duke of Montmorency, Duke of Enghien, Duke of Bellegarde, Duke of Châteauroux, Duke of Guise, Count of Sancerre, and Count of Charolais	Gobert, attributed to -Louis Henri of Bourbon, Prince of Condé - Versailles, MV3727	4 May 1710 – 27 January 1740	Coat of Arms of Louis Joseph, Prince of Condé
Louis V Joseph de Bourbon-Condé	Prince of Condé, Duke of Bourbon, Duke of Montmorency, Duke of Enghien, Duke of Bellegarde, Duke of Châteauroux, Duke of Guise, Count of Sancerre, and Count of Charolais	Louis Joseph de Bourbon Prince of Conde	27 January 1740 – 13 May 1818	Blason du dernier prince de Condé
Louis VI Henri de Bourbon-Condé	Prince of Condé, Duke of Bourbon, Duke of Montmorency, Duke of Enghien, Duke of Bellegarde, Duke of Châteauroux, Duke of Guise, Count of Sancerre, and Count of Charolais	Louis VI Henri de Bourbon, Prince de Condé, Delaval, Chantilly	13 May 1818 – 27 August 1830	Blason du dernier prince de Condé

== House of Orléans (1830–1897) ==
Name	Other Titles	Portrait	Term	Coat of Arms (Blazon)
Henri d'Orléans	Prince of Condé, Duke of Guise, and Duke of Aumale	Henri d'Orléans, Duc D'Aumale, Studio of Franz-Xaver Winterhalter	27 August 1830 – 7 May 1897	Coat of arms of Henri d'Orleans (1822-1897)

== See also ==
- Chantilly
- Domain of Chantilly
- Château de Chantilly
