= Louis Henri =

Louis Henri may refer to:

- Louis Henri, Prince of Condé (1756–1830)
- Louis Henri, Duke of Bourbon (1692–1740)
