= Portrait of Joséphine de Beauharnais =

Painting by François Gérard

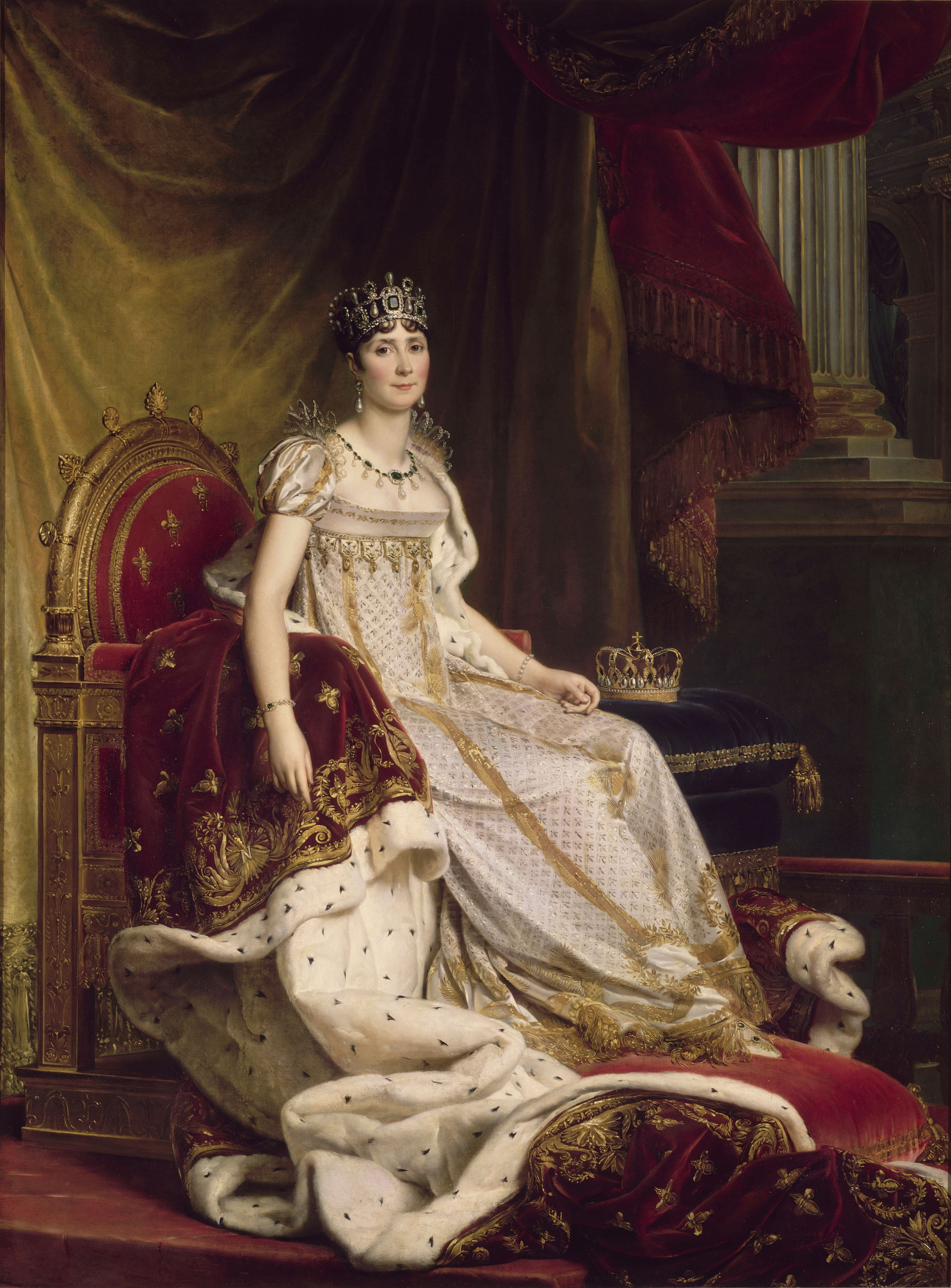
- Artist: François Gérard
- Year: 1807–08
- Type: Oil on canvas, portrait painting
- Dimensions: 214.0 cm × 160.5 cm (84.3 in × 63.2 in)
- Location: Palace of Fontainebleau; Paris

Portrait of Joséphine de Beauharnais is an 1808 portrait painting by François Gérard. It depicts Joséphine de Beauharnais, the Empress of France. A member of the Tascher noble family, she was the first wife of Napoleon and their marriage was annulled in 1810. She is shown at full-length in ceremonial robes.

The work was exhibited at the Salon of 1808 at the Louvre in Paris. Gerard was a celebrated portraitist during the Napoleonic era, and his career continued to flourish following the Restoration of the Monarchy in 1815. He painted many members of the Bonaparte dynasty.

The original painting is now at the Palace of Fontainebleau in Paris. Other versions exist of the painting, as the image was replicated during the Napoleonic era. A notable copy is now in the Museum of French History at the Palace of Versailles.

== Bibliography ==
- Palmer, Alan. Napoleon & Marie Louise: The Emperor's Second Wife. ISBN 0312280084. Constable, 2001.
