= Christian Louis de Montmorency-Luxembourg =

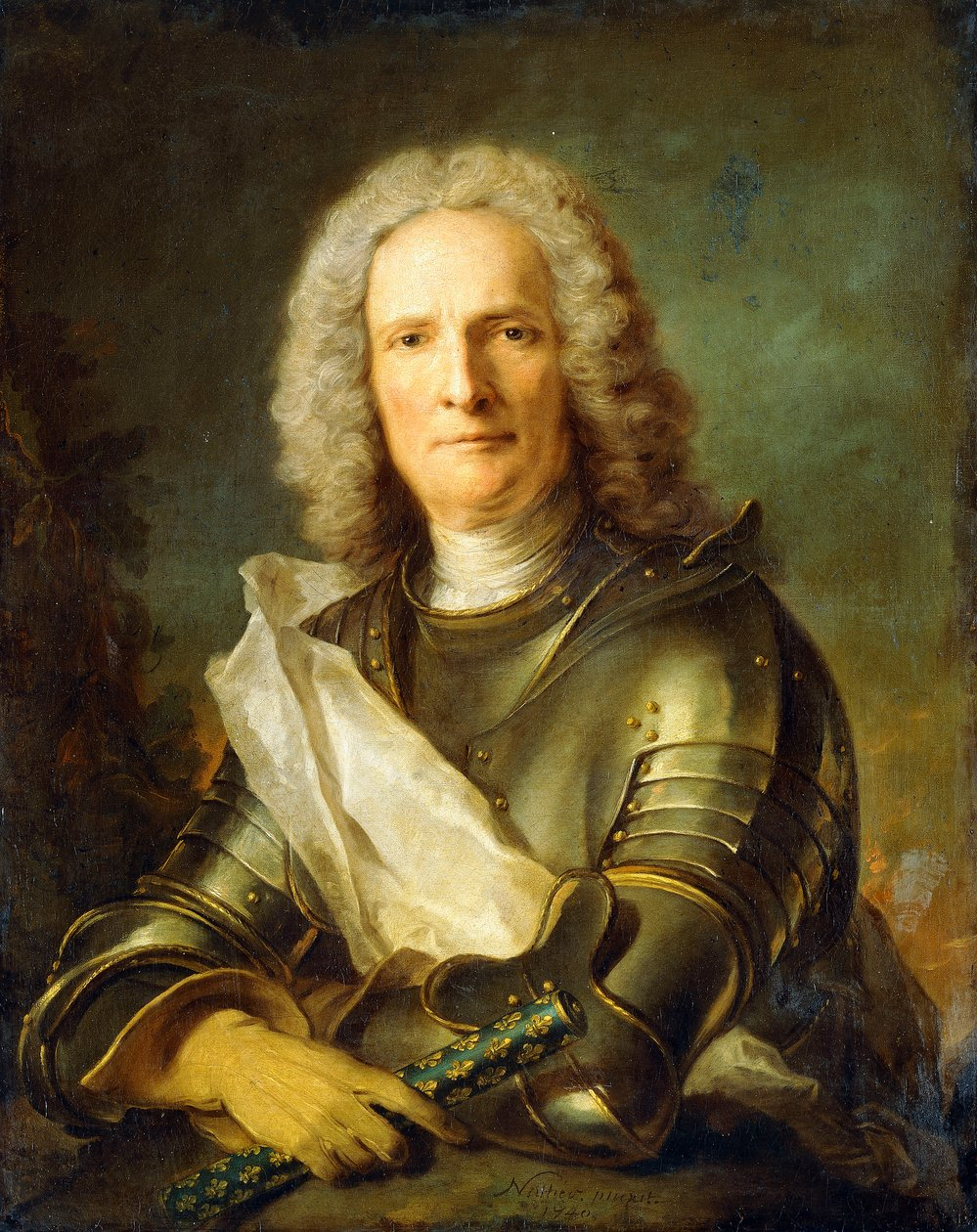
Christian de Montmorency-Luxembourg

Christian de Montmorency-Luxembourg (9 February 1675 – 23 November 1746), prince of Tingry, count of Beaumont and count of Luxe, was a marshal of France (1734).

== Biography ==
He was the 4th son of marshal François-Henri de Montmorency-Luxembourg, duke of Piney and Madeleine de Clermont-Tonnerre. He served under his father in several battles of the Nine Years' War, like the Siege of Namur (1692), the Battle of Steenkerque and the Battle of Neerwinden (1693).

Appointed Brigadier in 1702 and Brigadier General in 1704, he served in the army of Italy between 1702 and March 1707. In 1708, he became Lieutenant General of Flanders and played a significant role in the Defense of Lille. He served again in Flanders as a Lieutenant General in 1709 and obtained the governorship of Valenciennes upon the death of Marshal de Choiseul in 1711.
He played a decisive role in the battle of Denain in 1712, and participated in the conquest of Marchiennes, Douai, Le Quesnoy and Bouchain.

In 1722 he commissioned the building of hôtel Matignon, today the office of the French Prime Minister.
The king made him a Knight of the Order of the Holy Spirit on 2 February 1731.

At the start of the War of Polish Succession, he was employed in the Rhine campaign and served at the Siege of Kehl, which capitulated on 28 October 1733, and at the Siege of Philippsburg, which surrendered on 18 July 1734. The King created him Marshal of France on 14 June of the same year, but his promotion was not declared until 17 January 1735.

=== Marriage and children ===
He married on 7 September 1711 Louise-Madeleine de Harlay (1694-1749), Comtesse de Beaumont. They had :

- Charles-François-Christian (1713-1787), 1st Duc de Beaumont
- Eléonore-Marie (1715-1755), married Louis-Léon Potier de Tresmes, 3rd Duke of Gesvres
- Marie-Louise-Cunégonde (1716-1764), married Louis-Ferdinand de Croÿ-d'Havré, killed at the Battle of Villinghausen
- Joseph-Maurice-Annibal (1717-1762), Count of Luxe
- Sigismond-François (1720-1720)
- Nicolas-Achille-Louis (1723-1725).

== Sources ==
- L'art de vérifier les dates des faits historiques, des chartes, des chroniques ...- de David Bailie Warden, Saint-Allais (Nicolas Viton), Maur François Dantine, Charles Clémencet, Ursin Durand, François Clément - 1818
