= Gaston d'Audiffret-Pasquier =

French politician

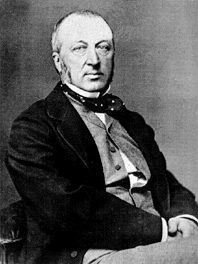
- Audiffret-Pasquier in 1870.
- Born: Edme-Armand-Gaston; 21 October 1823; Paris
- Died: 4 June 1905 (aged 81); Paris
- Resting place: Saint-Christophe-le-Jajolet
- Occupation: politician
- Predecessor: Félix Dupanloup
- Successor: Alexandre Ribot

Edme-Armand-Gaston, 1st Duke of Audiffret-Pasquier (21 October 1823, in Paris – 4 June 1905), known as Gaston Audiffret-Pasquier, was a French politician and member of the Académie Française, Seat 16. He was preceded in his position by Félix Dupanloup and succeeded by Alexandre Ribot.

== Life ==
He was the grand-nephew and adopted son of Baron Etienne Denis Pasquier, an academician. He inherited the title of duke in 1844, and became auditor at the council of state in 1846.

After the revolution of 1848 he retired to private life. Under the Second Empire he was twice an unsuccessful candidate for the legislature, but was elected in February 1871 to the National Assembly of France, and became president of the Centre-right parliamentary group in 1873. After the fall of Thiers, Audiffret-Pasquier directed the negotiations between the different royalist parties to establish the Comte de Chambord as King of France, but as Chambord refused to give up the white flag of the Bourbons in favor of the tricolor, the project failed. Yet he retained the confidence of the chamber, and was its president in 1875 when the constitutional laws were being drawn up. Nominated senator for life under the new constitution, he likewise was president of the Senate from March 1876 to 1879 when his party lost the majority. Henceforth he was less prominent in politics. Audiffret-Pasquier was distinguished by his moderation and uprightness; and he did his best to dissuade MacMahon from taking violent advisers.

In 1878 he was elected to the Académie française, but never published anything.
