= Duke of Audiffret-Pasquier =

French peerage

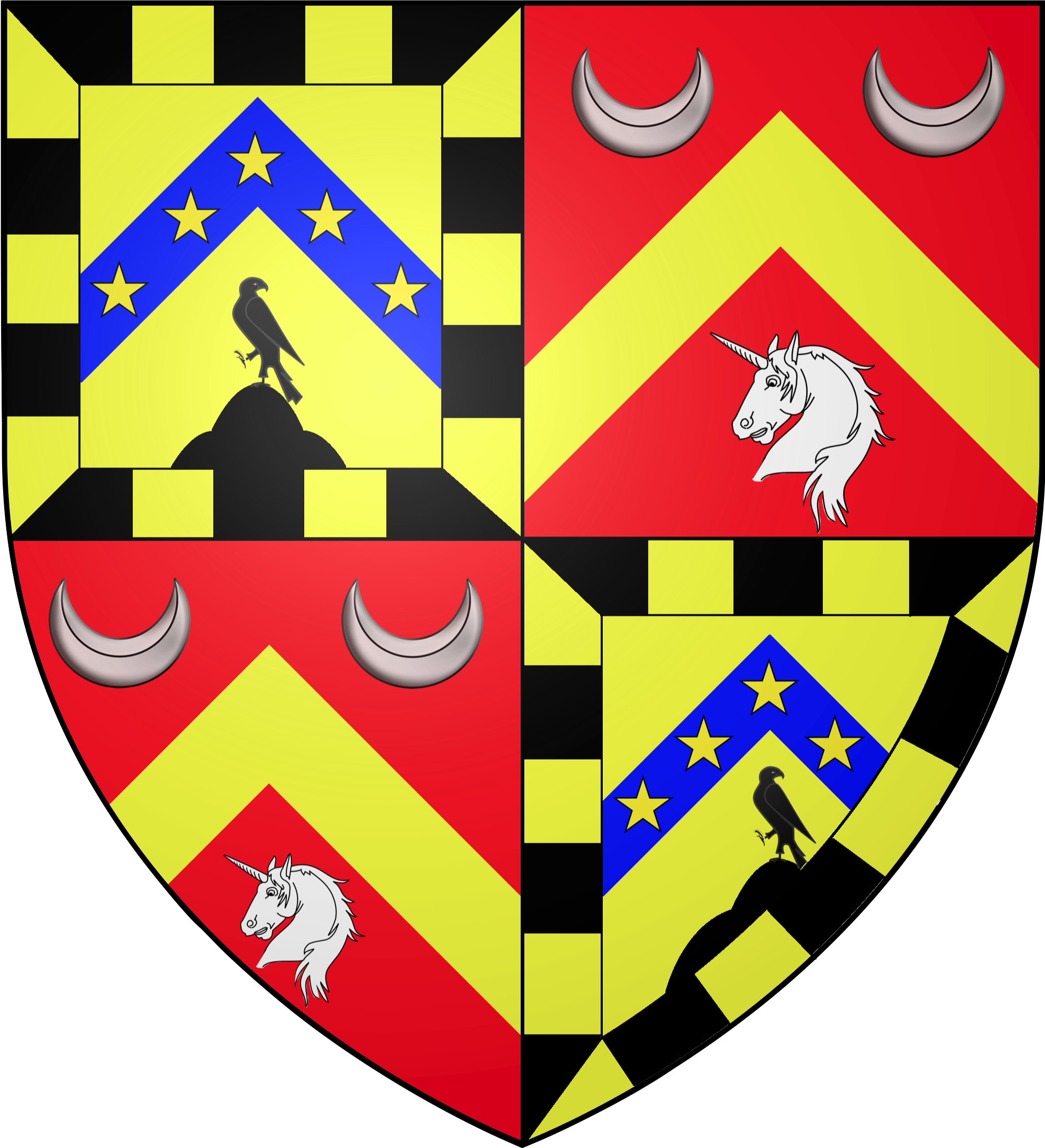
- Arms of the Dukes of Audiffret-Pasquier
- Creation date: 1863
- Created by: Napoleon III
- Peerage: Peerage of France
- First holder: Gaston d'Audiffret-Pasquier
- Present holder: Xavier d'Audiffret-Pasquier, 5th Duke of Audiffret-Pasquier
- Seat: Château de Sassy

The title of Duke of Audiffret-Pasquier (French: duc d'Audiffret-Pasquier) is a title of the French nobility.

== History ==
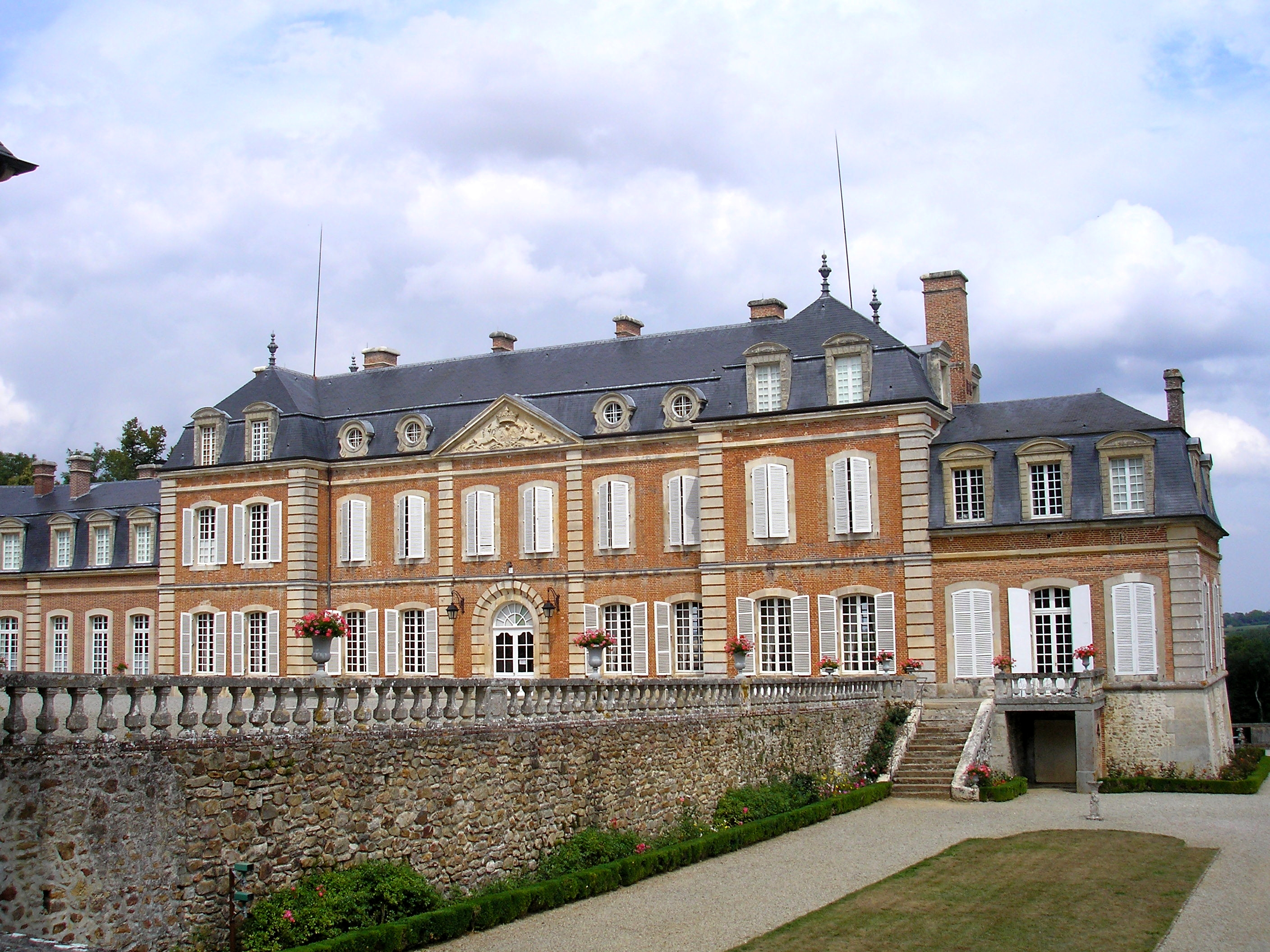
Château de Sassy

The title was created in 1863 by Emperor Napoleon III by the reversion of the title of Duke of Pasquier (created for Étienne-Denis Pasquier by royal ordinance of 16 December 1844 and confirmed by letters patent of 3 February 1845) in favor of the holder's great-nephew (and adopted son), Gaston d'Audiffret.

== Dukes of Audiffret-Pasquier ==
- Gaston d'Audiffret-Pasquier (1823–1905), 1st Duke of Audiffret-Pasquier, President of the National Assembly, then of the Senate, member of the French Academy
- Étienne d'Audiffret-Pasquier (1882–1957), 2nd Duke of Audiffret-Pasquier, deputy of Orne (1919–1940), grandson of the above.
- Denis d'Audiffret-Pasquier (1913–1999), 3rd Duke of Audiffret-Pasquier
- Etienne d'Audiffret-Pasquier (1951–2001), 4th Duke of Audiffret-Pasquier
- Xavier d'Audiffret-Pasquier (b. 1988), 5th Duke of Audiffret-Pasquier.

== See also ==
- List of French dukedoms
