= Charles Boulanger de Boisfremont =

French painter (1773–1838)

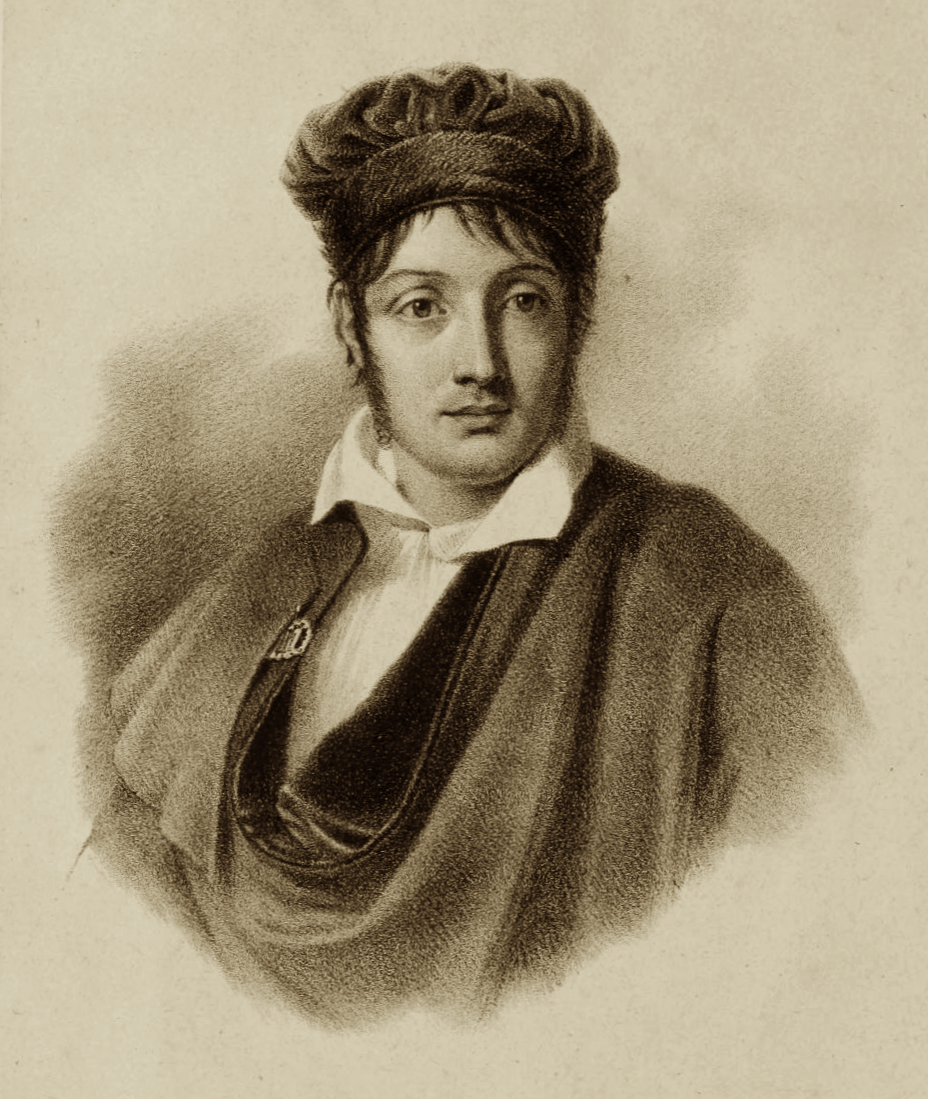
- Portrait of Charles Boulanger de Boisfrémont by Pierre-Roch Vigneron.
- Born: Charles Boulanger de Boisfremont; 25 June 1773; Rouen, France
- Died: 5 March 1838 (aged 64); Paris, France
- Known for: Painting

Charles Boulanger de Boisfremont (1773–1838), one of the pages of Louis XVI, went to America during the Revolution, and there taught himself painting. On his return he commenced exhibiting his works, in which he seems to have adopted Prud'hon as his model. Art is indebted to him for the restoration of the pictures at Versailles when they were in a very bad state of decay. He was born in Rouen on 25 June 1773. He died in Paris on 5 March 1838. He exhibited amongst others the following:

- The Death of Abel. 1803.
- Hector upbraiding Paris (gold medal and 500 francs). 1806.
- The Descent of Orpheus into Hell (gold medal and 1000 francs). 1808.
- The Clemency of Napoleon towards the Princess of Hatzfeld (purchased by the Government, and executed in tapestry at the Gobelins for the cabinet of Napoleon at the Tuileries). 1808.
- The Education of Jupiter on Mount Ida (forming the ceiling of the pavilion of Marsan). 1812.
- The Good Samaritan (in the Rouen Museum.). 1822.
- The Death of Cleopatra (also in the Rouen Museum). 1824.
- The Chastity of Joseph. 1826.
- Le Déshabillé. Same year.
