= Duc de Beaumont =

- Creation date: 1765
- Creation: 1st Creation
- Created by: Louis XV
- First holder: Charles-François-Christian de Montmorency-Luxembourg
- Last holder: Anne Edouard Louis Joseph de Montmorency-Luxembourg
- Remainder to: The grantee's heirs males of the body
- Subsidiary titles: Prince de Tingry; Comte de Luwe
- Status: Extinct
- Extinction date: 1878
- Seat: Château de Beaumont

Duc de Beaumont is an extinct title of nobility in the peerage of France which was created by letters patent in 1765 for French Royal Army officer Charles-François-Christian de Montmorency-Beaumont-Luxembourg.

== History ==
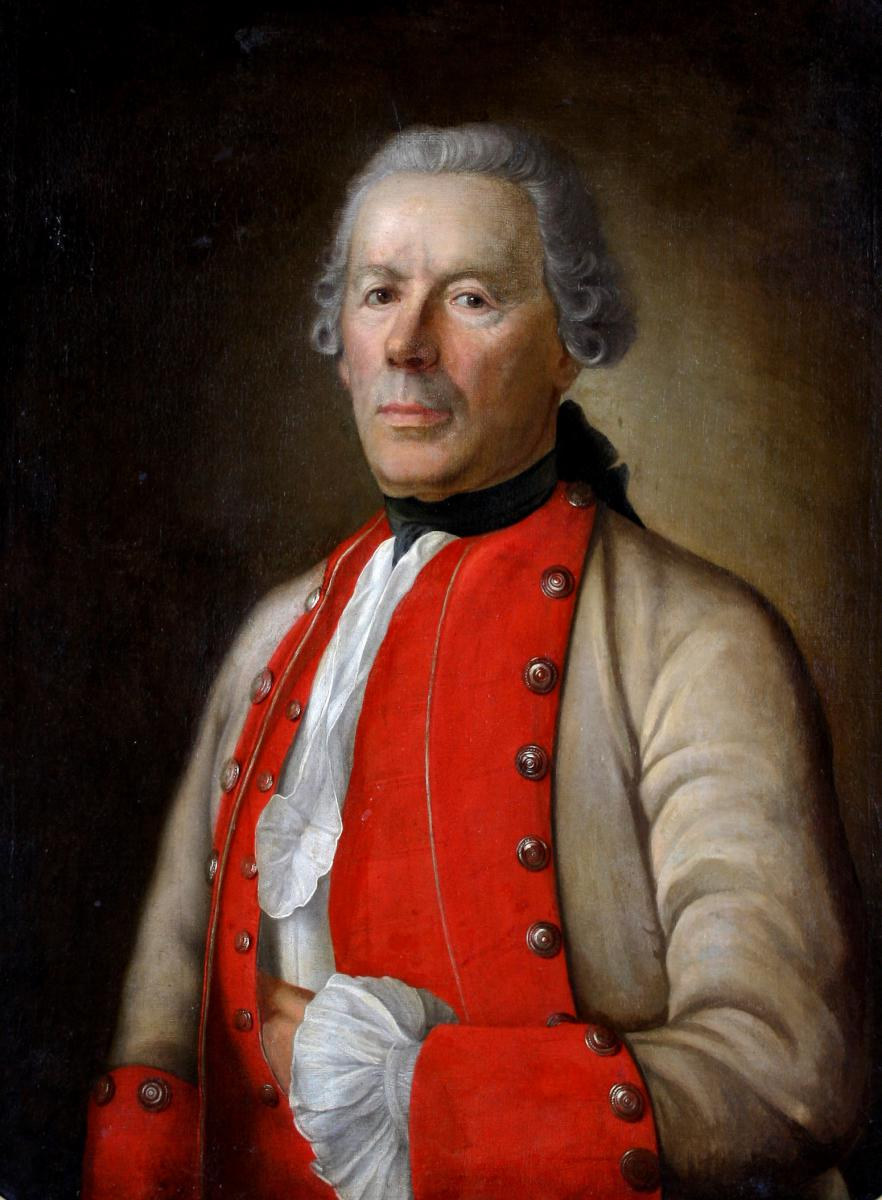
A portrait of Charles-François-Christian de Montmorency-Beaumont-Luxembourg

The lordship of Beaumont-du-Gâtinais in the Île-de-France, was raised to County for Achille de Harlay, a prominent judge and Premier President of the Parlement of Paris. The title went extinct in 1717 with his great-grandson, another Achille de Harlay, but the lands themselves were inherited by the latter's daughter, wife of the Marhall of Montmorency (third son of the Duke of Luxembourg).

The Beaumont title was resurrected as a Dukedom for their son Charles-François-Christian de Montmorency-Luxembourg, a general in the French Army. It was a "simple dukedom", meaning his holder was not a Peer of France. It became extinct on the death of the grantee's grandson Anne-Édouard-Louis-Joseph de Montmorency-Beaumont-Luxembourg, in 1878.

== Counts of Beaumont (1612) ==
- 1612-1616 : Achille de Harlay (1536–1616), Premier President of the Parlement of Paris, 1st count of Beaumont.
- 1616-1671 : Achille de Harlay (1606–1671), Procurator General of the Paris Parliament, 2nd count of Beaumont.
- 1671-1712 : Achille de Harlay (1639–1712), Premier President of the Paris Parliament, 3rd count of Beaumont.
- 1712-1717 : Achille de Harlay (1668–1717), Advocate General of the Paris Parliament, 4th count of Beaumont.
- 1717-1749 : Louise-Madeleine de Harlay (1694-1749), heiress of Beaumont, wife of the Marshall of Montmorency.

== Ducs de Beaumont (1765) ==
- 1713-1787 : Charles-François-Christian de Montmorency-Beaumont-Luxembourg. (1713–1787).
- 1787–1790; 1815-1821 : Anne Christian de Montmorency-Luxembourg (1767–1821).
- 1821–1848; 1852-1878 : Anne Edouard Louis Joseph de Montmorency-Luxembourg, styled prince of Montmorency-Luxembourg (1802–1878).
