= Duke of Enghien =

Noble title

Duke of Enghien (French: Duc d'Enghien, pronounced [dɑ̃ɡɛ̃] with a silent i) was a noble title pertaining to the House of Condé. It was only associated with the town of Enghien for a short time.

== Dukes of Enghien – first creation (1566–1569) ==
The title was first conferred on Louis I de Bourbon, Prince de Condé, whose County of Enghien in modern-day Belgium was elevated to a duchy-peerage in 1566. However, the necessary registration process was not completed, so the title became extinct at his death in 1569. In spite of this legal loophole, from 1569 to 1689 the eldest son of the Prince of Condé also held the title of Duke of Enghien. The most famous of them is Louis II, also known as the Great Condé, who held the title of Duke of Enghien from his birth in 1621 to his father's death in 1646.

== Dukes of Enghien – second creation (1689–1830) ==
His grandson Henry II, Prince of Condé, inherited the Duchy of Montmorency near Paris in 1633, and in 1689 the Duchy of Montmorency was renamed as Duchy of Enghien for his son Louis II, Prince of Condé. The title Duke of Enghien was thereafter used as a courtesy title for the eldest son of the Prince of Condé.

1. 1689–1709: Henri I, Duke of Enghien (1643–1709)
2. 1709–1710: Louis I, Duke of Enghien (1668–1710)
3. 1710–1740: Louis II Henri, Duke of Enghien (1692–1740)
4. 1740–1818: Louis III Joseph, Duke of Enghien (1736–1818)
5. 1818–1830: Louis IV Henri, Duke of Enghien (1756–1830)

Most often it refers to Louis-Antoine-Henri de Bourbon-Condé, duc d'Enghien (1772–1804), the son of Louis Henry II, whose execution on trumped-up charges in 1804 during the French Consulate removed any hope of reconciliation between Napoleon Bonaparte and the House of Bourbon. The duke was executed in the moat of the Château de Vincennes.

On the death of the last duke in 1830, the title passed to Louis Philippe III, Duke of Orléans, a great-great-grandson of the Louis I, Duke of Enghien through the female line. He had become King of the French as Louis Philippe I a month earlier.
