= Piney, Aube =

Commune in Grand Est, France

Piney
- Commune
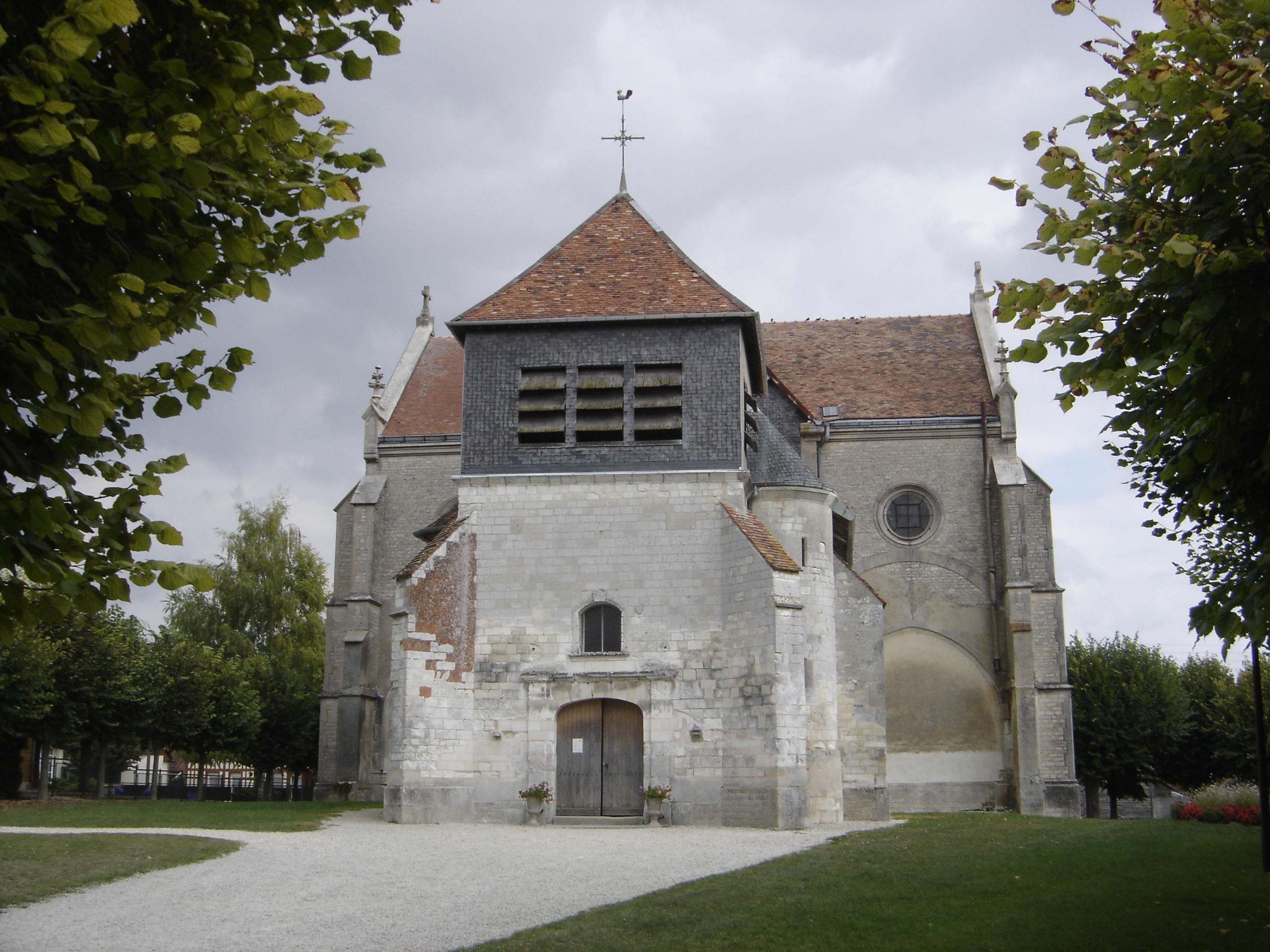
- The church in Piney

- Coat of arms
- Location of Piney
- Location within France Location within Grand Est
- Coordinates: 48°21′49″N 4°20′01″E
- Country: France
- Region: Grand Est
- Department: Aube
- Arrondissement: Troyes
- Canton: Brienne-le-Château
- Intercommunality: Forêts, lacs, terres en Champagne

Government
  - Mayor (2020–2026): Christian Denormandie
- Area^{1}: 70.98 km^{2} (27.41 sq mi)
- Elevation: 108 m (354 ft)
- Highest elevation: 140 m (460 ft)
- Lowest elevation: 100 m (330 ft)
- Population (2023): 1,387
  - Density: 19.54/km^{2} (50.61/sq mi)
- Time zone: UTC+01:00 (CET)
  - Summer (DST): UTC+02:00 (CEST)
- INSEE/Postal code: 10287 /10220
- ^{1} French Land Register data, which excludes lakes, ponds, glaciers > 1 km^{2} (0.386 sq mi or 247 acres) and river estuaries.

Piney (French pronunciation: [pinɛ]) is a commune in the Aube department in north-central France.

== Population ==
Historical population
Year	Pop.	±% p.a.
1968	1,005	—
1975	1,037	+0.45%
1982	1,112	+1.00%
1990	1,124	+0.13%
1999	1,226	+0.97%
2007	1,252	+0.26%
2012	1,518	+3.93%
2017	1,484	−0.45%
2023	1,387	−1.12%
Source: INSEE

== See also ==
- Communes of the Aube department
- Parc naturel régional de la Forêt d'Orient
