= Louis Henri, Prince of Condé =

French royal (1756–1830)

Louis Henri Joseph de Bourbon-Condé
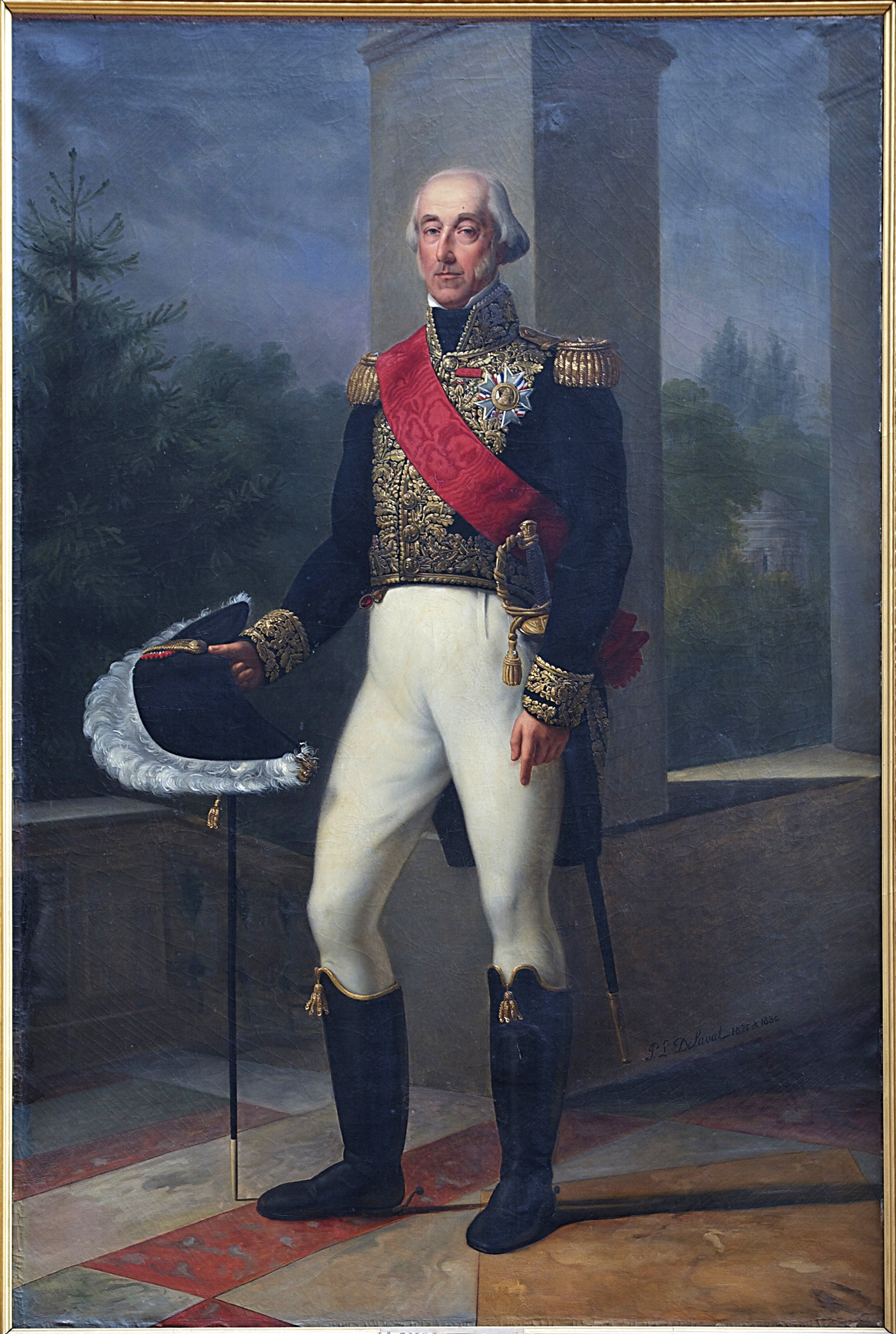

Prince of Condé
- Tenure: 13 May 1818 – 30 August 1830
- Predecessor: Louis Joseph
- Successor: Title Extinct

Duke of Bourbon
- Tenure: 2 August 1772 – 30 August 1830
- Predecessor: Louis Joseph
- Successor: Disputed

Lord of Chantilly
- Tenure: 13 May 1818 – 30 August 1830
- Predecessor: Louis Joseph
- Successor: Henri d'Orléans, Duke of Aumale
- Born: 13 April 1756; Paris, Isle-de-France, Kingdom of France
- Died: 30 August 1830 (aged 74); Château de Saint-Leu, Val-d'Oise, Kingdom of France
- Spouse: Bathilde d'Orléans (m. 1770; died 1822)
- Issue: Louis Antoine, Duke of Enghien and other illegitimate children
- House: Bourbon-Condé
- Father: Louis Joseph, Prince of Condé
- Mother: Charlotte de Rohan

Military service
- Years of service: 1792–1795
- Battles/wars: French Revolutionary Wars; War of the First Coalition; Flanders Campaign (1792–1795); Rhine Campaign of 1795

Louis Henri Joseph de Bourbon (13 April 1756 – 30 August 1830) was the last Prince of Condé, a title he held from 13 May 1818 until his death in 1830. He was the brother-in-law of Philippe Égalité and nephew of Victoire de Rohan.

== Life ==
Louis Henri was the only son of Louis Joseph, Prince of Condé by his first wife, Charlotte de Rohan, daughter of Charles de Rohan, Prince of Soubise. As a member of the reigning House of Bourbon, he was a prince du sang and was entitled to the style of Serene Highness, prior to his accession to the Condé title, while he was known as the duke of Enghien and later as Duke of Bourbon. On succeeding his father he was entitled to the style of Royal Highness.

== Marriage ==
On 24 April 1770, he married Bathilde d'Orléans, the only surviving daughter of Louis Philippe d'Orléans, Duke of Orléans and Louise Henriette de Bourbon. The couple were married in the chapel at the Palace of Versailles and were descended from Louis XIV to the same degree, their paternal great-grandmothers were sisters, daughters of Madame de Montespan. In 1772 their only son, Louis Antoine, Duke of Enghien, was born. In March 1778, King Louis XVI's youngest brother, the Count of Artois (the future King Charles X), assaulted his wife at a masked ball, leading Louis Henri to challenge him to a duel; "they met early one morning in the Bois de Boulogne, the fight being stopped after the Duke wounded Charles in the hand." This affair became known as: An Incident at the Opera Ball on Mardi Gras in 1778. Although the two men were reconciled in 1779, the marriage did not turn out to be a happy one, and in 1780 the couple separated. Louis never remarried.

Shortly afterwards, Louis Henri began a public affair with the Paris Opera singer Marguerite “Mimi” Michelot, which resulted in two illegitimate daughters, one of whom, Adèle, went on to marry the Comte de Reuilly. During the French Revolution, Louis Henri accompanied his father into exile in England and survived the purge of the House of Bourbon in France, which cost the lives of King Louis XVI and his wife Queen Marie Antoinette, amongst others.

In 1804, his son, Louis Antoine, Duke of Enghien, was abducted in Germany by order of Napoleon and executed in the moat of the Château de Vincennes on trumped-up charges of treason. The Duke of Enghien had been married to Charlotte Louise de Rohan for less than two months and had no issue.

Louis Henri returned with his father to France after the defeat of Napoleon in 1814, and both recovered their fortunes and public status. On his father's death in 1818, he assumed the title of Prince of Condé.

== Restoration ==
Uniform of a Chasseur à Cheval during the restoration period

During the 1814 restoration, the Prince, as Duke of Bourbon, became the namesake for the 8th Bourbon Light Horse Regiment (8ème Régiment de Chasseurs à Cheval de Bourbon). However, following Napoleon's return in March 1815, the regiment joined Napoleon and he emigrated to Belgium. Within the Infantry Corps, the Prince was made Colonel General of the Light Infantry and consequently became the namesake for the Bourbon Line Infantry Regiment which was formed by the merger of the 9th Line Infantry Regiment (9ème Régiment d'Infanterie de Ligne) and the 2nd & 7th Battalions of the 37th Light Infantry Regiment (37ème Régiment d'Infanterie Légère). This regiment also joined Napoleon after his return from Elba in March 1815.

== End of the Condé ==
While in exile in 1811, the duc de Bourbon had made the acquaintance at a bordello in Piccadilly of Sophia Dawes or Daw, a maid in a brothel from the Isle of Wight. He set the woman and her mother up in London in a house on Gloucester Street. There, she went through an extensive educational program.

After the Bourbon Restoration in 1815, Louis Henri brought her to Paris and arranged a marriage for her to Baron Adrien Victor de Feucheres, an officer in the Royal Guard. This was done to allow Sophia's entry into French society. However, in the course of setting up her marriage license, Sophia lied on several particulars. Feucheres, who became an aide to the duke, believed for several years that Sophia was a natural daughter of Louis Henri II. When he discovered the truth, he separated from his wife, and informed King Louis XVIII of the real relationship between Louis Henri and Sophia. The king banned Sophia from court.

In revenge, Sophia approached the head of the House of Orléans, the Duke of Orleans, and through him made a new entry into society. In return, she agreed to use her influence on the aging Louis Henri II to have him set up a will making the son of Louis Philippe, Prince Henri, Duke of Aumale, the old prince's main heir. Sophia was given two million francs for her services in the matter. The new Bourbon king, Charles X, eventually accepted her back at court. She was again considered acceptable by polite French society. She was even able to arrange the marriage of a niece to a nephew of Talleyrand.

By now, Louis Henri was trying to get away from the mistress who had taken over his life. In the summer of 1830, he returned to his home at St. Leu. There, he heard of the July Revolution. Sophia immediately set about to get him to recognize the new Orléans monarchy.

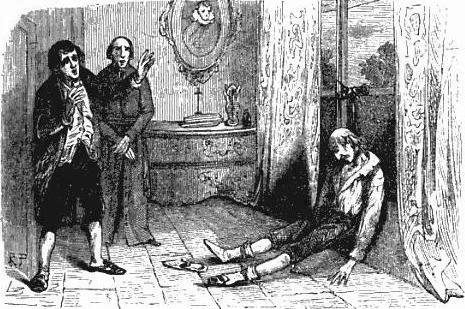
Finding The Prince. Gravure extraite de l'Histoire de Louis-Philippe Ier roi des Français, 1847

On 30 August 1830, Louis Henri was found dead with a rope around his neck but his feet on the ground; while there were initially suspicions of foul play, with the baroness being implicated, an inquiry was held which formally declared his death to be a suicide. There were rumours that the new King of the French, Louis-Philippe, had collaborated with Sophia in the crime, as they feared that she and Louis Phillippe's son Aumale – the testamentary heirs of Condé – might be disinherited by the Prince after a possible flight abroad. Later, rumours circulated amongst the nobility that Condé had died pleasuring himself, engaged in what would later be known as autoerotic asphyxiation. Since there was insufficient evidence to prove that he had been murdered, the baroness was not prosecuted, although she was involved in litigation regarding the inheritance for years to come.

There are some aspects of the relationship between Sophia and the Prince which may have inspired William Thackeray's novel Vanity Fair, specifically concerning the character Becky Sharp and her possible involvement in the death of Joseph Sedley. With Louis Henri's death the line of Bourbon-Condé came to an end; his lands and wealth passed to his godson, the Duke of Aumale. His father, Louis Philippe, was the feudal-law heir to Conti and Condé, being the grandson of Louise Henriette de Bourbon, a daughter of Louise Élisabeth de Bourbon, who was sister of Louis Henri II's grandfather.

== Issue ==
Arms of Louis Henri

1. Louis Antoine de Bourbon, Duke of Enghien (2 August 1772 – 21 March 1804); died without issue.

He also had illegitimate issue;

1. Adélaïde "Adele" de Bourbon (10 November 1780 – 26 May 1874); styled Mademoiselle de Bourbon: illegitimate with Marguerite Michelot. She married firstly in 1803 to Patrice Gabriel Bernard de Montessus, comte de Reuilly, and secondly on 24 June 1833 to Guy Eugène Victor, marquis de Chaumont-Quitry. No issue.
2. Louise Charlotte Aglaé de Bourbon (10 September 1782 – 1831); illegitimate with Marguerite Michelot. Unmarried.
3. Daughter* (born December 1817, lived a few days); illegitimate with certain Sophie Harris.
4. Son* (stillborn May 1819); illegitimate with certain Sophie Harris.

== Ancestry ==
Ancestors of Louis Henri, Prince of Condé

8. Louis III, Prince of Condé
4. Louis Henri, Duke of Bourbon
9. Louise Françoise de Bourbon
2. Louis Joseph, Prince of Condé
10. Ernest Leopold, Landgrave of Hesse-Rotenburg
5. Caroline of Hesse-Rotenburg
11. Eleonore of Löwenstein-Wertheim
1. Louis Henri de Bourbon
12. Jules, Prince of Soubise
6. Charles, Prince of Soubise
13. Anne Julie de Melun
3. Charlotte de Rohan
14. Emmanuel Théodose de La Tour d'Auvergne
7. Anne Marie Louise de La Tour d'Auvergne
15. Anne Marie Christiane de Simiane

Note: The above Anne Julie de Melun was the younger sister of Louis de Melun, Duke of Joyeuse; he was the secret husband of Louise Adélaïde's great-aunt Marie Anne de Bourbon (1697–1741); Louis de Melun's wife was Armande de La Tour d'Auvergne — the eldest granddaughter of Marie Anne Mancini.

== Footnotes ==
Louis Henri, Prince of Condé House of Bourbon Cadet branch of the House of Bourbon Born: 13 April 1756? Died: 30 August 1830
French nobility
Preceded by Louis Joseph	Prince of Condé; 13 May 1818 – 30 August 1830	Title extinguished end of dynasty
