= Septimanie d'Egmont =

French noble (1740–1773)

Jeanne Sophie de Vignerot du Plessis
- Countess of Egmont
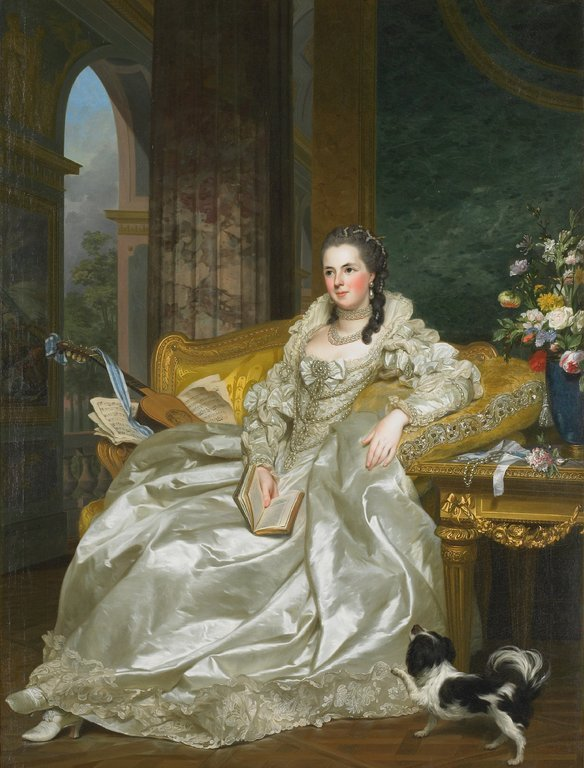
- The Countess by Roslin.
- Full name: Jeanne Louise Armande Élisabeth Sophie de Vignerot du Plessis
- Born: 1 March 1740; Montpellier, France
- Died: 14 October 1773 (aged 33)
- Buried: Braine, Aisne, France
- Spouses: Casimir Pignatelli, Count of Egmont (1755)
- Father: Louis François Armand de Vignerot du Plessis, 3rd Duke of Richelieu
- Mother: Princess Élisabeth Sophie of Lorraine

Jeanne Sophie de Vignerot du Plessis (Jeanne Louise Armande Élisabeth Sophie ; 1740 – 14 October 1773) known as Septimanie d'Egmont was a French salonist.

== Biography ==
Born the daughter of Louis François Armand de Vignerot du Plessis, Duke of Richelieu, and Princess Élisabeth Sophie de Lorraine (daughter of Joseph, Count of Harcourt), a French prince étranger, she was raised with her paternal aunt in a Benedictine convent. In 1755 she was married to Don Casimir Pignatelli, Count of Egmont, Prince de Gavre (1727-1801), son of Don Procopio Pignatelli d'Egmont, Duke of Bisaccia, Prince de Gavre (1703-1743) and his wife, Henriette Julie de Durfort (1696-1779).

She hosted a salon which gathered "the literary celebrities of the days", including Voltaire and Rousseau, and was a center of opposition to Madame du Barry. Through her close friendship with the Swedish ambassador to France, Ulrik Scheffer, she came to know the future Gustav III of Sweden during his visit to Paris in 1771. Thereafter she maintained a correspondence with him during his reign. She advised him to "repress the strife of the raging parties", advocated a "monarchy restrained by laws" and greeted his coup of 1772 with joy, especially its non-bloody character. She called Gustav III "The hero of my heart", and it is considered likely that she had influence "upon the enlightened, humanistic, in many ways liberated direction of the early reign of Gustav III".

Rousseau visited her at her Château de Braine in 1771, where he recited his autobiographical work Confessions.

== Ancestry ==
Ancestors of Septimanie d'Egmont

16. René de Vignerot, seigneur de Pontcourlay
8. François II de Vignerot, Marquis de Pontcourlay
17. Françoise du Plessis
4. Armand, Duc de Richelieu
18. Thomas de Guémadeuc, Baron de Guemadeuc
9. Marie Françoise de Guémadeuc
19. Jeanne Ruellan
2. Armand de Vignerot du Plessis
20. Honorat d'Acigné, Comte de Grand-Bois
10. Jean-Léonard, Comte d'Acigné
21. Jacqueline de Lavallezé
5. Anne Marguerite d'Acigné
22. Honorat-Auguste d'Acigné, Comte de Grand-Bois
11. Anne-Marie d'Acigné, Comtesse de Grand-Bois
23. Renée de Keraldanet
1. Jeanne Sophie de Vignerot du Plessis
24. François Louis, Count of Harcourt
12. Alphonse Henri, Count of Harcourt
25. Anne d'Ornano
6. Joseph, Count of Harcourt
26. Charles de Brancas
13. Marie Françoise de Brancas
27. Suzanne Garnier
3. Élisabeth Sophie de Lorraine
28. Nicolas Jeannin de Castille
14. Gaspard Jeannin de Castille
29. Claude de Fieubet
7. Marie Louise Jeannin de Castille
30. Nicolas Dauvet
15. Louise Diane Dauvet des Marets
31. Chrétienne de Lantage

== Sources ==
- Marie-Célestine-Amélie-de Segur Armaille, Comtesse d', La comtesse d'Egmont, fille du maréchal de Richelieu, 1740-1773. D'après ses lettres inédites à Gustave III, Perrin et Cie, 1890.
- Jean-Claude Hauc, "Septimanie d'Egmont, princesse républicaine" in Trois femmes des Lumières, Les Editions de Paris, 2010.
- Nordisk familjebok / Uggleupplagan. 6. Degeberg - Egyptolog (in Swedish)
- Beth Hennings, Grevinnan d'Egmont och Gustav III (1920)
