= Antoine de Vignerot du Plessis =

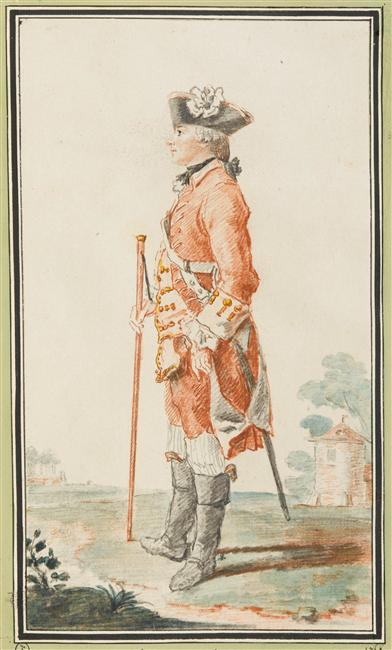
Portrait of Antoine de Vignerot du Plessis (1736-1791), son of Armand de Vignerot du Plessis.

Louis Antoine Sophie de Vignerot du Plessis, 4th Duke of Richelieu (4 February 1736 – 1791), was a French nobleman and general. He was known by the courtesy title of Duke of Fronsac before 1788. He also held the titles of Prince de Mortagne, Marquis du Pont-Courlay, Count of Cosnac, Baron de Barbezieux, Baron de Coze and Baron of Saugeon.

== Life and career ==
He was the son of Louis François Armand de Vignerot du Plessis (1696–1788), 3rd Duke of Richelieu, Marshal of France and an expert courtier, and of Marie Élisabeth Sophie de Lorraine (daughter of Anne Marie Joseph de Lorraine. Madame de Pompadour wished Antoine to marry her daughter, but his father avoided that demand by pretending that Antoine's mother was a Princess of Lorraine (much superior to the house of Richelieu) and that he would thus need the permission of the head of that house (Emperor Francis I) for the marriage. Madame de Pompadour did not press her claims any further.

A first cousin was Marie Charlotte, Princess of Beauvau, wife of Charles Juste de Beauvau and daughter of the Duke of Bouillon.

He succeeded his father as a premier gentilhomme de la chambre to King Louis XVI, and later became a maréchal de camp and lieutenant général (1780).

== Marriage and issue ==
His first marriage, on 25 February 1764, was to Adélaïde de Hautefort. They had one child, Armand Emmanuel (1766–1822).

His second marriage, on 20 April 1776, was to Marie-Antoinette de Galliffet. They had two children :

1. Armande Marie (born 1777), who became Marquise of Montcalm-Gozon
2. Armande Simplicie Gabrielle (born 1778), who became Marquise of Jumilhac

== Ancestry ==
Ancestors of Antoine de Vignerot du Plessis

16. René de Vignerot, Seigneur of Pontcourlay
8. François II de Vignerot, Marquis of Pontcourlay
17. Françoise du Plessis
4. Armand Jean de Vignerot du Plessis
18. Thomas de Guémadeuc, Baron of Guemadeuc
9. Marie Françoise de Guémadeuc
19. Jeanne Ruellan
2. Armand de Vignerot du Plessis
5. Anne Marguerite d'Acigné
1. Louis Antoine Sophie de Vignerot du Plessis
24. François Louis, Count of Harcourt
12. Alphonse Henri, Count of Harcourt
25. Anne d'Ornano
6. Joseph, Count of Harcourt
13. Marie Françoise de Brancas
3. Élisabeth Sophie de Lorraine
7. Marie Louise Jeannin de Castille

== Bibliography ==
- Evelyne Lever, Madame de Pompadour, collection tempus, Perrin, Paris, 2000

French nobility
Preceded by Armand de Vignerot du Plessis	Duke of Richelieu; 1788–1791	Succeeded by Armand Emmanuel de Vignerot du Plessis
Preceded by Armand de Vignerot du Plessis	Duke of Fronsac; 1788–1791	Succeeded by Armand Emmanuel de Vignerot du Plessis
