= Élisabeth Sophie de Lorraine =

- Duchess of Richelieu
- Born: 1710; France
- Died: 2 August 1740 (aged 29–30)
- Burial: 20 August 1740; Chapelle de la Sorbonne, Paris, France
- Spouse: Armand de Vignerot du Plessis
- Issue Detail: Antoine, Duke of Richelieu; Jeanne Sophie, Countess of Egmont
Names
- Marie Élisabeth Sophie de Lorraine
- House: House of Lorraine
- Father: Joseph, Count of Harcourt
- Mother: Marie Louise Jeannin de Castille

Élisabeth Sophie de Lorraine (Marie Élisabeth Sophie; 1710 – 2 August 1740) was a French noblewoman and the second wife of Armand de Vignerot du Plessis, the notoriously lecherous Duke of Richelieu.

== Biography ==
Élisabeth Sophie de Lorraine was born in 1710 and was the second daughter of Joseph de Lorraine, Count of Harcourt and his wife Marie Louise Jeannin de Castille. Her older sister Louise Henriette Françoise married Emmanuel Théodose de La Tour d'Auvergne, Duke of Bouillon in 1725.

As a member of the House of Guise in France, she held the status of a princesse étrangère.

Family relations included Emmanuel Maurice de Lorraine-Guse, Duke of Elbeuf; Béatrice Hiéronyme de Lorraine, Abbess of Remiremont; Élisabeth Thérèse de Lorraine, Princess of Epinoy; and Queen Elisabeth of Sardinia.

She was proposed as a bride for Paul Anton, a prince of the Hungarian House of Esterházy and a distinguished soldier and patron of music. The marriage never materialised.

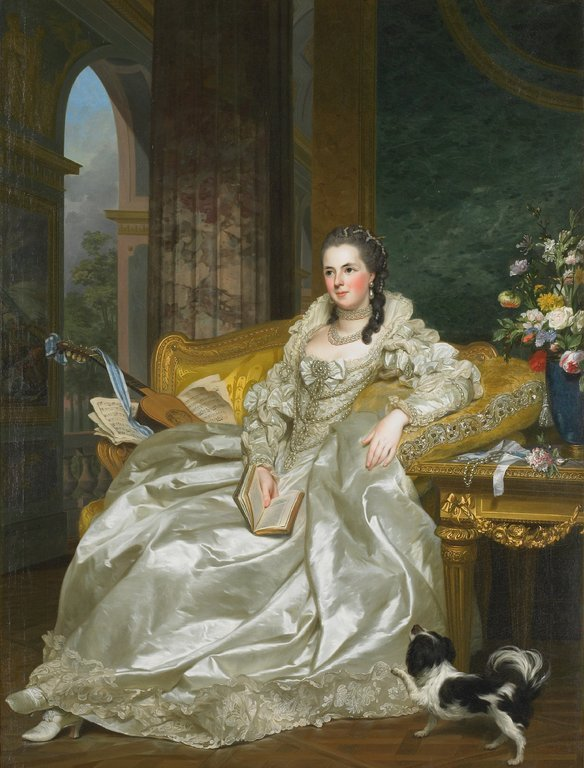
A painting of her daughter Jeanne Sophie by Alexander Roslin.

In the end, with the help of Voltaire, the Duke of Richelieu was married to Élisabeth Sophie. As she was a princess of the House of Lorraine, Richelieu had to ask permission from the reigning Duke of Lorraine, Francis III Stephen. The Duke of Lorraine accepted and Élisabeth Sophie married Armand de Vignerot du Plessis, duc de Richelieu on 7 April 1734.

Richelieu had been married before to Anne Catherine de Noailles but had had no children. In Sophie's marriage to him she birthed two children, including the next Duke of Richelieu.

It was said at court that Élisabeth Sophie had a "strong mind" and a "heart capable of great affection and gratitude." She was praised for her virtuous, passionate nature and was said to be a devoted wife to one of the most notorious womanisers of the age.

She died of scurvy in her husband's arms on 2 August 1740, at about thirty years of age and five months after the birth of her daughter. She was buried at the Chapelle de la Sorbonne on 20 August 1740. In 1780, her husband married again to Jeanne Catherine Josèphe de Lavaulx; there were no children from the marriage.

== Issue ==
1. Antoine de Vignerot du Plessis, 4th Duke of Richelieu (4 February 1736 – 1791) married Adélaide Gabrielle de Hautefort in 1765 and had issue; married Marie Antoinette de Gallifet and had issue.
2. Jeanne Sophie de Vignerot du Plessis (1 March 1740 – 14 October 1773) married Don Casimir Pignatelli, Count of Egmont, Duke of Bisaccia in 1755; no issue.

== Ancestry ==
Ancestors of Élisabeth Sophie de Lorraine

16. Charles de Lorraine, Duke of Elbeuf
8. François Louis de Lorraine, Count of Harcourt
17. Catherine Henriette de Bourbon, légitimée de France
4. Alphonse Henri de Lorraine, Count of Harcourt
18. Henri François d'Ornano, seigneur de Mazargues
9. Anne d'Ornano
19. Marguerite de Maubec-Montlaur
2. Anne Marie Joseph de Lorraine, Count of Harcourt
20. Georges de Brancas, Duke of Villars
10. Charles de Brancas, Count of Brancas
21. Julienne Hypolite d'Estrées
5. Françoise de Brancas
22. Mathieu Garnier
11. Suzanne Garnier
23. Louise Bazin
1. Élisabeth Sophie de Lorraine
24. Pierre de Castille
12. Nicolas Jeannin de Castille, Marquis de Montjeu
25. Charlotte Jeannin
6. Gaspard Jeannin de Castille, Marquis de Montjeu
26. Gaspard de Fieubet, seigneur de Caslaurt et Jaillac
13. Claude de Fieubet
27. Marie-Claude Ardier/Aldier de Beauregard
3. Marie Louise Chrétienne Jeannin de Castille, Marquise de Montjeu
28. Gaspard Dauvet, Count des Marets
14. Nicolas Dauvet, Count of Marets
29. Isabelle Brûlart
7. Louise Diane Dauvet
15. Christine de Lantage, dame de Vitry-le-Croisé
