= Marie Françoise de Brancas, Princess of Harcourt =

Marie Françoise de Brancas
- Born: 1650
- Died: April 13, 1715; Clermont-en-Beauvaisis, Province of Picardy, France
- Spouse: Alphonse Henri, Count of Harcourt (m. 1667–1715)
- Children: 9, including Joseph, Count of Harcourt, François Marie de Lorraine, Count of Maubec

Marie Françoise de Brancas (1650–1715), Princess of Harcourt and Marquise of Maubec, was a French aristocrat and courtier during the reign of Louis XIV. She was a lady-in-waiting to Queen Marie Thérèse and later became an intimate friend of Madame de Maintenon, the King's morganatic second wife.

== Early life and ancestry ==
Marie Françoise was the eldest daughter of Count Charles de Brancas (1618-1681) and his wife, Susanne Garnier (1630-1685), widow of François de Brézé, Seigneur d’Isigny en Normandie. Her father was a Chevalier d'honneur to Queen Anne of Austria, the mother of Louis XIV.

== Career at Versailles ==
The Princess of Harcourt was one of the dames d'honneur to Queen Marie-Thérèse. Like many influential courtiers at Versailles, the Princesse d'Harcourt sold favors and offices to those who could pay for them. She was paid a large amount of money by Louis Phélypeaux, marquis de La Vrillière, to broker a marriage between him and a daughter of Anne-Marie-Francoise de Sainte-Hermine, Dame d'atours. The Princess also secured de la Vrillière the venal post held by his new wife's father as part of the deal. Harcourt sold invitations to the king's residence at Marly for £6,000 each.

In his memoirs, the Duke of Saint-Simon paints an unflattering picture of the Princess d'Harcourt, calling her "a blonde Fury, nay more, a harpy: she had all the effrontery of one, and the deceit and violence; all the avarice and audacity...". He described her as "a tall fat creature, mightily brisk in her movements, with a complexion like milk-porridge, great ugly thick lips, and hair like tow, always sticking out and hanging down in disorder, like all the rest of her fittings-out. Dirty, slatternly, always intriguing, pretending, enterprising, quarrelling..." Harcourt was hated by Marie Adélaïde of Savoy, Duchess of Burgundy, who was the wife of the Dauphin Louis. The Duchess tormented the Princess d'Harcourt with practical jokes like setting off firecrackers under her chair, or bombarding her with snowballs in her bed.

== Later life ==
The Princess undertook extensive renovations at the Château d'Harcourt, where she filled in some of the moats and demolished the eastern outer wall. She also undertook to build a hospital in the village of Harcourt, the Hospice des Augustines, which was in operation until 2012. In 1702, she purchased the Countship of Clermont-en-Beauvaisis.

== Marriage and issue ==
De Brancas married Prince Alphonse Henri of Lorraine, Count of Harcourt, member of the junior branch of the House of Lorraine, on 21 February 1667 in Paris. Upon her marriage, she held the title of Princesse étranger. The couple had 9 children together.

- Charles de Lorraine (born 1673, died young)
- Anne-Marie-Joseph de Lorraine, Count of Harcourt (1679-1739)
- François de Lorraine, Prince of Montlaur (1684-1705)
- François-Marie de Lorraine, Prince of Maubec, (1686-1706), wounded and taken prisoner at the Battle of Blenheim in 1704, died from illness at Guastalla two years later.
- Anne de Lorraine-Elbeuf, demoiselle d'Harcourt, (1668-1671)
- Marie de Lorraine-Elbeuf, demoiselle de Montlaur, (1669-1671)
- Anne de Lorraine-Elbeuf, demoiselle de Maubec, (1670-1671)
- Anne-Marguerite de Lorraine, (born 1675, died young)
- Susanne de Lorraine-Elbeuf, (1668-1671)
