= Élisabeth de Lorraine =

Élisabeth de Lorraine may refer to:

- Elisabeth of Lorraine-Vaudémont (c. 1395–1456)
- Elisabeth of Lorraine, Electress of Bavaria (1574–1635)
- Élisabeth Thérèse of Lorraine, Princess of Epinoy (1664–1748)
- Élisabeth Charlotte of Lorraine (1700–1711)
- Élisabeth Sophie de Lorraine (1710–1740)
- Elisabeth Therese of Lorraine, Queen of Sardinia (1711–1741)
