= Armand Emmanuel de Vignerot du Plessis, 5th Duke of Richelieu =

French politician (1766–1822)

The Duke of Richelieu
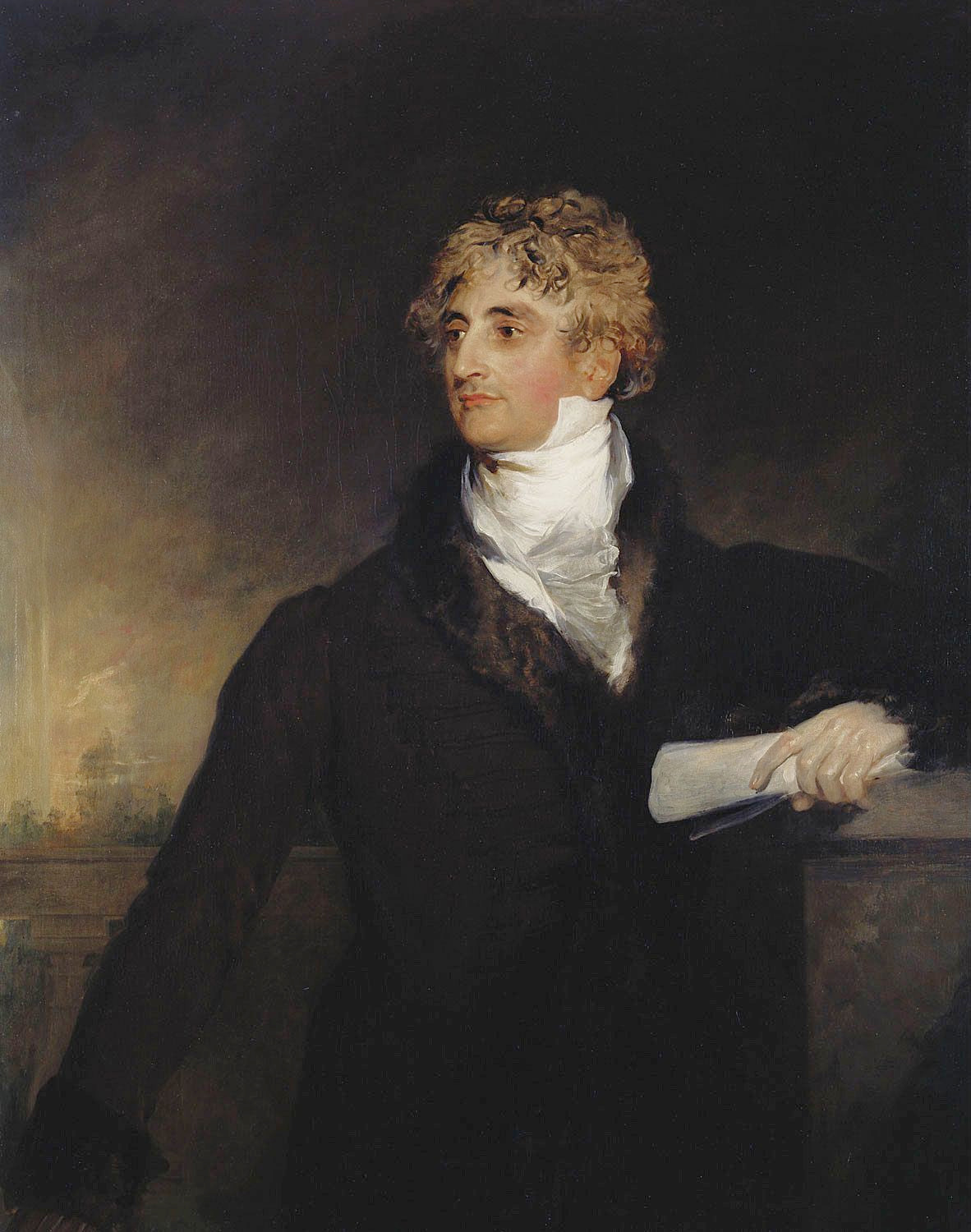
- Portrait of the Duke of Richelieu by Thomas Lawrence, 1818

Prime Minister of France
- In office 20 February 1820 – 14 December 1821
- Monarch: Louis XVIII
- Preceded by: Comte Decazes
- Succeeded by: Comte de Villèle
- In office 26 September 1815 – 29 December 1818
- Monarch: Louis XVIII
- Preceded by: Charles Maurice de Talleyrand-Périgord
- Succeeded by: Marquis Dessolles

Member of the Académie française
- In office 23 March 1816 – 17 May 1822
- Preceded by: Antoine-Vincent Arnault
- Succeeded by: Bon-Joseph Dacier

Governor of Odessa
- In office 8 October 1803 – 27 August 1814
- Monarch: Alexander I
- Preceded by: Paul Pustoshkin
- Succeeded by: Thomas A. Cobley

Personal details
- Born: Armand Emmanuel Sophie Septimanie Vignerot du Plessis; 25 September 1766 Paris, France
- Died: 17 May 1822 (aged 55) Paris, France
- Party: Doctrinaires
- Spouse: Rosalie de Rochechouart (m. 1781)
- Profession: Diplomat, military officer

Military service
- Allegiance: Kingdom of France; Russian Empire
- Branch/service: French Royal Army; Army of Condé; Imperial Russian Army
- Years of service: 1785–1814
- Rank: Captain; Major general
- Unit: Dragoon; 3rd Hussar Regiment
- Battles/wars: French Revolutionary Wars; Russo-Turkish War; Napoleonic Wars

Armand Emmanuel Sophie Septimanie de Vignerot du Plessis, 5th Duke of Richelieu and Fronsac (French: [aʁmɑ̃d emanɥɛl dy plɛsi]; 25 September 1766 – 17 May 1822), was a French statesman during the Bourbon Restoration. He was known by the courtesy title of Count of Chinon until 1788, then Duke of Fronsac until 1791, when he succeeded his father as Duke of Richelieu.

As a royalist, during the French Revolutionary Wars and Napoleonic Wars, he served as a senior officer in the Imperial Russian Army, achieving the grade of major general. Following the Bourbon Restoration, he returned to his homeland and reentered politics. A prominent member of the centre-right Doctrinaire faction of constitutional monarchists, he was twice Prime Minister of France.

== Early years ==
He was born in Paris, the son of Antoine de Vignerot du Plessis, 4th Duke of Richelieu, and of his wife, Adélaïde de Hautefort. His father was the son and heir of King Louis XV of France's favourite, Armand de Vignerot du Plessis, 3rd Duke of Richelieu.

Known by the courtesy title of comte de Chinon during the lifetime of his distinguished grandfather, he was married on 4 May 1782 at the age of fifteen to Alexandrine Rosalie Sabine de Rochechouart-Faudoas (13 December 1768 – 9 December 1830), a hunchbacked child of fourteen. Immediately after the wedding, Chinon embarked upon the Grand Tour with his tutor, visiting the cities of Geneva, Florence and Vienna. Because of Rosalie's deformity, it is unlikely the marriage was ever consummated. During their long marriage, which was often punctuated with periods of extended separation, the two were never more than formal with each other.

After three years of foreign travel, he entered Queen Marie Antoinette's Regiment of Dragoons and the next year assumed his aged grandfather's place at court as a premier gentilhomme de la chambre to King Louis XVI. At the Palace of Versailles, it was his duty to attend the King during the highly ritualized daily lever and coucher ceremonies. Despite his young age, he had a reputation at court for puritanical austerity. After his grandfather died and his father succeeded to the dukedom of Richelieu in 1788, Chinon became known as the Duke of Fronsac (duc de Fronsac).

By 1789, he was a captain in the Esterhazy Regiment of Hussars. On 5 October of that year, he was in Paris when the March on Versailles began. Worried about the safety of the royal family, he disguised himself as one of the crowd and started out on foot to Versailles in order to warn the King and Queen. Unable to break through the large number of people on the road, he took a shortcut through the woods. He arrived just as the angry mob was converging on the palace. He went immediately to the Queen and convinced her to seek refuge in the King's apartments, thus arguably saving her life.

== Exile ==
On Marie Antoinette's direction, he left Paris in 1790 for Vienna to discuss the recent events of the French Revolution with her older brother, the Holy Roman Emperor Joseph II. Before he got there, however, Joseph died. Instead, Richelieu attended the coronation of the new Emperor, Leopold II, in Frankfurt and then followed the Habsburg court back to Vienna. There, he renewed a friendship with Prince Charles de Ligne, the son of the Austrian diplomat, the Prince de Ligne. Together, they decided to join the Imperial Russian Army as volunteers. Accompanied by another friend, the Comte de Langeron, they reached the Russian headquarters at Bender, Moldavia on 21 November. The three were present at Alexander Suvorov's capture of Izmail. For his service in that battle, Fronsac was decorated by the Russian Empress Catherine the Great with the Order of St. George and given a golden sword.

On the death of his father in February 1791, he succeeded to the title of Duke of Richelieu. Because of an unwillingness on the part of various nobles to serve in the royal household, King Louis XVI soon afterwards summoned him back to Paris in order for him to resume his position as a premier gentilhomme at the Tuileries Palace. He was not, however, sufficiently in the confidence of the court to be informed of the projected flight to Varennes on the night of 20 June 1791.

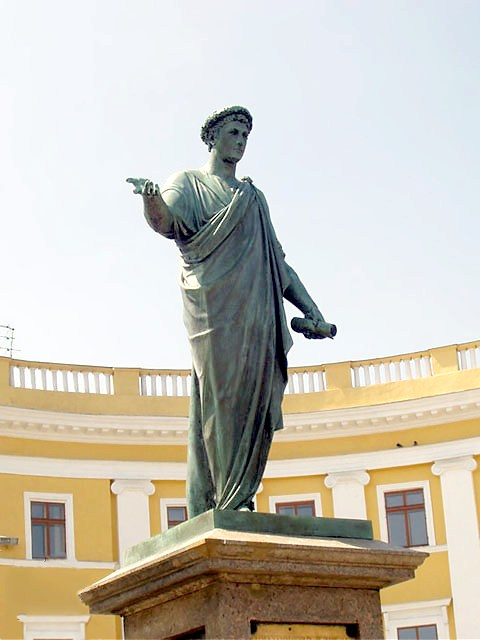
Ivan Martos's statue of the Duke of Richelieu in Odesa, Ukraine

Feeling that his role at court was useless in helping the King deal with all the revolutionary agitation that was embroiling Paris, Richelieu in July obtained with royal permission a passport from the National Constituent Assembly in order to return to Vienna as a diplomat. After a short stay in Austria, however, Richelieu joined the counter-revolutionary émigré army of Louis XVI's cousin, the Prince of Condé, which was headquartered in the German frontier town of Koblenz. Later, after Condé's forces had suffered several defeats, Catherine the Great offered positions in her army to the officers serving under Condé. Richelieu accepted.

In the Russian army, he achieved the rank of Major General but later resigned his commission after what he considered an unwarranted reprimand by Catherine's successor, Emperor Paul I. His prospects brightened, however, after Paul was murdered in 1801. The new Russian emperor, Alexander I, was one of his friends. The erasure of Richelieu's name from the list of prohibited émigrés who could not legally return to France, which Richelieu on his own had previously been unable to secure from Napoleon Bonaparte, was accorded on the request of Alexander's new government, and in 1803 Alexander appointed him as the governor of Odessa. Two years later, he became Governor-General of a large swathe of land recently conquered from the Ottoman Empire and called New Russia, which included the territories of Kherson, Ekaterinoslav and the Crimea. He commanded a division in the Russo-Turkish War, 1806-1812, and was engaged in frequent expeditions to the Caucasus. Richelieu played a role during Ottoman plague epidemic which hit Odessa in the autumn 1812. Dismissive of any attempt to forge a compromise between quarantine requirements and free trade, Prince Kurakin (the Saint Petersburg-based High Commissioner for Sanitation) countermanded Richelieu's orders. In the eleven years of his administration, Odessa greatly increased in size and importance, eventually becoming the third largest city in the empire by population. The grateful Odessans erected a bronze monument to him in 1828. These are the famous Odessa Steps, crowned by a statue of Richelieu.

== Return to France ==
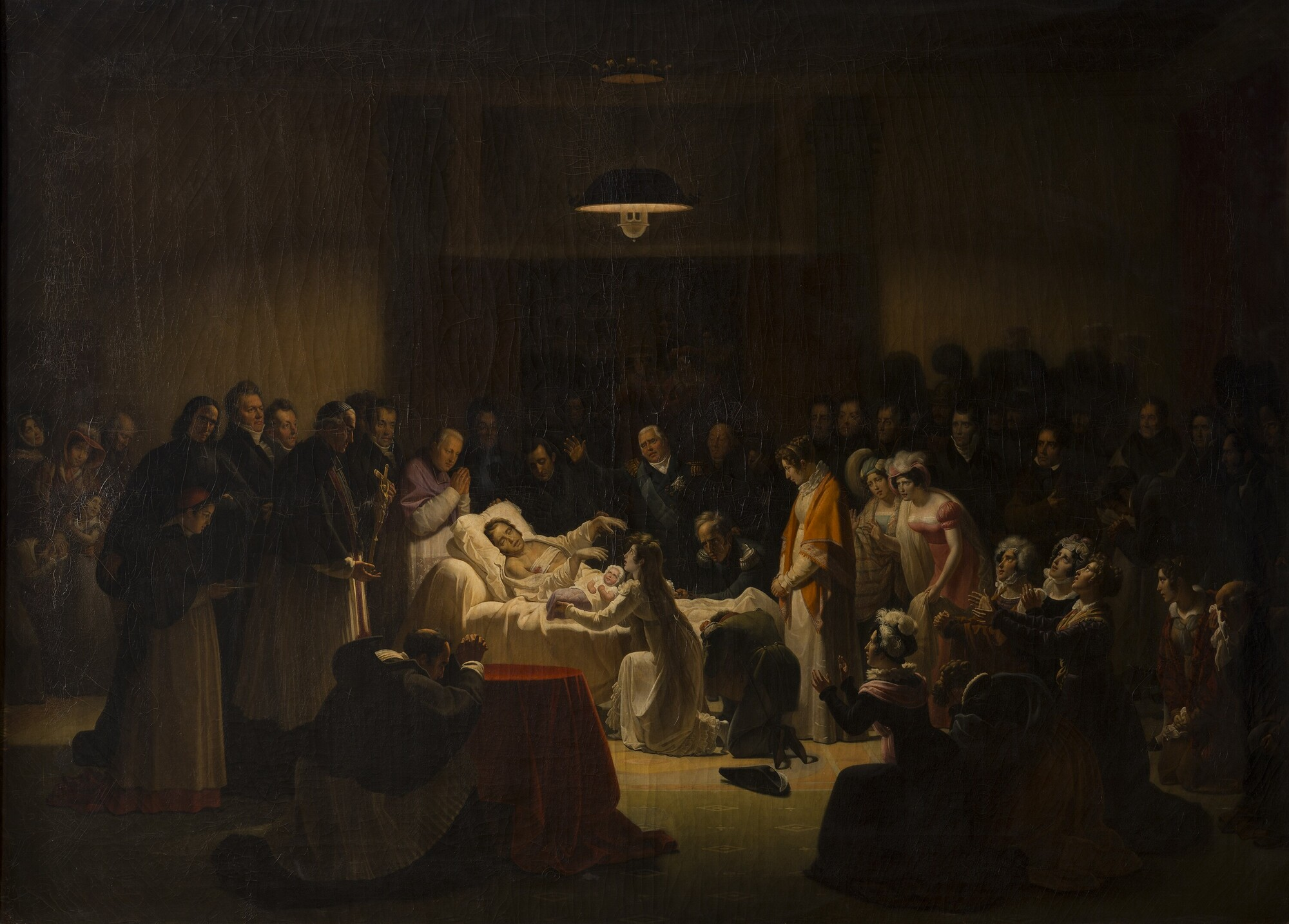
The Death of the Duke of Berry by Alexandre Menjaud. The assassination of the Duke of Berry in February 1820 led to Richelieu's return as Prime Minister.

Richelieu returned to France in 1814. On the return of Napoleon from Elba, he accompanied Louis XVIII as far as Lille. From there, he chose to return to Vienna in order to rejoin the Russian army, believing that he could best serve the interests of the new king and of France by attaching himself to the headquarters of Tsar Alexander.

Richelieu's character and antecedents alike marked him out as a valuable support for the monarchy at the beginning of the Bourbon Restoration. Though the bulk of his confiscated estates were lost beyond recall, he did not share the angry resentment of most of the returning émigrés, from whose company and intrigues he had held himself aloof during his long Russian exile. More specifically, he did not share their delusions as to the possibility of undoing the work of the French Revolution. As the personal friend of the Russian emperor, his influence in the councils of the Allies had been of great service. Despite this fact, however, he refused the offer of a place in the ministry of the former revolutionary and Bonapartist Talleyrand, pleading both a long absence from France and an ignorance of its conditions. Eventually, though, after Talleyrand's resignation in advance of the opening session of the new Ultraroyalist Chamber of Deputies (the famous Chambre introuvable), Richelieu decided (after much urging from Mathieu de Montmorency) to succeed Talleyrand as the Prime Minister of France, though – as he himself said – he did not know the face of a single one of his colleagues. On 26 September 1815 he was appointed President du Conseil (Prime Minister), a position he held until 29 December 1818, when he was succeeded by Jean Joseph Dessolles. During this tenure, he was also the Minister of Foreign Affairs.

It was mainly due to his efforts that France was so quickly relieved of the burden of the Allied army of occupation. In order to achieve this goal, he attended the Congress of Aix-la-Chapelle in 1818, where he was informed in confidence of an Allied pledge to interfere internally in France if a revival of revolutionary trouble was to occur. It was partly owing to this reassuring knowledge that he left office in December the same year, on the refusal of his colleagues to support a modification of the electoral law. After the murder of the king's nephew, the Duke of Berry, and the enforced retirement of Decazes, he was again called to the premiership (21 February 1820); but his position was untenable due to political attacks from the "Ultras" on one side and the Liberals on the other. On 12 December 1821, he again resigned.

He died, of a stroke, on 17 May 1822.

== Sources ==
- Chisholm, Hugh, ed. (1911). "Richelieu, Armand Emmanuel Sophie Septemanie du Plessis, Duc de" . Encyclopædia Britannica. Vol. 23 (11th ed.). Cambridge University Press. pp. 302–303.
- Cynthia Cox, Talleyrand's Successor, London (1959) Amazon.com
- Antonia Fraser, Marie Antoinette, The Journey, New York (2001) Amazon.com
- A great part of Richelieu's correspondence with Pozzo di Borgo, Capo d'Istria and others, with his journal of his travels in Germany and the Turkish campaign, and a notice by the duchesse de Richelieu, is published by the Imperial Russian Historical Society, vol. 54.
- There is an exhaustive study of his career by Léon de Crousaz-Crétet, Le Duc de Richelieu en Russie et en France (1897), with which compare the article Le duc de Richelieu et les premières années de la Restauration by L. Rioult de Neuville in the Revue des questions historiques (July 1897)
- See also R. de Cisternes, Le Duc de Richelieu, son action aux conférences d'Aix-la-Chapelle (1898), containing copies of documents.

French nobility
Preceded by Antoine de Vignerot du Plessis	Duke of Richelieu; 1791–1822	Succeeded by Armand François Odet Chapelle de Jumilhac
Preceded by Antoine de Vignerot du Plessis	Duke of Fronsac; 1791–1822	Extinct
Political offices
Preceded by Charles Maurice de Talleyrand	Prime Minister of France; 1815–1818	Succeeded by Jean-Joseph, Marquis Dessolles
Preceded by Élie, Count Decazes	Prime Minister of France; 1820–1821	Succeeded by Jean-Baptiste, Comte de Villèle
Government offices
Preceded by Platon Zubov as Governor-General of Yekaterinoslav, Voznesensk and Taurida	Governor-General of Yekaterinoslav, Kherson and Taurida; 1805 – 1814	Succeeded by Aleksandr Rudzevich as Military Governor of Kherson
Preceded by Pavel Pustoshkin	Governor of Odessa; 1803 – 1814	Succeeded by Thomas Cobley as acting mayor
