= De Brancas =

Coat of arms of de Brancas family

The De Brancas family is an old French aristocratic family of Neapolitan origin, stemmed from an Italian Brancaccio family. Members of the family occupied many important positions in the history of France and were awarded with the title of Duc de Brancas.

== Notable members ==
- André de Brancas (d.1595), Admiral of France
- Jean-Baptiste de Brancas (1693–1770), French bishop
- Louis, Marquis of Brancas and Prince of Nisaro, also known as "Louis-Henri de Brancas-Forcalquier" and "Louis de Brancas de Forcalquier de Céreste" (1672–1750), Marshal of France
- Henri-Ignace de Brancas, Bishop of Lisieux 1714–1760, brother of the above Louis
- Louis-Léon de Brancas (1733–1824), 3rd duc de Lauraguais, 6th duc de Villars, French author
- Nicola de Brancas, Bishop of Marseille 1445–1466
- Marie Françoise de Brancas (d.1715), wife of Alphonse Henri, Count of Harcourt, rebuilt the Château d'Harcourt
- Duc de Brancas, any of a number of hereditary office-holders under the Ancien Régime of France
