= Duke of Fronsac =

French noble title, 17th to 19th centuries

Dukedom of Fronsac
- Arms of the Vignerot du Plessis family
- Creation date: 1634 (second creation)
- First holder: Armand Jean du Plessis de Richelieu
- Last holder: Armand Emmanuel de Vignerot du Plessis
- Extinction date: 1822

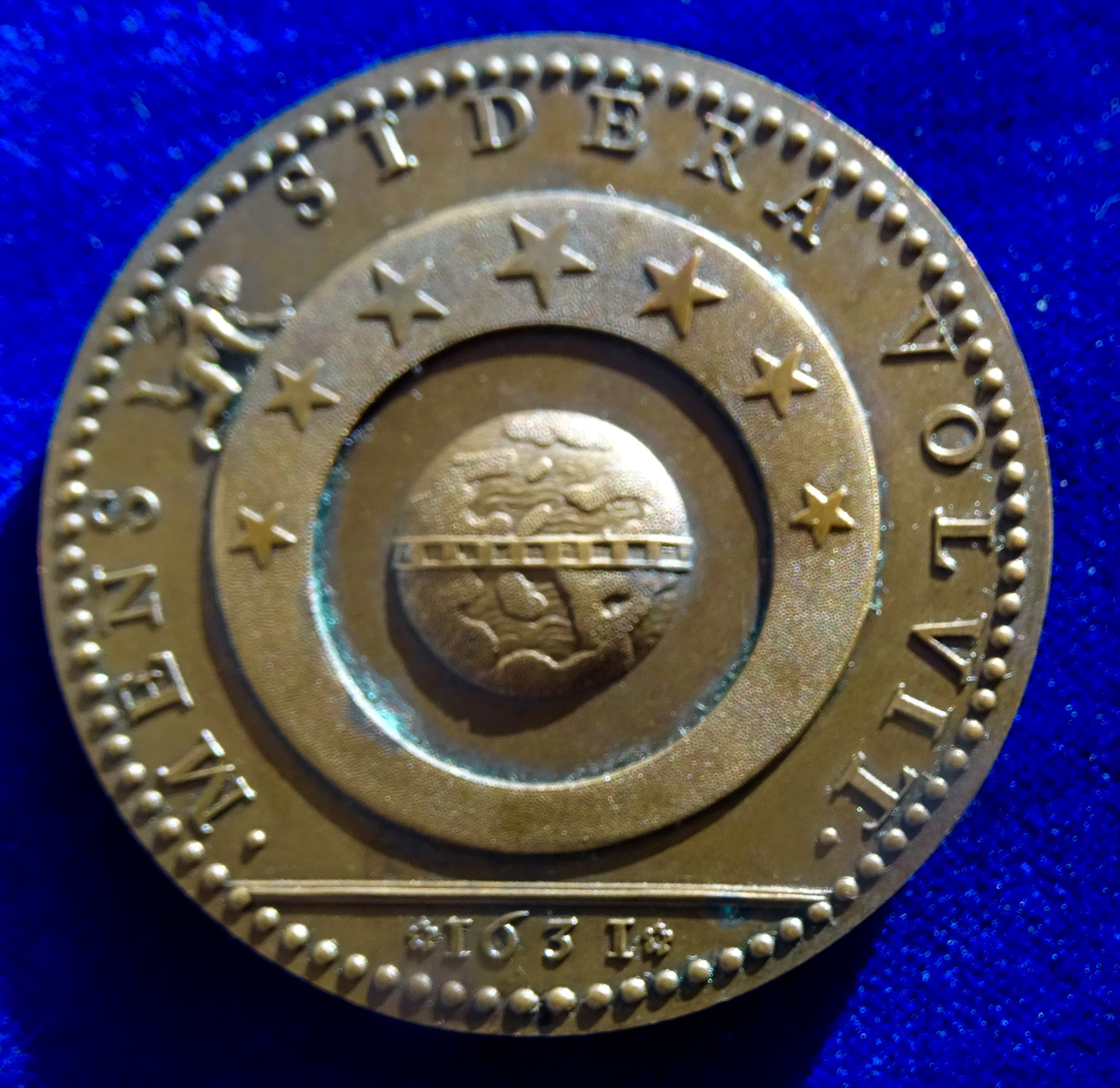
Medallion d. = 54 mm. Later strike. Armand Jean du Plessis, Cardinal-Duke of Richelieu and of Fronsac, 1585 Paris – 1642 Paris. Portrait r., curved above: "· ARMANVS IOAN · CARD · DE RICHELIEV ·"/ 7 stars above globe, curved above: "· MENS SIDERA VOLVIT ·", date in exergue. Edge lettering: "BRONZE". Forrer VI, p. 369. Medallist: I. (Jean) Warin, 1604 Liège – 1672 Paris. Condition: Nice EXTREMELY FINE+, little tarnish.

Duke of Fronsac (French: duc de Fronsac) was a title of French nobility, first created by promoting the seigneurie of Fronsac to a duchy in 1608, but the title became extinct a few decades later. This title was revived in 1634 for Armand Jean du Plessis de Richelieu, better known as Cardinal Richelieu, and it survived until the 19th century.

== First creation ==
The title of duc de Fronsac was first created in 1608 for the House of Longueville, a bastard-cadet branch of the House of Valois. The mother of the first duke, Anne de Caumont (1574–1642), held the lesser title of marquis de Fronsac when her son Léonor II d'Orléans was created a duke. The title became extinct after the first duke died without an heir and the title passed to his father, who had no other issue.

- In 1608, Léonor II d'Orléans (1605–1622) was created 1st Duke of Fronsac and held the title until his death in January 1622. Having no heir, the title was passed to his father.
- Beginning in 1622, the title was in the possession of the first duke's father, François III d'Orléans (1570–1631), 2nd Duke of Fronsac, Duke of Château-Thierry and Count of Saint-Pol. Having no other heirs after his only son preceded him in death, the title became extinct when François III died in 1631.

== Second creation ==
In 1634, the title of duc de Fronsac was revived for Armand Jean du Plessis de Richelieu, who already held the title of Duke of Richelieu. The title of Duke of Fronsac was often used by subsequent Dukes of Richelieu as a titre d'attente, or courtesy title, for the heir to the Dukedom of Richelieu.

- From 1634 to 1642, the title was held by Armand Jean du Plessis de Richelieu (1585–1642), 1st Duke of Richelieu.
- From 1642 to 1646, the title was held by the cardinal-duc's nephew, Jean Armand de Maillé-Brézé (1613–1646), Marquis de Brézé.
- The title was held from 1646 to 1674 by the former's sister, Claire Clémence de Maillé (1628–1694), Princess of Condé, who ceded the title in 1674 to her cousin (see below).
- From 1674 to 1715, the title was held by Armand Jean de Vignerot du Plessis (1629–1715), 2nd Duke of Richelieu.
- From 1715 to 1788, the title was held by Louis François Armand de Vignerot du Plessis (1696–1788), 3rd Duke of Richelieu. He was known from birth as the duc de Fronsac as a courtesy title.
- From 1788 to 1791, the title was held by Louis Antoine Sophie de Vignerot du Plessis (1736–1791), 4th Duke of Richelieu. He was known as the duc de Fronsac when his father held the more senior title of duc de Richelieu.
- From 1791 to 1822, the title was held by Armand Emmanuel de Vignerot du Plessis (1766–1822), 5th Duke of Richelieu and Prime Minister of France from 1815 to 1818 and 1820 to 1821. He was known from birth by the courtesy title of comte de Chinon, since the title of duc de Fronsac was being used as a courtesy title by his father until the death of the 3rd Duke of Richelieu in 1788. At that point, his father inherited the more senior title of duc de Richelieu, and Armand Emmanuel in turn used the courtesy title of duc de Fronsac. The title became extinct upon his death in 1822.
