= Arboretum d'Harcourt =

Historic arboretum in Normandy, France

Coordinates: 49.173°N 0.788°E

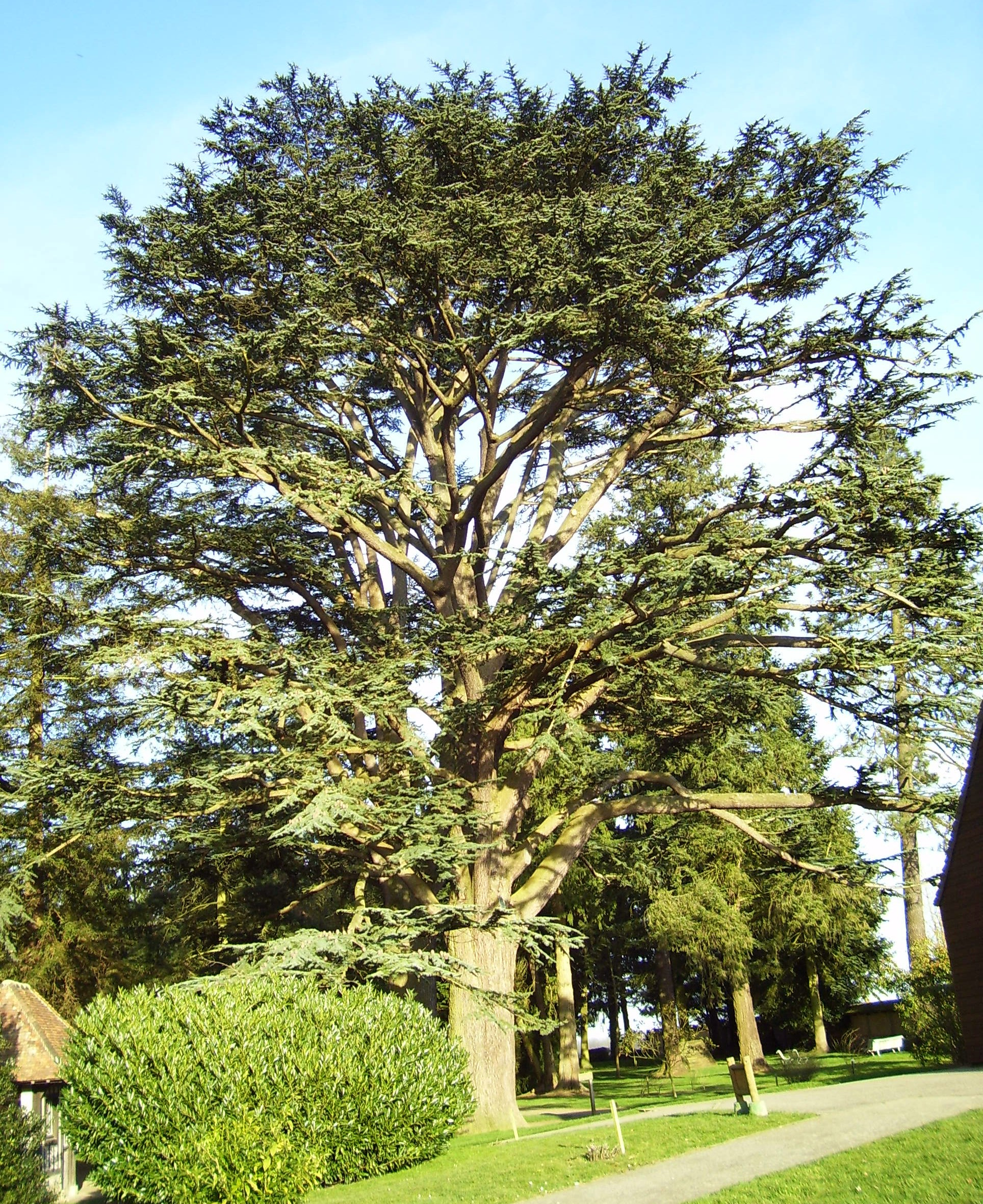
Lebanon cedar at the entrance of the arboretum at the castle of Harcourt in the département Eure in France.

The Arboretum d'Harcourt (11 hectares) is a historic arboretum located on the grounds of the 14th-century Château d'Harcourt in Harcourt, Eure, Normandy, France.

The arboretum is one of the oldest in France, dating to 1802 when Louis-Gervais Delamare acquired the castle and its grounds. He introduced pine cultivation on 200 hectares. After his death in 1827 the arboretum was bequeathed to the Société royale d'agriculture, which in 1833 charged botanist François André Michaux to establish the arboretum. In 1852 North American species were planted, followed from 1855 to 1860 by those of Europe and Asia. Since 1999 the arboretum has been the property of the Conseil Général du l'Eure, and today contains more than 3,000 woody plants representing about 470 species. The chateau's grounds also contain a 230-acre (0.93 km^{2}) forest of native and exotic species, with walking paths.

== See also ==
- Harcourt Arboretum, Oxford
- List of botanical gardens in France
