= Duc de Brancas =

Coat of arms of the Brancas family

The title duc de Brancas may refer to a number of hereditary office-holders under the Ancien Régime of France. The most famous holder of that title was a member of the social circle of Philippe II, Duke of Orléans, who served as Regent of France from 1715 to 1723. Brancas was known to be amusing, good-natured, and attracted to young men.

Despite his high title, Brancas was not wealthy, but he solidly refused to exploit his relationship with France's regent in return for financial gain. Such a lack of corruption was rare at the time, and put the family in strained circumstances. Brancas' heir, the Marquis d'Oise, would have to sign a marriage contract with a three-year-old girl from a wealthy background when the Marquis was himself thirty-three in order to support the Brancas family.

When Brancas reached the age that he had to pay young men to sleep with him, he decided to give up on secular life and retired to a monastery. The Regent was so distraught at losing his friend that he cried twice during their last supper together. Brancas died in 1739, at the age of seventy-six. Despite Brancas' rectitude in regard to his position, he formed part of a pleasure-loving circle around the Regent which alienated France's conservatives and undermined conservative support for the Regency.

== See also ==
- de Brancas
