= Château d'Harcourt =

Castle in the Eure department of France

Coordinates: 49°10′26″N 0°47′11″E

The Château d'Harcourt, situated in the commune of Harcourt in the Eure department of France, is the cradle of the Harcourt family. The castle is one of the best preserved castles in the country and contains the oldest arboretum in France.

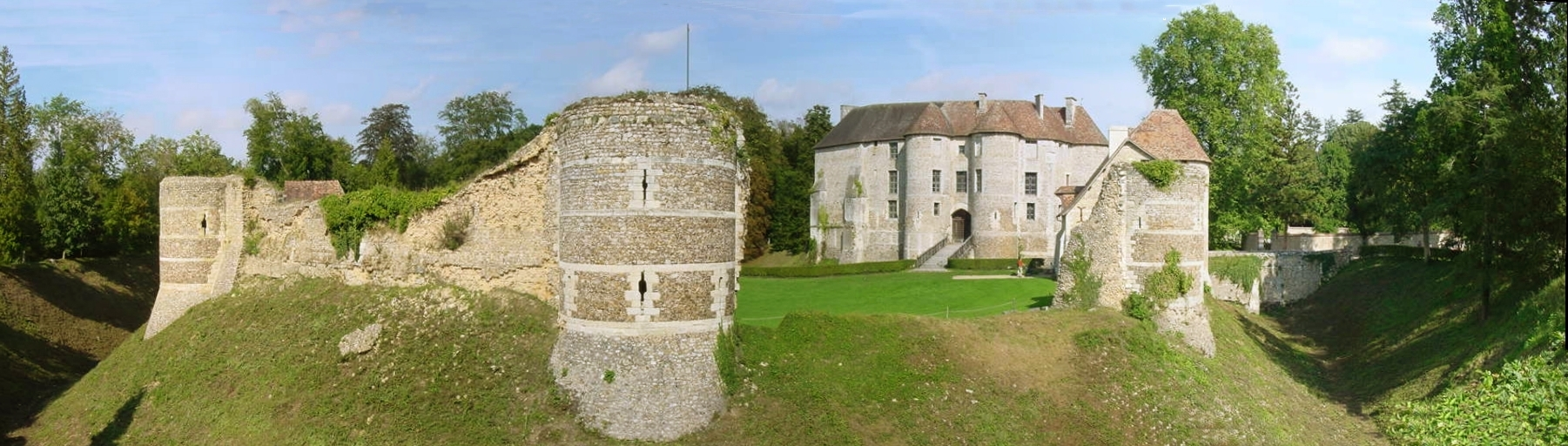
Panoramic view of the Château d'Harcourt

== History ==
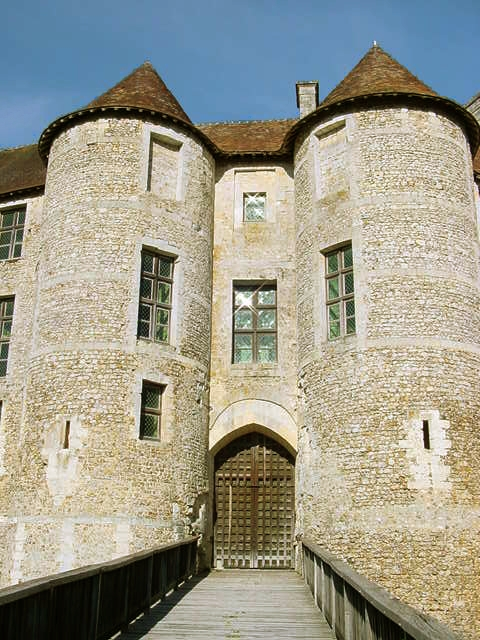
The entrance to the residential area of the Château

Although the lords of Harcourt trace their origins to the year 1000, it is only in the second half of the 12th century that the existence of a castle can be proven from historical texts. Robert II d'Harcourt was a companion in the crusade of Richard Lionheart; the first stone castle was certainly built by him. Harcourts appear later among the most important barons of Normandy. Jean II d'Harcourt, for example, was named Marshal of France (French: maréchal de France) and accommodated in his residence King Philip III. In 1338, King Philip VI, set up the seigniory of Harcourt, with the Château d'Harcourt forming its principal town.

The fortress appears to have seldom been under siege through history. It is only at the time of the Hundred Years' War that Harcourt became a military base. In 1418, the castle was claimed by the English, but they were eventually expelled by the counts of Dunois, Eu and Saint-Pol in 1449. As the war came to a close, the domain returned to the Rieux family, then, starting from the second half of the 16th century, to the powerful Lorraine-Guise family. The French Wars of Religion caused an increase in defensive fortifications in the castle. In 1588, the members of a league occupied the castle. In the 17th century, the castle lost all military interest; it was then partially abandoned and invaded by vegetation after Louis Gervais Delamarre acquired it in 1802. With his death, Harcourt was bestowed to the Royal Academy of Agriculture of France (French: L'académie royale d'Agriculture). Today, the council general of Eure is the owner.

== Architecture ==
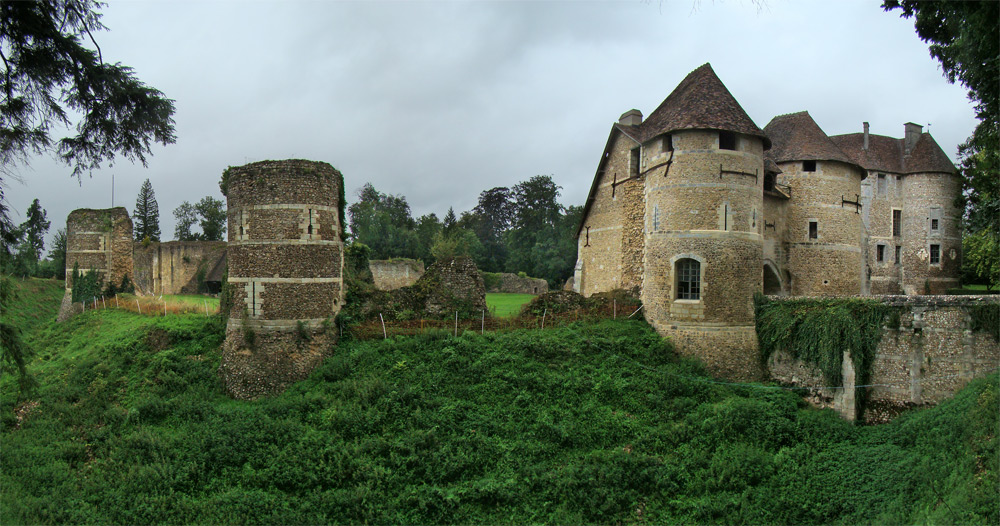

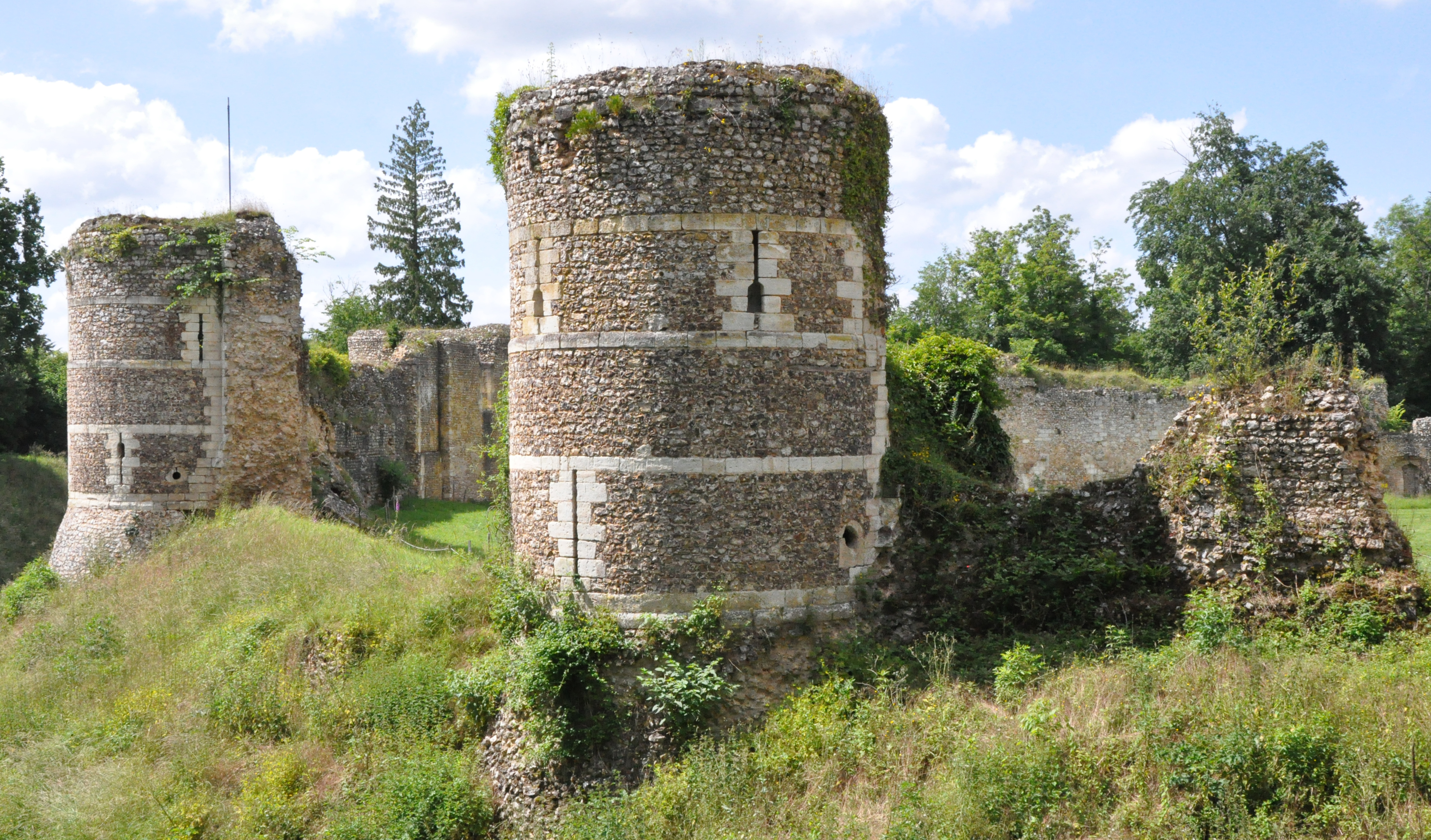
Old keeps

It is thought that the Château d'Harcourt consisted of the beginning of a motte-and-bailey surrounded by a ditch, like many of the other fortresses of the time. In the 12th century, a square stone tower took the place of earlier wooden constructions. The castellan architecture then evolved according to the progression of sieges, and the rise of its successive owners. In the 13th century, the old keep was integrated in a polygonal castle. The bailey was protected by a curtain wall punctuated by nine round towers. Ahead of the curtain wall, a deep ditch, dry most of the time (lacking a river to feed it), girdled the structure.

Through the 14th century, the defence of the castle continued to improve. A monumental fortified gate, a châtelet, was installed to defend the more exposed of the two entries. The archeries were enlarged to allow firing crossbows.

In the 17th century, Marie Françoise de Brancas (d.1715), wife of Alphonse Henri, Count of Harcourt, undertook to refit the medieval fortress to make it more hospitable. A friend of Madame de Maintenon, she demolished three sides of the polygonal castle and thus opened her apartments to the light. With a similar aim, large rectangular bays were bored and the interior disposition was re-examined.

The medieval Château d'Harcourt appears truncated today, especially as the top of the keep was levelled to bring it to the same height as the other buildings. There is no longer any building in the bailey, though a chapel was probably there formerly.

The castle is listed as a monument historique by the French Ministry of Culture.

== See also ==
- Arboretum d'Harcourt
- List of castles in France
