= Louis François Armand de Vignerot du Plessis, 3rd Duke of Richelieu =

French soldier and statesman, Marshall of France (1696–1788)

Armand de Vignerot du Plessis
- 3rd Duke of Richelieu
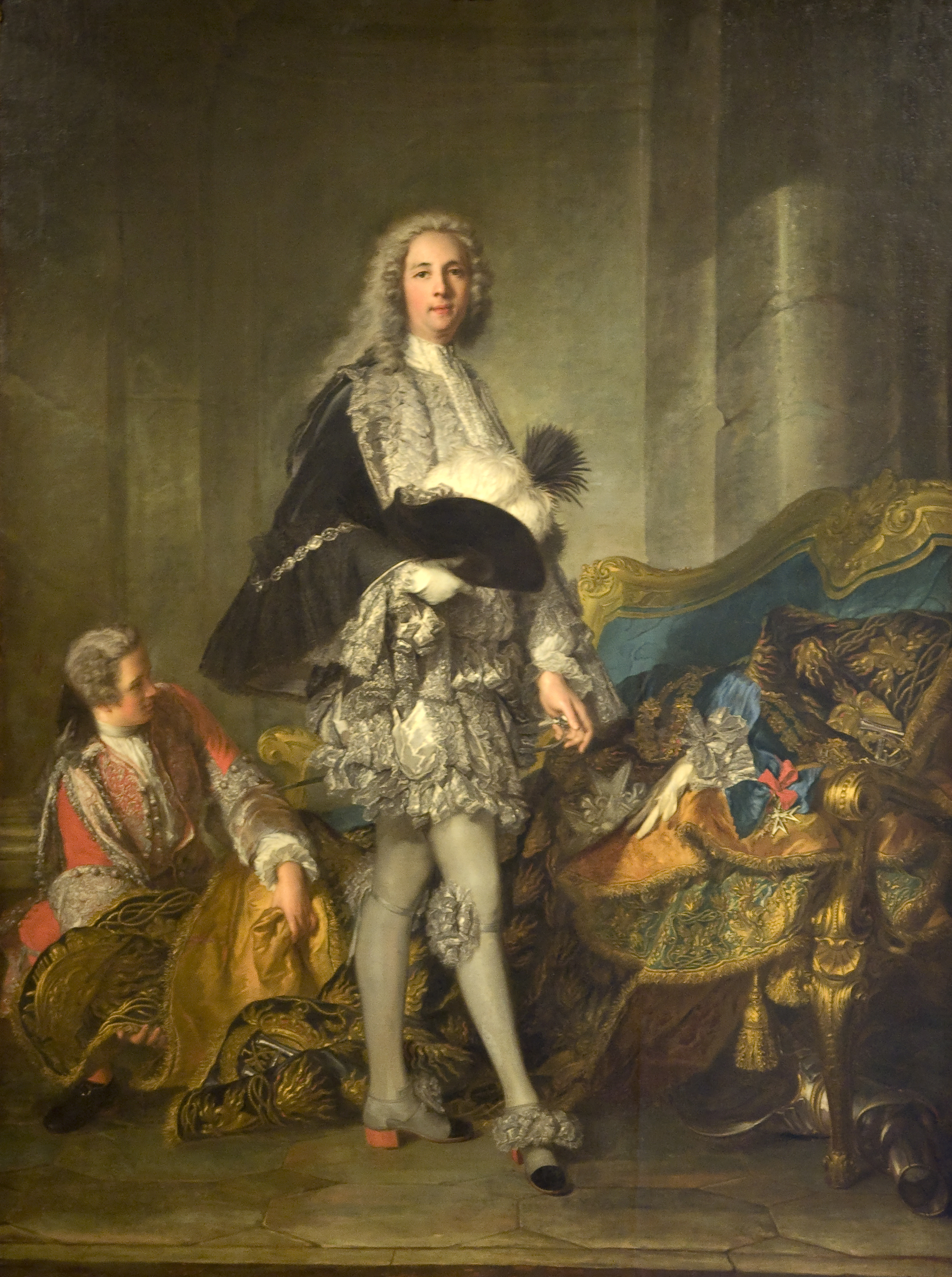
- Portrait by Jean-Marc Nattier, 1732
- Full name: Louis François Armand de Vignerot du Plessis
- Born: 13 March 1696; Paris, France
- Died: 8 August 1788 (aged 92); Paris, France
- Spouses: Anne Catherine de Noailles; Élisabeth Sophie of Lorraine; Jeanne Catherine Josèphe de Lavaulx
- Issue Detail: Antoine, Duke of Richelieu; Jeanne Sophie, Countess of Egmont
- Father: Armand Jean de Vignerot du Plessis
- Mother: Anne Marguerite d'Acigné

Louis François Armand de Vignerot du Plessis, 3rd Duke of Richelieu (French: [lwi fʁɑ̃swa aʁmɑ̃ də viɲʁo dy plɛsi]; 13 March 1696 – 8 August 1788), was a French soldier, diplomat and statesman. He joined the army and participated in three major wars. He eventually rose to the rank of Marshal of France.

He was the son of Armand Jean de Vignerot du Plessis, duc de Richelieu, who in turn was the great-nephew of Cardinal Richelieu, the prominent French statesman who had dominated France in the early 17th century.

== Early years ==
Louis François Armand de Vignerot du Plessis was born in Paris, and Louis XIV was his godfather. In his early days, he was thrice imprisoned in the Bastille: in 1711 at the instance of his stepfather, in 1716 in consequence of a duel, and in 1719 for his share in the Cellamare Conspiracy of Giulio Alberoni against Philippe II, Duke of Orléans, the regent for Louis XV.

Apart from his reputation as a man of exceptionally loose morals, he attained, in spite of a limited education, distinction as a diplomat and general. He was the French ambassador to the court of the Holy Roman Emperor, Charles VI, in Vienna from 1725 to 1729.

== Military career ==
In 1733–1734, he served in a Rhine campaign during the War of the Polish Succession. The following decade during the War of the Austrian Succession he fought with distinction at Dettingen and Fontenoy, where he directed the grapeshot upon the British columns, and three years afterwards he made a brilliant defence of Genoa.

=== Seven Years War ===
==== Siege of Menorca ====
In 1756 during the Siege of Menorca he expelled the British from Menorca by the capture of the stronghold of San Felipe. On his return to France he was hailed by Madame de Pompadour who told him "your star has risen and it shall never be dimmed".

While waiting for suitable employment, the Duc took command of the French forces on the southern coast around Toulon. In 1757 following Frederick the Great's sudden invasion of Bohemia, he was given command of a relief force that was to relieve the Siege of Prague. However this was cancelled when an Austrian army defeated Frederick at Kolin forcing him to break off the siege and withdraw from Bohemia.

==== Invasion of Hanover ====
The French ministers were deeply unhappy with d'Estrees the commander of the Army of Westphalia which had orders to invade Hanover but was moving extremely slowly. It was decided to replace him with Richelieu. Arriving shortly after the victorious Battle of Hastenbeck, with the Anglo-German Army of Observation retreating rapidly from him, the Duc lead his army in pursuit.

His army now occupied most of Hanover, capturing the capital in the autumn. His orders were to smash the Army of Observation and occupy all of Hanover, before turning east and launching an attack on the Prussian fortress of Magdeburg. Instead Richelieu, fearing that his army was not in a condition to face battle, concluded the Convention of Klosterzeven which allowed the enemy to escape destruction. He was heavily criticised for this in Paris, where the terms were considered far too lenient.

The Duc then led his army into winter quarters at Halberstadt postponing the attack on Magdeburg. Early in the new year he suddenly resigned his command, and retired to France - handing over to Louis, Count of Clermont. He was widely accused of corruption during his six months as commander in Hanover. He and his officers were suspected of having stolen three-quarters of the money he was supposed to raise in taxes from the occupied territories, as well as stealing the pay of his soldiers.

His pillaging campaigns in Hanover procured him the sobriquet of the petit père de la maraude.

== Political career and intrigue ==
His real public career began ten years after his service in the Rhine campaign. After the wars, he plunged again into court intrigue. Initially, he was the best friend of King Louis XV, whom he had known since the King was a child. The relationship later cooled a little, however, when he opposed Louis's mistress, Madame de Pompadour.

After Pompadour's death in 1764, his position in court was restored and he developed an amiable friendship with the King's last mistress, Madame du Barry. However, he was again not welcome at court when Louis' grandson, Louis XVI, succeeded to the throne in 1774. This was because the new Queen, Marie Antoinette, disliked both Madame du Barry and Richelieu's nephew, the overly ambitious Duke of Aiguillon.

== Private life ==
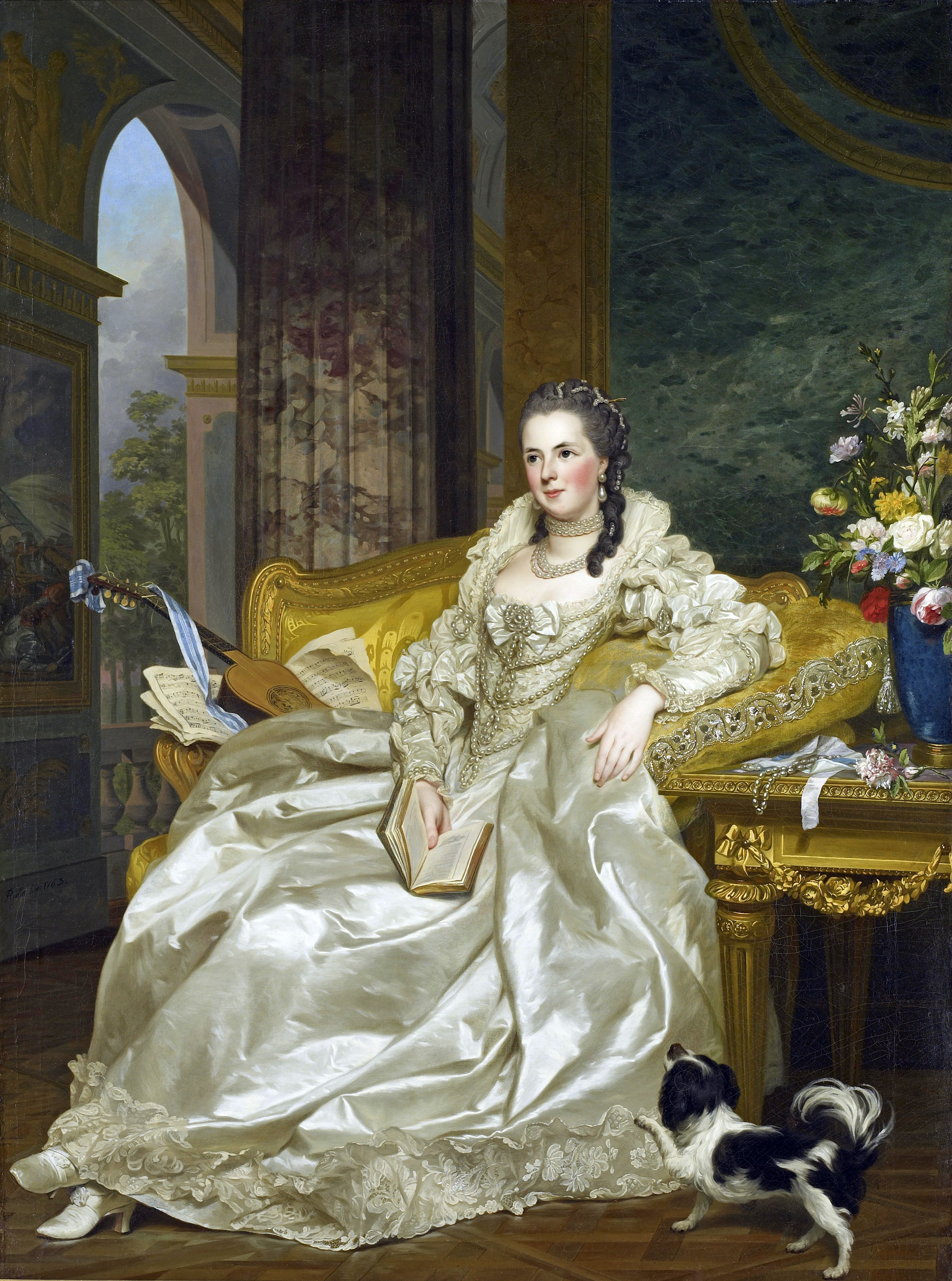
His daughter the Countess of Egmont by Roslin.

The duke was such a renowned womanizer that it is said Choderlos de Laclos based the character Valmont in Les Liaisons dangereuses on him.

He was married three times. At the age of fourteen, against his will, he was forced to marry Anne Catherine de Noailles. In 1734, as a result of the intrigues of Voltaire, he married Élisabeth Sophie of Lorraine, the daughter of Anne Marie Joseph, Count of Harcourt. She became the mother of his heir, Louis Antoine Sophie de Vignerot du Plessis. When he was eighty-four years old, he married as his third wife an Irish lady.

In 1721, Mme de Polignac and the Marquise de Nesle fought a famous duel over him. In 1729, he began an affair with Émilie du Châtelet, and although it ended, they continued to be frequent correspondents for over a decade.

He was also the lover of the famous courtesan and novelist Claudine Guérin de Tencin, and of Marie Louise Élisabeth d'Orléans, Duchess of Berry, elder daughter of Philippe II, Duke of Orléans, a very ambitious and powerful young widow who was infamous at the time for her alleged large sexual appetite. He then had an affair with Berry's younger sister Charlotte Aglaé d'Orléans, and with her first cousin Louise Anne de Bourbon. Another mistress was Marie Sophie de Courcillon, wife of Charles François d'Albert d'Ailly, Duke of Picquigny and later of Hercule Mériadec de Rohan, Duke of Rohan-Rohan.

== Children ==
1. Louis Antoine Sophie de Vignerot du Plessis (4 February 1736 – 1791), married Adélaide Gabrielle de Hautefort in 1765 and had issue; married Marie Antoinette de Gallifet and had issue;
2. Jeanne Sophie Elisabeth Septimanie de Vignerot du Plessis (1 March 1740 – 14 October 1773), married Don Casimir Pignatelli, Count of Egmont, Duke of Bisaccia; no issue.

== Sources ==
- Marshal de Richelieu's Mémoires, published by JL Soulavie in nine volumes (1790), are partially spurious.
- Williams, H. Noel, The Fascinating Duc de Richelieu (1910). Copy at HathiTrust.
- Cole, Hubert, First Gentleman of the Bedchamber: The Life of Louis-François-Armand, Maréchal Duc de Richelieu, Heinemann (1965).
- Herbermann, Charles, ed. (1912). "Armand-Jean du Plessis, Duke de Richelieu" . Catholic Encyclopedia. Vol. 13. New York: Robert Appleton Company.

French nobility
Preceded by Armand Jean de Vignerot du Plessis	Duke of Richelieu; 1715–1788	Succeeded by Antoine de Vignerot du Plessis
Preceded by Armand Jean de Vignerot du Plessis	Duke of Fronsac; 1715–1788	Succeeded by Antoine de Vignerot du Plessis
