= Joseph, Count of Harcourt =

Joseph
- Count of Harcourt
- Coat-of-arms of Harcourt
- Born: 30 April 1679; France
- Died: 29 April 1739 (aged 59); France
- Spouse: Marie Louise Jeannin de Castille
- Issue Detail: Louise Henriette Françoise, Duchess of Bouillon; Marie Élisabeth, Duchess of Richelieu; Louis, Prince of Harcourt
Names
- Anne Marie Joseph de Lorraine
- House: Lorraine
- Father: Alphonse Henri, Count of Harcourt
- Mother: Marie Françoise de Brancas

Joseph de Lorraine (Anne Marie Joseph; 30 April 1679 – 29 April 1739) was a member of an ancient House of Lorraine and Count of Harcourt. He was styled Prince de Guise before becoming Count of Harcourt.

== Early life ==
By birth, member of the junior branch of an old and influential noble family, he was born as the eldest son Alphonse Henri, Count of Harcourt and his wife, Marie Françoise de Brancas, member of an equally old House of Brancas.

== Marriage and issue ==
On 2 July 1705, he married Marie Louise Chrétienne Jeannin de Castille (d. 1735), daughter of Gaspard Jeannin de Castille. The couple had four children, three of which survived infancy and two had further issue:

- Louise Henriette Françoise de Lorraine (1707 – 31 March 1737) married Emmanuel Théodose de La Tour d'Auvergne and had issue;
- Marie Élisabeth Sofie de Lorraine (1710 – 2 August 1740) married Louis François Armand de Vignerot du Plessis and had issue;
- Louis de Lorraine (17 December 1720 – 20 June 1747) never married; styled Prince of Harcourt but de facto Count of Harcourt
- X de Lorraine (male) (January – May 1721) died unbaptised.

His female line descendants are the Dukes of Noailles through his eldest grand child Marie Charlotte de La Tour d'Auvergne, Princesse de Beauvau, wife of Charles Juste de Beauvau.

== Death ==
He died on 29 April 1739, aged 59.

== Sources ==
- Georges Poull, La maison ducale de Lorraine, 1991
