= Brancaccio family =

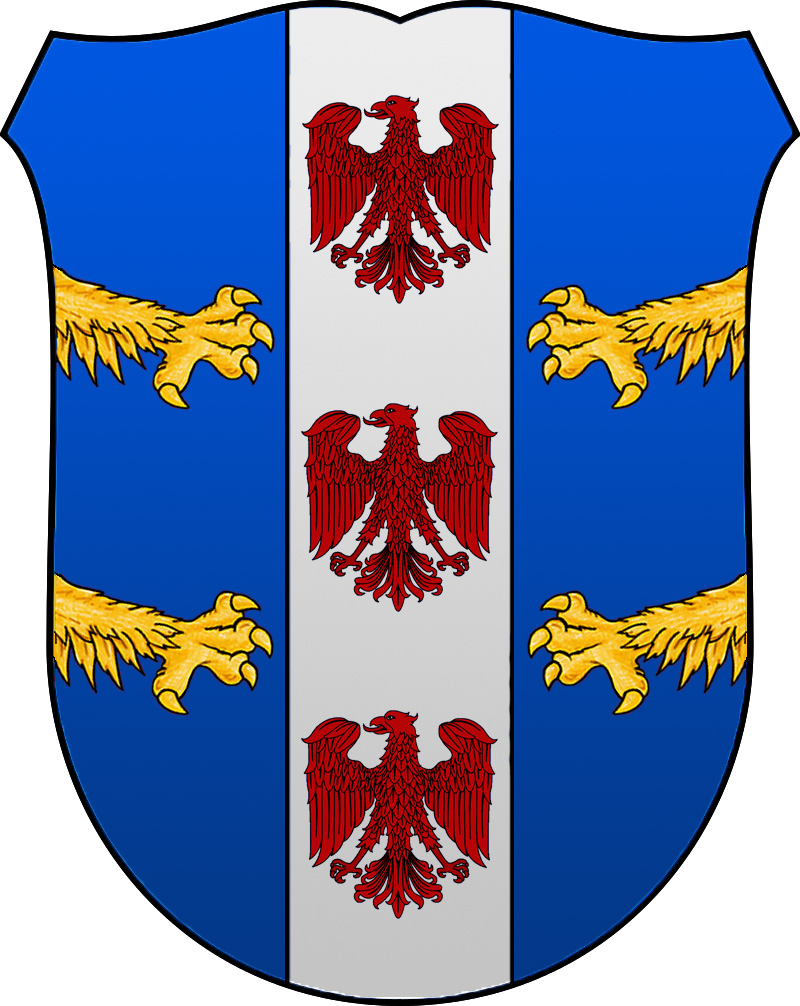
Coat of arms of the Brancaccio family

The Brancaccio family is the name of an old Italian noble family of Neapolitan origin, whose members occupied many important ecclesiastical positions in the Hierarchy of the Catholic Church.

== Notable members ==
- Antonio Brancaccio (died 1518), Bishop of Gravina di Puglia (1508–1518)
- David Brancaccio (born 1960), American journalist
- Francesco Maria Brancaccio (died 1675), Cardinal
- Giovanni Brancaccio (1903–1975), Italian painter
- Giulio Cesare Brancaccio (1515–1586), courtier, cavalier, actor, writer and singer
- Landolfo Brancaccio (died 1311), Cardinal
- Niccolò Brancaccio (died 1412), Cardinal
- Nuria Brancaccio (born 2000), Italian tennis player
- Ralph Brancaccio, American-European conceptual artist
- Raúl Brancaccio (born 1997), Italian tennis player, brother of Nuria
- Rinaldo Brancaccio (died 1427), Cardinal
- Stefano Brancaccio (died 1682), Cardinal
- Tommaso Brancaccio (1621–1677), Bishop of Nardo, and former bishop of Avellino
