= Harcourt, Eure =

Harcourt
- Commune
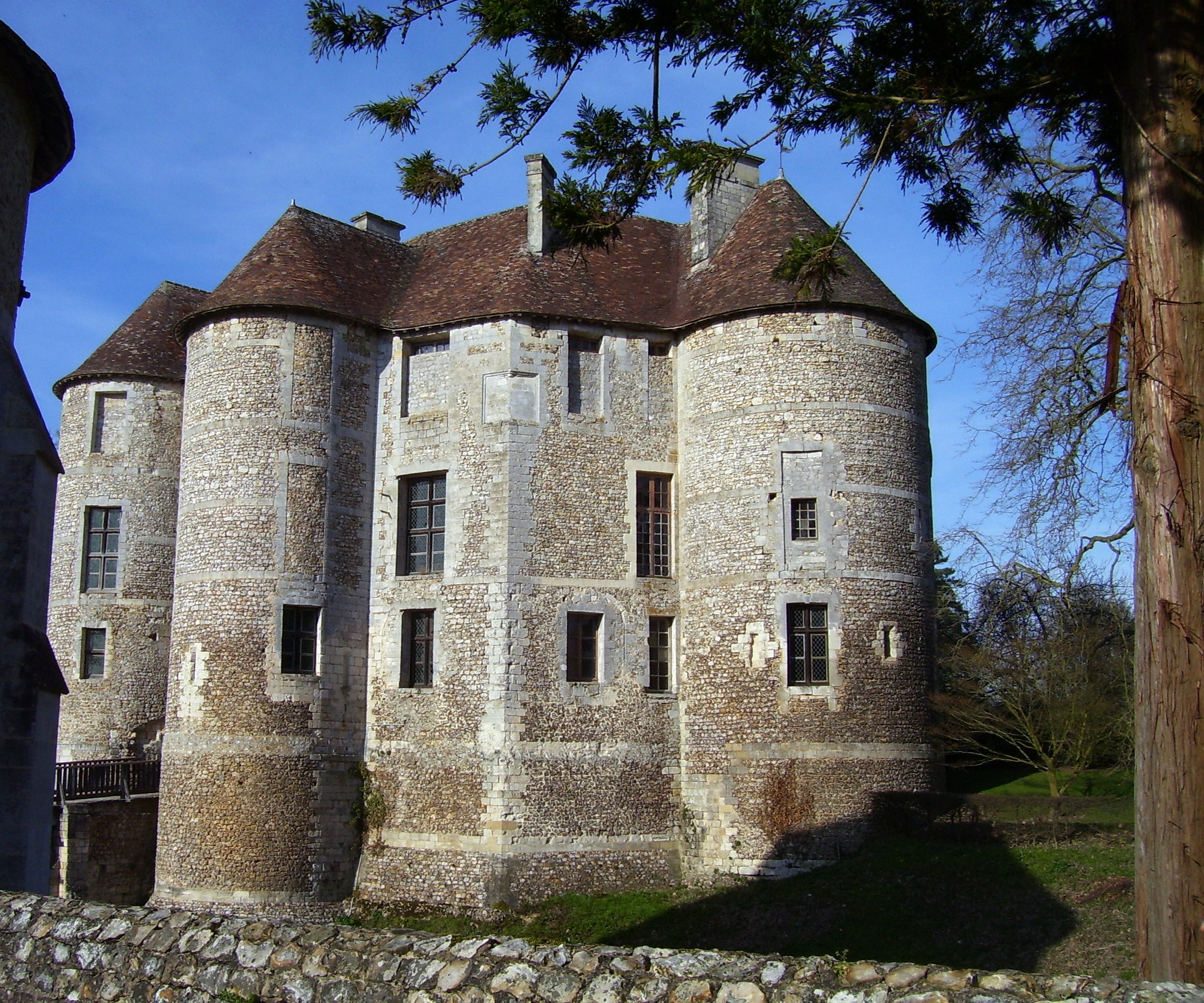
- Chateau

- Coat of arms
- Location of Harcourt
- Location within France Location within Normandy
- Coordinates: 49°10′04″N 0°47′14″E
- Country: France
- Region: Normandy
- Department: Eure
- Arrondissement: Bernay
- Canton: Brionne

Government
  - Mayor (2020–2026): Bernard Aubry
- Area^{1}: 15.2 km^{2} (5.9 sq mi)
- Elevation: 140 m (460 ft)
- Highest elevation: 147 m (482 ft)
- Lowest elevation: 81 m (266 ft)
- Population (2023): 1,062
  - Density: 69.9/km^{2} (181/sq mi)
- Time zone: UTC+01:00 (CET)
  - Summer (DST): UTC+02:00 (CEST)
- INSEE/Postal code: 27311 /27800
- ^{1} French Land Register data, which excludes lakes, ponds, glaciers > 1 km^{2} (0.386 sq mi or 247 acres) and river estuaries.

Harcourt (French pronunciation: [aʁkuʁ]) is a commune in the Eure department in the Normandy region in northern France.

== Population ==
Historical population
Year	Pop.	±% p.a.
1968	933	—
1975	935	+0.03%
1982	934	−0.02%
1990	957	+0.30%
1999	909	−0.57%
2007	907	−0.03%
2012	977	+1.50%
2017	1,068	+1.80%
2023	1,062	−0.09%
Source: INSEE

== Sights ==
- Château d'Harcourt - a medieval castle with the oldest arboretum in France: the Arboretum d'Harcourt

== See also ==
- Communes of the Eure department
