= Duke of Richelieu =

Title of French nobility

Dukedom of Richelieu
- Arms of the Vignerot du Plessis family
- Creation date: 26 November 1629
- First holder: Armand Jean du Plessis de Richelieu
- Last holder: Marie Odet Jean Armand Chapelle de Jumilhac
- Extinction date: 1952

Duke of Richelieu (French: duc de Richelieu) was a title of French nobility. It was created on 26 November 1629 for Armand Jean du Plessis de Richelieu (known as Cardinal Richelieu) who, as a Catholic clergyman, had no issue to pass it down to. It instead passed to his great-nephew, Armand Jean de Vignerot, grandson of his elder sister Françoise du Plessis (1577–1615), who had married René de Vignerot, Seigneur de Pontcourlay († 1625).

In 1751 they obtained the Imperial County of Rixingen, or Réchicourt-le-Château, between Alsace and Lorraine, and so they became a Sovereign House.

Armand Jean de Vignerot added the cardinal's surname of "du Plessis" to his own, adopted the cardinal's coat of arms and received the titles of Duke of Richelieu and Peer of France by letters patent in 1657.

Two new reversions of the title occurred in 1822 and 1879. The 5th Duke of Richelieu died without an heir, but he gained permission for the title of Duke of Richelieu to pass to the son of his half-sister Simplicie, wife of Antoine-Pierre Chapelle, Marquis de Jumilhac, with reversion to the descendants of his younger brother should he die without a male heir, thus effectively passing the title to his nephew.

The title became extinct in 1952 upon the death of the 8th Duke of Richelieu, Marie Odet Jean Armand Chapelle de Jumilhac, son of the 7th Duke of Richelieu and of Alice Heine (1858–1925). Alice was widowed in 1880 and remarried to Prince Albert I of Monaco in 1889.

== List of dukes of Richelieu ==
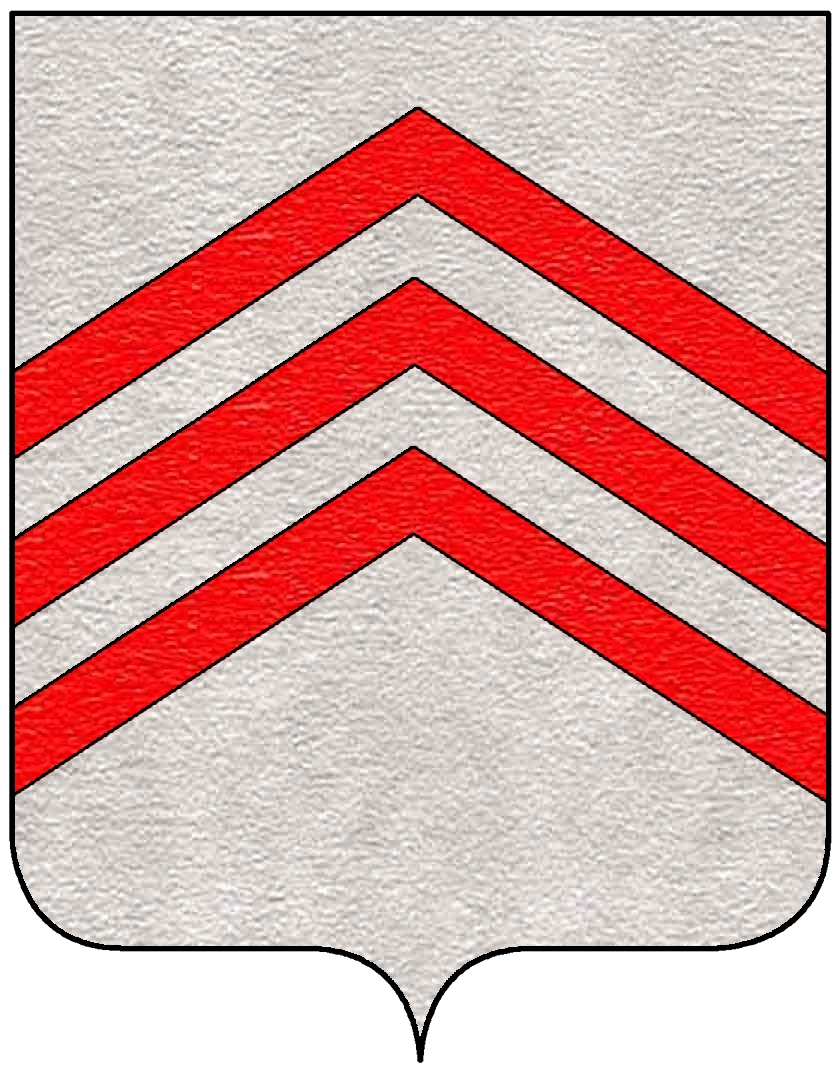
Arms of the dukes of the Chapelle de Jumilhac family

- Armand Jean du Plessis de Richelieu (1585–1642), cardinal, 1st Duke of Richelieu, first minister under Louis XIII.
- Armand Jean de Vignerot du Plessis, 2nd Duke of Richelieu (1629–1715), great-nephew of the cardinal.
- Louis François Armand de Vignerot du Plessis (1696–1788), 3rd Duke of Richelieu, marshal of France, son of the second Duke.
- Louis Antoine Sophie de Vignerot du Plessis (1736–1791), 4th Duke of Richelieu, son of the third Duke.
- Armand Emmanuel de Vignerot du Plessis (1766–1822), 5th Duke of Richelieu, président du Conseil and Foreign Minister, Governor-General of New Russia, son of the fourth Duke.
- Armand François Odet Chapelle de Jumilhac (1804–1879), 6th Duke of Richelieu, nephew of the fifth Duke.
- Marie Odet Richard Armand Chapelle de Jumilhac (1847–1880), 7th Duke of Richelieu, nephew of the sixth Duke.
- Marie Odet Jean Armand Chapelle de Jumilhac (1875–1952), 8th Duke of Richelieu, son of the seventh Duke.
