= François Louis, Count of Harcourt =

François Louis
- Count of Harcourt
- Coat-of-arms of Harcourt
- Born: 1623; Hôtel d'Elboeuf, Paris, Kingdom of France
- Died: 27 June 1694 (aged 70–71); Kingdom of France
- Spouse: Anne d'Ornano
- Issue Detail: Alphonse Henri, Count of Harcourt; Marie Angélique, Duchess of Cadaval
Names
- François Louis de Lorraine
- House: House of Lorraine-Guise
- Father: Charles II
- Mother: Catherine Henriette de Bourbon

François Louis de Lorraine (1623 – 27 June 1694) was a member of the House of Lorraine. He was Count of Harcourt. He was also the Count of Rieux, Rochefort and Montlaur. He was also Marquis of Maubec as well as the Baron of Aubenas.

== Biography ==
François Marie was born to Charles II, Duke of Elbeuf and his wife Catherine Henriette de Bourbon, Légitimée de France, legitimised daughter of Henry IV of France and Gabrielle d'Estrées. He was the couple's third son. In his youth, he was styled as the Prince of Harcourt, later being styled as Count.

A member of the House of Guise founded by Claude, Duke of Guise, he was a Prince of Lorraine as a male line descendant of René II, Duke of Lorraine. At court, he, like his Lorraine family, held the rank of Foreign Prince, a rank which was below that of the immediate Royal Family and Princes of the Blood.

His paternal first cousins included the Chevalier de Lorraine (lover of Philippe I, Duke of Orléans), Count of Armagnac; his maternal cousins included King Louis XIV and the above-mentioned Duke of Orléans.

He married Anne d'Ornano, comtesse de Montlaur and marquise de Maubec in her own right. The couple were married at the Palais-Royal, Paris in July 1645. Their eldest son, François, had been born before the marriage but he was recognised as legitimate in 1694. The couple had six children in all, two of which would have progeny. His eldest daughter Marie Angélique married the Portuguese Duke of Cadaval and died in childbirth. His other daughter Marie Anne was the Abbess of Montmartre from 1685 till her death. He was succeeded as Count of Harcourt by his second son, Alphonse Henri.

François Louis died in January 1694, aged 69 his wife outliving him by a year.

== Issue ==
1. François de Lorraine, Batard d'Harcourt (c.1645–c.1694) never married;
2. Marie Angélique Henriette de Lorraine (c.1646–10 June 1674) married Nuno Álvares Pereira de Melo, 1st Duke of Cadaval and had issue; died in childbirth;
3. Alphonse Henri Charles de Lorraine, Count of Harcourt (14 August 1648 – 19 October 1718) married Françoise de Brancas and had issue;
4. César de Lorraine, Prince then Count of Montlaur (c1650–31 July 1675) never married;
5. Marie Anne de Lorraine, Abbess in Montmartre (1657–2 October 1699) became abbess of Montmartre on 17 August 1685, never married;
6. Charles de Lorraine, Abbe d'Harcourt (1661–23 March 1683) never married.

== Ancestry ==
Ancestors of François Louis, Count of Harcourt

16. Claude de Lorraine, Duke of Guise
8. René de Lorraine, Marquis of Elbeuf
17. Antoinette de Bourbon
4. Charles de Lorraine, Duke of Elbeuf
18. Claude de Rieux, Count of Harcourt
9. Louise de Rieux
19. Suzanne de Bourbon-Montpensier
2. Charles de Lorraine, Duke of Elbeuf
20. Philippe Chabot, Count of Charny
10. Léonor Chabot, Count of Charny & of Buzançais
21. Françoise de Longwy, Lady of Mirebeau
5. Marguerite de Chabot
22. Joachim de Rye de Longwy, Lord of Rye
11. Françoise de Rye, Dame of Longvy & of Rye
23. Antoinette de Longvy, Lady of Neufchâtel
1. François Louis de Lorraine
24. Charles de Bourbon, Duke of Vendôme
12. Antoine de Bourbon, King of Navarre
25. Françoise d'Alençon
6. Henry IV of France
26. Henry II of Navarre
13. Jeanne III of Navarre
27. Marguerite de Valois
3. Catherine Henriette de Bourbon, Légitimée de France
28. Jean d'Estrées, Marquis of Coeuvres
14. Antoine d'Estrées, Marquis of Coeuvres
29. Catherine de Bourbon
7. Gabrielle d'Estrées
30. Jean Babou de La Bourdaisière, Count of Sagonne
15. Françoise Babou de La Bourdaisière
31. Françoise Robertet, Lady of Alluyes

== Sources ==
- Georges Poull, La maison ducale de Lorraine, 1991
