= Alphonse Henri, Count of Harcourt =

Alphonse Henri
- Count of Harcourt
- Coat-of-arms of Harcourt
- Born: 14 August 1648; France
- Died: 19 October 1718 (aged 70); France
- Spouse: Marie Françoise de Brancas
- Issue Detail: Anne Marie Joseph, Count of Harcourt; François Marie, Count of Maubec
- Alphonse Henri Charles de Lorraine
- House: Lorraine-Guise
- Father: François Louis, Count of Harcourt
- Mother: Anne d'Ornano

Alphonse Henri de Lorraine (Alphonse Henri Charles; 14 August 1648 – 19 October 1718) was a member of the House of Lorraine and Count of Harcourt.

== Early life ==
Born to François Louis, Count of Harcourt and his wife, Anne d'Ornano, Marquise de Maubec, Countess de Montlaur (d. 1695), he was the couple's third child. His older brother, François de Lorraine, Batard d'Harcourt, was illegitimate, having been born before his parents were married. As such, François was not entitled to inherit his father's land and titles. As such, at his father's death in 1694, Alphonshe became the Count of Harcourt having been styled as the Prince d'Harcourt.

== Marriage ==
At the age of eighteen, he married Marie Françoise de Brancas on 21 February 1667 in Paris. The couple had 9 children, of whom only 3 lived to adulthood. Françoise was the eldest of two daughters born to Count Charles de Brancas (1618-1681) and his wife, Susanne Garnier (1630-1685), widow of François de Brézé, Seigneur d’Isigny en Normandie. Her sister Marie married into the Brancas family.

== Issue ==
- Suzanne de Lorraine, Mademoiselle d'Harcourt (16 October 1668–January 1671) died in infancy;
- Anne Marie Joseph de Lorraine, Prince de Guise, Count of Harcourt (30 April 1679 – 29 April 1739) married Marie Louise Jeannin de Castille and had issue;
- François Marie de Lorraine, Count of Maubec (10 August 1686 – 1706) died in battle at Guastalla during the War of the Spanish Succession.
- François de Lorraine, Prince of Montlaur (1684-1705)
- Anne de Lorraine-Elbeuf (1668-1671)
- Marie de Lorraine-Elbeuf (1669-1671)
- Anne de Lorraine-Elbeuf (1670-1671)
- Anne Marguerite de Lorraine (b. 1675, died young)
- Charles de Lorraine (b. 1673, died young)

== Death ==
Alphonse Henri died at the age of 70 during the Regency of Philippe d'Orléans (Regent for the minority of Louis XV). His wife died in 1715.

== References and notes ==
- Georges Poull, La maison ducale de Lorraine, 1991
